= Roman Empire =

27 BC–476/1453 AD state and civilization

Roman Empire Imperium Romanum
- 27 BC – AD 395 (unified) (Note: Modern scholars often date the end of the "classical" or "unified" Roman Empire in AD 395. This is a modern convention, as the Empire continued to be seen as a single state even after the supposed "split" of 395, which was in fact one of many splits since 286.); AD 395 – 476/480 (Western); AD 395–1453 (Eastern)
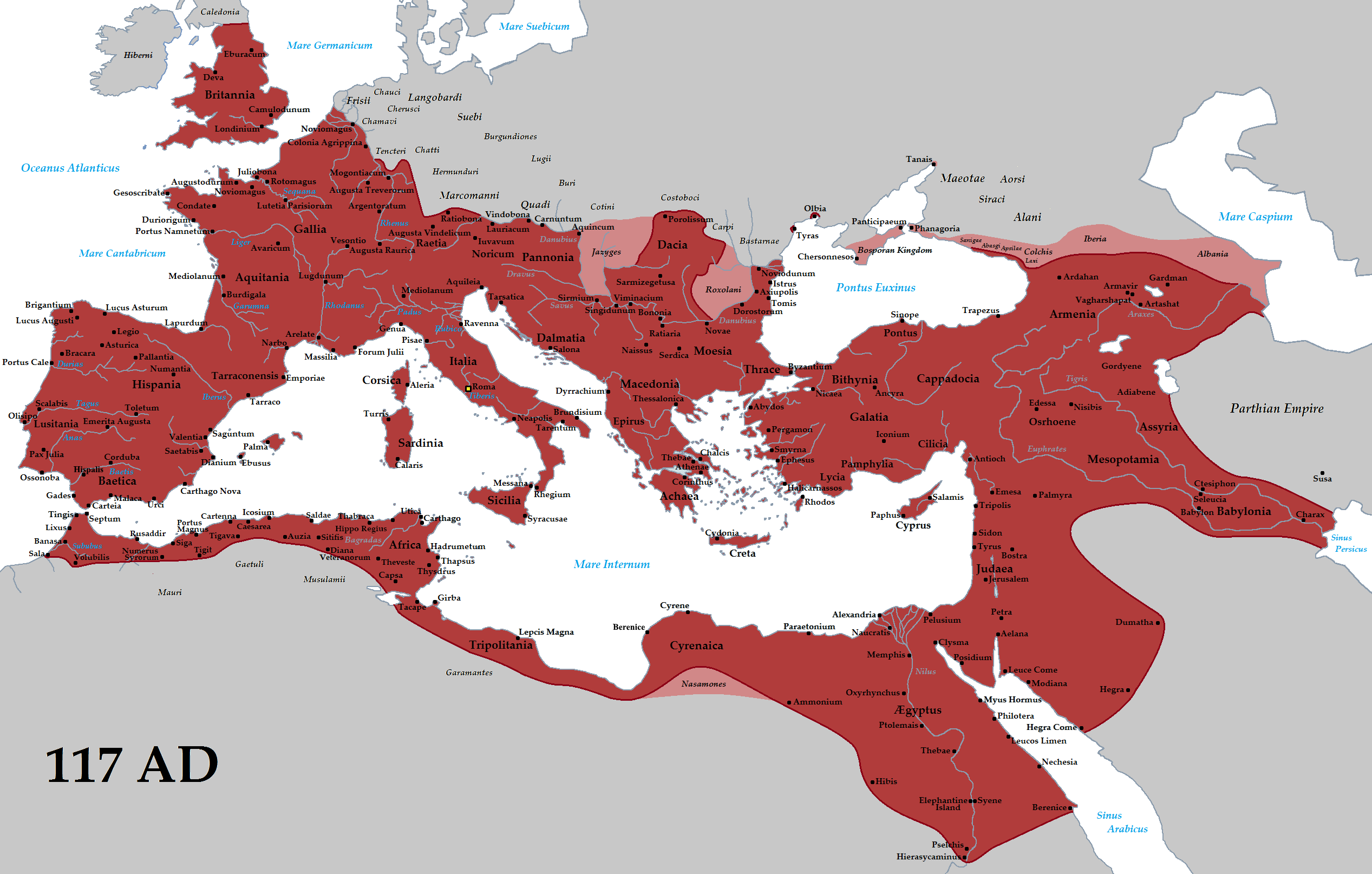
- Roman Empire in AD 117 at its greatest territorial extent, at the time of Trajan's death Vassal states (Note: Regions east of the Euphrates were held only in the years 116–117.)

- Roman territorial evolution from the rise of the city-state of Rome to the fall of the Western Roman Empire
- Capital: Rome (27 BC – AD 476) (Note: In 286, Emperor Diocletian divided the Roman Empire into two administrative units–East and West–an arrangement that periodically returned until the two halves were permanently divided in 395. Although the halves were independent in practice, the Romans continued to consider the Roman Empire to be a single undivided state with two co-equal emperors until the fall of the western half in 476/480. Although emperors at times governed from other cities (notably Mediolanum and Ravenna in the West and Nicomedia in the East), Rome remained the de jure capital of the entire Roman Empire. In 330, Emperor Constantine I made Constantinople a second and new capital of the empire ("Second Rome" or "New Rome"). (Note: "...the capital of the Empire was transferred from Rome to Constantinople in the fourth century.") (Note: "Constantine sounded the death knell for Rome as a vital political centre with the dedication of his new imperial capital at Constantinople.") (Note: "As a new capital, Constantinople provided a stage for imperial prestige that did not depend on association with the traditions of the senatorial establishment at Rome.") (Note: "It became Constantinople, capital of the entire Roman Empire.") (Note: "Constantine the Great, the emperor who moved the capital of the Roman Empire from Rome to Constantinople...") For a time, mostly over the course of the later decades of the fourth century, Rome continued to hold greater symbolic status on account of its greater antiquity as imperial capital. From at least 361 onwards, senators belonging to the new senate in Constantinople enjoyed the same status and privileges as senators of the Roman Senate, to which the new senate was largely identical. By 450, Constantinople was much grander in size and adornment than Rome and unquestionably senior in status.); Constantinople (330–1453) (Note: In 1204, the crusaders of the Fourth Crusade captured Constantinople and established the Latin Empire. The city remained under foreign rule until 1261, when it was captured by the Empire of Nicaea (a Byzantine/Roman successor state). Nicaea is usually considered the "legitimate" continuation of the Roman Empire during the "interregnum" 1204–1261 (over its rivals in Trebizond and Thessalonica) since it managed to retake Constantinople. Whether there was an interregnum at all is debatable given that the crusaders envisioned the Latin Empire to be the same empire as its predecessor (and not a new state).)
- Common languages: Official: initially Latin, increasingly Greek as well or instead; Other: Regional languages
- Religion: Imperial cult-driven polytheism (until AD 380); Nicene Christianity (officially from AD 380)
- Demonym: Roman
- Government: Autocracy
  - Emperor: (List)
- Historical era: Classical era to Late Middle Ages (Timeline)

Area
- 25 BC: 2,750,000 km^{2} (1,060,000 sq mi)
- AD 117: 5,000,000 km^{2} (1,900,000 sq mi)
- AD 390: 3,400,000 km^{2} (1,300,000 sq mi)

Population
  - 25 BC: 56,800,000
- Currency: Denarius, sestertius, (Note: Abbreviated "HS". Prices and values are usually expressed in sesterces.) aureus, solidus, nomisma
Preceded by	Succeeded by
Roman Republic	Western Roman Empire; Eastern Roman Empire

The Roman Empire was a state that dominated the Mediterranean sea and much of Europe, Western Asia, and North Africa during the classical period. The Roman Republic had previously conquered most of these territories, which later came under permanent single-person rule following Octavian's rise to power and the establishment of the Augustan Principate in 27 BC. By the late 3rd century AD, the empire had been divided many times. The Western Roman Empire collapsed in 476 AD, whereas the Eastern Roman Empire (also known as the Byzantine Empire) persisted until the fall of Constantinople in 1453.

By 100 BC, the city of Rome had expanded its rule from the Italian peninsula to most of the Mediterranean and beyond. However, it was severely destabilised by civil wars and political conflicts, which culminated in the victory of Octavian over Mark Antony and Cleopatra at the Battle of Actium in 31 BC, and the subsequent conquest of the Ptolemaic Kingdom in Egypt. In 27 BC, the Roman Senate granted Octavian overarching military power (imperium) and the new title of Augustus, marking his accession as the first Roman emperor. The vast Roman territories were organized into senatorial provinces, governed by proconsuls who were appointed by lot annually, and imperial provinces, which belonged to the emperor but were governed by legates.

The first two centuries of the Empire saw unprecedented stability and prosperity known as the Pax Romana (lit. 'Roman Peace'). Rome reached its greatest territorial extent under Trajan (r. 98–117 AD), but increasing trouble and decline began under Commodus (r. 180–192). In the 3rd century, the Empire underwent a 50-year crisis that threatened its existence due to civil war, plagues and barbarian invasions. The Gallic and Palmyrene empires broke away and a series of short-lived emperors led the Empire, which was later reunified under Aurelian (r. 270–275). The civil wars ended with the victory of Diocletian (r. 284–305), who set up two different imperial courts in the Greek East and Latin West. Constantine the Great (r. 306–337), the first Christian emperor, moved the imperial seat from Rome to Byzantium in 330, and renamed it Constantinople. The Migration Period, involving large invasions by Germanic peoples and the Huns, led to the decline of the Western Roman Empire. With the fall of Ravenna to the Germanic Herulians and the deposition of Romulus Augustus in 476 by Odoacer, the Western Empire finally collapsed. The Byzantine (Eastern Roman) Empire survived for another millennium with Constantinople as its sole capital, until the city's fall in 1453. (Note: "After the capture of Constantinople, the capital of the Byzantine Empire became the capital of the Ottoman Empire. The Osmanli Turks called their empire the Empire of Rum (Rome) (Ottoman Turkish: دولت علنإه روم, lit. 'Exalted State of Rome')." In this sense, it could be argued that a "Roman" Empire survived until the early 20th century.)

Due to the Empire's extent and endurance, its institutions and culture had a lasting influence on the development of language, religion, art, architecture, literature, philosophy, law, and forms of government across its territories. The rediscovery of classical science and technology (which formed the basis for Islamic science) in medieval Europe contributed to the Scientific Renaissance and Scientific Revolution. Rome's republican institutions have influenced the Italian city-state republics of the medieval period, the early United States, and modern democratic republics.

== History ==
Animated overview of the Roman territorial history from the Republic until the fall of its last remnant (the Byzantine Empire) in 1453

=== Transition from Republic to Empire ===
Augustus of Prima Porta

Rome had begun expanding shortly after the founding of the Roman Republic in the 6th century BC, though not outside the Italian Peninsula until the 3rd century BC. The Republic was not a nation-state in the modern sense, but a network of self-ruled towns (with varying degrees of independence from the Senate) and provinces administered by military commanders. It was governed by annually elected magistrates (Roman consuls above all) in conjunction with the Senate The 1st century BC was a time of political and military upheaval, which ultimately led to rule by emperors. The consuls' military power rested in the Roman legal concept of imperium, meaning "command" (typically in a military sense). Occasionally, successful consuls or generals were given the honorary title imperator (commander); this is the origin of the word emperor, since this title was always bestowed to the early emperors. (Note: Augustus avoided any association with the ancient kings of Rome. Augustus had replaced his first name with Imperator, a title regularly used by Julius Caesar, thus becoming Imperator Caesar Augustus, which further linked the title with his position. Imperator did not acquire the meaning of "ruler" until the late 1st century. Both Caesar and Augustus evolved into formal titles, the former denoting the heir and the latter the monarch. In some languages, Caesar became the origin of the word "emperor", such as in German (Kaiser) and some Slavic languages (Tsar).)

Rome suffered a long series of internal conflicts, conspiracies, and civil wars from the late second century BC, (see Crisis of the Roman Republic) while greatly extending its power beyond Italy. In 44 BC Julius Caesar was briefly perpetual dictator before being assassinated by a faction that opposed his concentration of power. This faction was driven from Rome and defeated at the Battle of Philippi in 42 BC by Mark Antony and Caesar's adopted son Octavian. Antony and Octavian divided the Roman world between them, but this did not last long. Octavian's forces defeated those of Mark Antony and Cleopatra at the Battle of Actium in 31 BC. In 27 BC the Senate gave him the title Augustus ("venerated") and made him princeps ("foremost") with proconsular imperium, thus beginning the Principate, the first epoch of Roman imperial history. Although the republic stood in name, Augustus had all meaningful authority. During his 40-year rule, a new constitutional order emerged so that, upon his death, Tiberius would succeed him as the new de facto monarch.

=== Pax Romana ===
The so-called "Five Good Emperors" of 96–180 AD

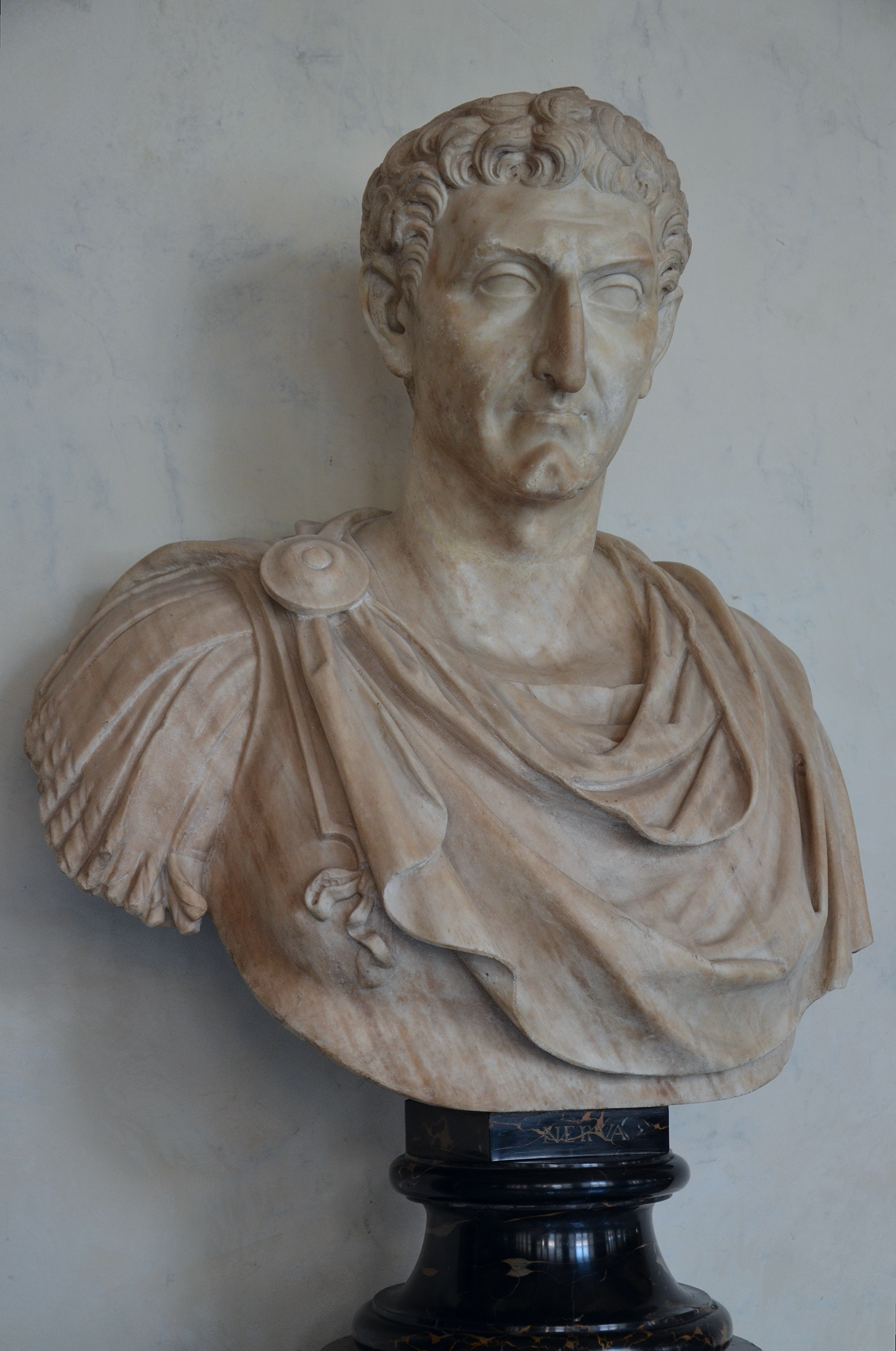
Nerva (r. 96–98)

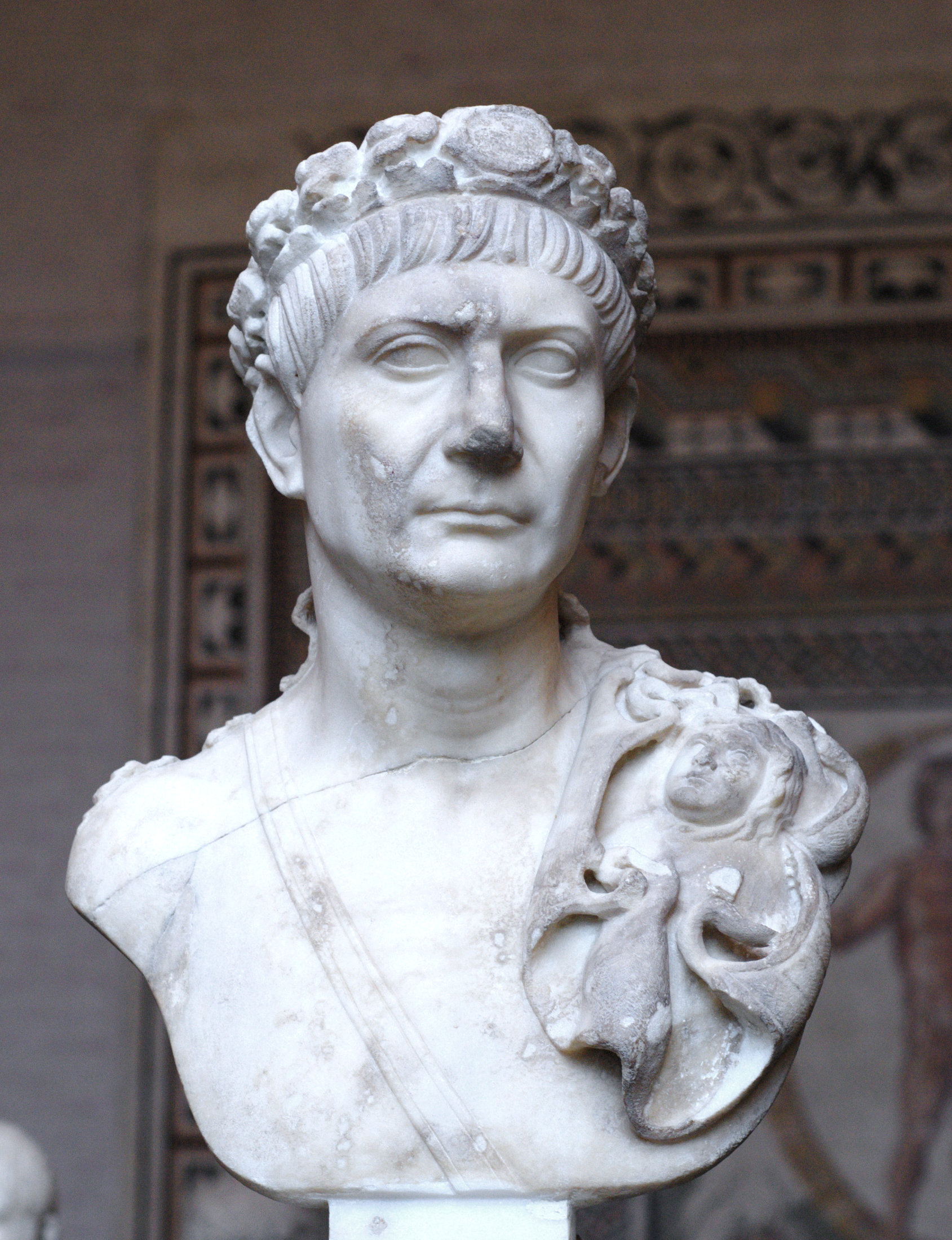
Trajan (r. 98–117)

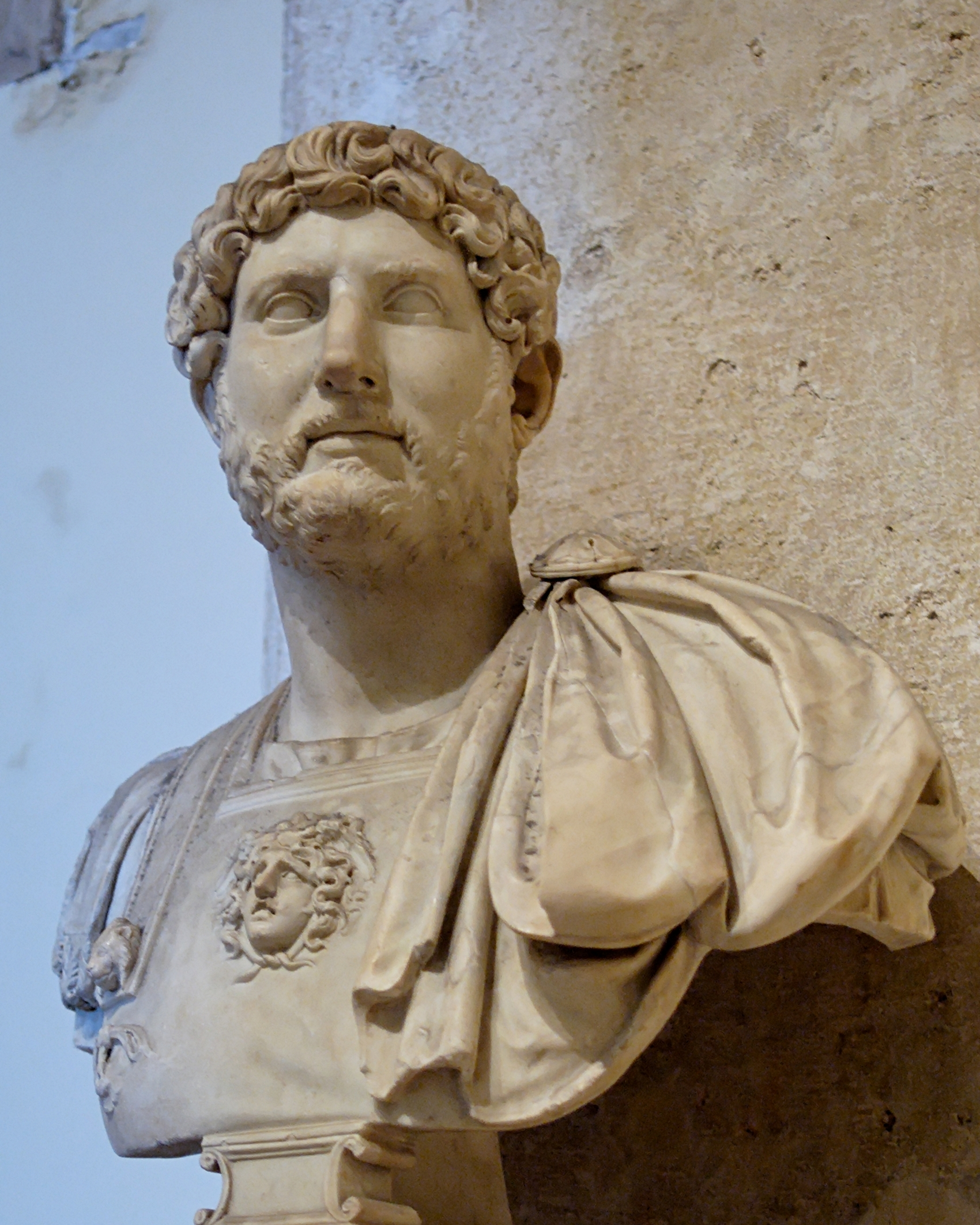
Hadrian (r. 117–138)

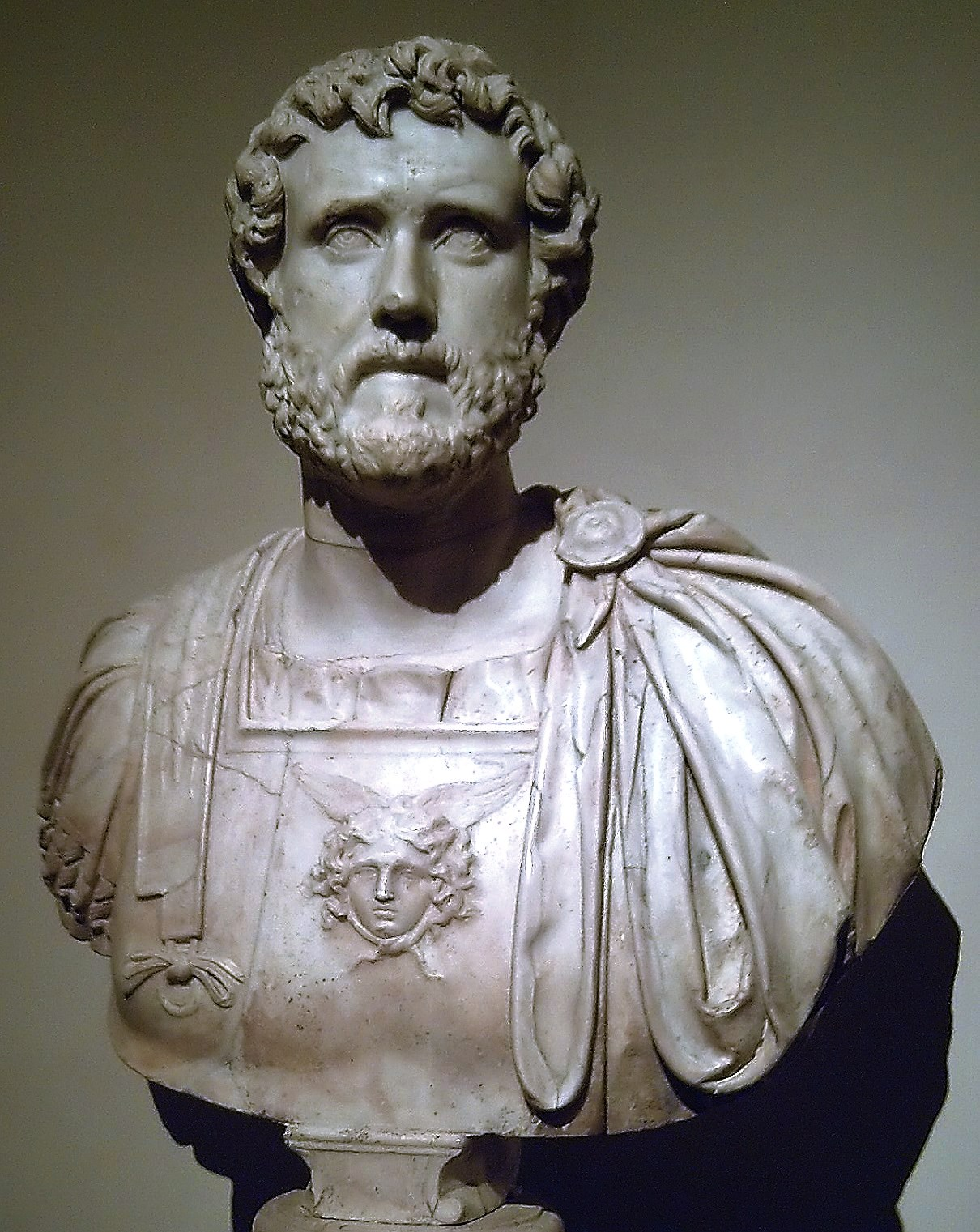
Antoninus Pius (r. 138–161)

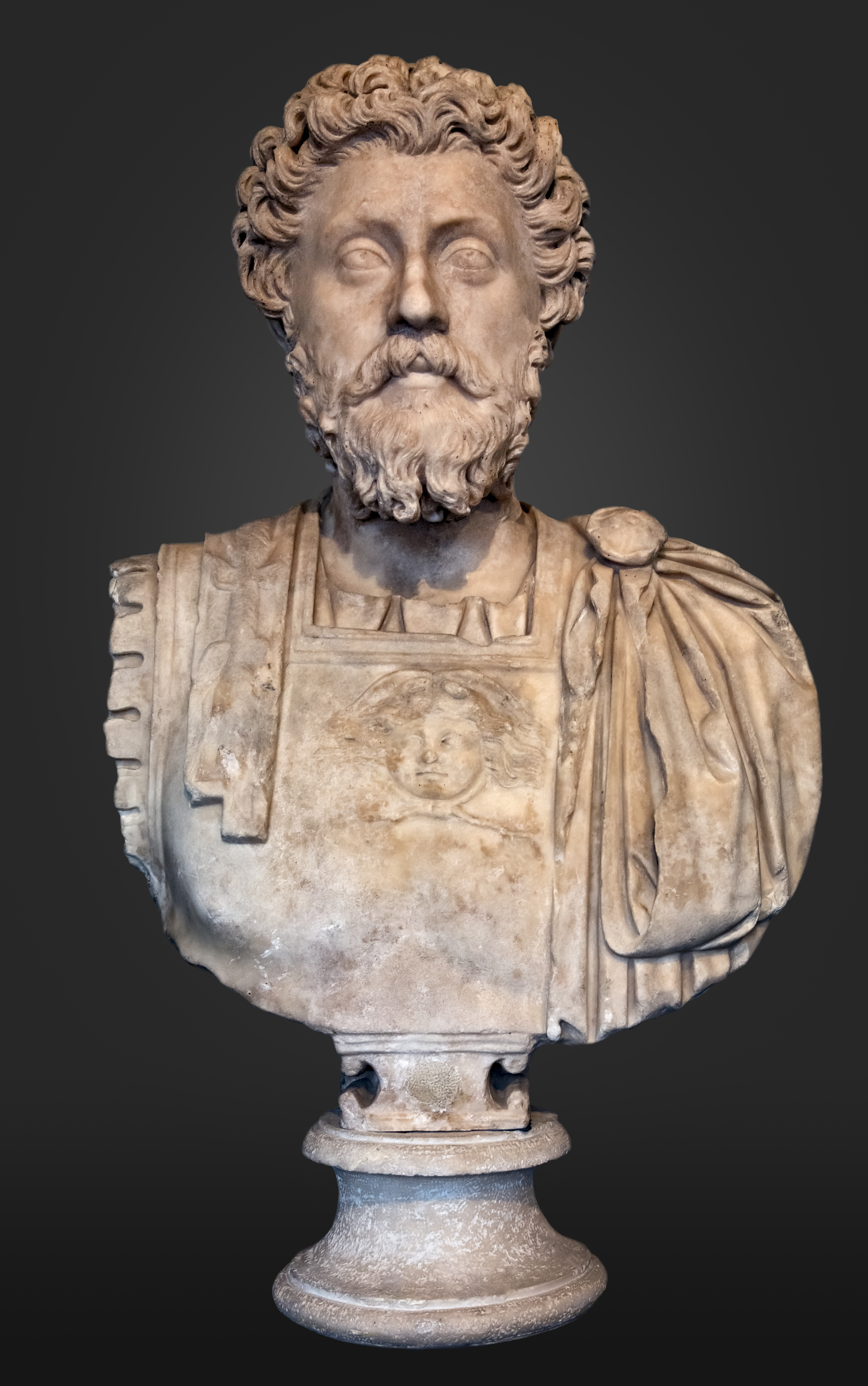
Marcus Aurelius (r. 161–180)

The 200 years that began with Augustus's rule are traditionally regarded as the Pax Romana ("Roman Peace"). The cohesion of the empire was furthered by a degree of social stability and economic prosperity that Rome had never before experienced. Uprisings in the provinces were infrequent and put down "mercilessly and swiftly". The success of Augustus in establishing principles of dynastic succession was limited by his outliving a number of talented potential heirs. The Julio-Claudian dynasty lasted for four more emperors—Tiberius, Caligula, Claudius, and Nero—before it yielded in 69 AD to the strife-torn Year of the Four Emperors, from which Vespasian emerged as the victor. Vespasian became the founder of the brief Flavian dynasty, followed by the Nerva–Antonine dynasty which produced the "Five Good Emperors": Nerva, Trajan, Hadrian, Antoninus Pius, and Marcus Aurelius.

Among the so-called "Five Good Emperors", Hadrian (r. 117–138) is particularly noted for consolidating the empire's frontiers and embarking on ambitious building projects throughout the provinces. In Judaea, which had long been the center of Jewish national and religious life, his reign marked a decisive turning point. After earlier Jewish resistance to Roman rule, Hadrian visited the region in 129/130 AD and refounded Jerusalem as the Roman colony Aelia Capitolina, naming it after his family (Aelius) and the Capitoline Triad. The refoundation overlaid the destroyed Jewish city with a new Roman urban plan, and included the construction of a Temple to Jupiter on the site of the former Jewish Temple. Later tradition and archaeological evidence also indicate a Temple of Venus near the site of the Holy Sepulchre.

Hadrian's measures, combined with restrictions on Jewish practices, helped spark the Bar Kokhba Revolt (132–135 AD). After crushing the uprising, Roman forces expelled most Jews from Jerusalem, barring their entry except on certain days, and rebuilt the city as a statement of imperial power and domination. Most scholars consider Hadrianic Aelia to have been unwalled, with free-standing gate complexes (such as the northern gate beneath today's Damascus Gate) rather than a continuous defensive circuit.

=== Transition from classical to late antiquity ===
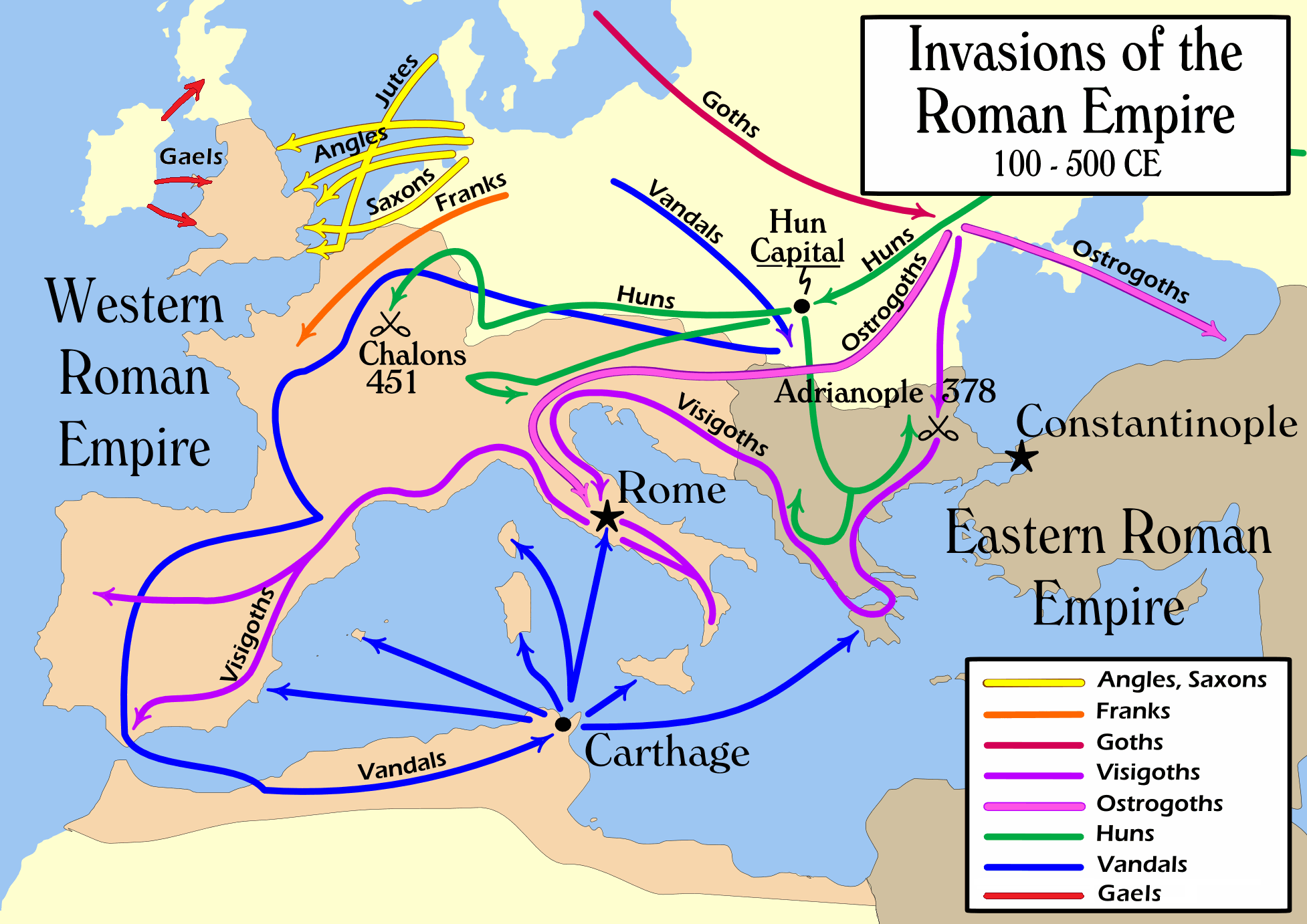
The Barbarian invasions consisted of the movement of (mainly) ancient Germanic peoples into Roman territory. Historically, this event marked the transition between classical antiquity and the Middle Ages.

In the view of contemporary Greek historian Cassius Dio, the accession of Commodus in 180 marked the descent "from a kingdom of gold to one of rust and iron", a comment which has led some historians, notably Edward Gibbon, to take Commodus' reign as the beginning of the Empire's decline.

In 212, during the reign of Caracalla, Roman citizenship was granted to all freeborn inhabitants of the empire. The Severan dynasty was tumultuous; an emperor's reign was ended routinely by his murder or execution and, following its collapse, the Empire was engulfed by the Crisis of the Third Century, a period of invasions, civil strife, economic disorder, and plague. In defining historical epochs, this crisis sometimes marks the transition from classical to late antiquity. Aurelian (r. 270–275) stabilised the empire militarily and Diocletian reorganised and restored much of it in 285. Diocletian's reign brought the empire's most concerted effort against the perceived threat of Christianity, the "Great Persecution".

Diocletian divided the empire into four regions, each ruled by a separate tetrarch. Confident that he fixed the disorder plaguing Rome, he abdicated along with his co-emperor, but the Tetrarchy collapsed shortly after. Order was eventually restored by Constantine the Great, who became the first emperor to convert to Christianity, and who established Constantinople as the new capital of the Eastern Empire. During the decades of the Constantinian and Valentinian dynasties, the empire was divided along an east–west axis, with dual power centres in Constantinople and Rome. Julian, who under the influence of his adviser Mardonius attempted to restore Classical Roman and Hellenistic religion, only briefly interrupted the succession of Christian emperors. Theodosius I, the last emperor to rule over both East and West, died in 395 after making Christianity the state religion.

The Roman Empire by 476, noting western and eastern divisions

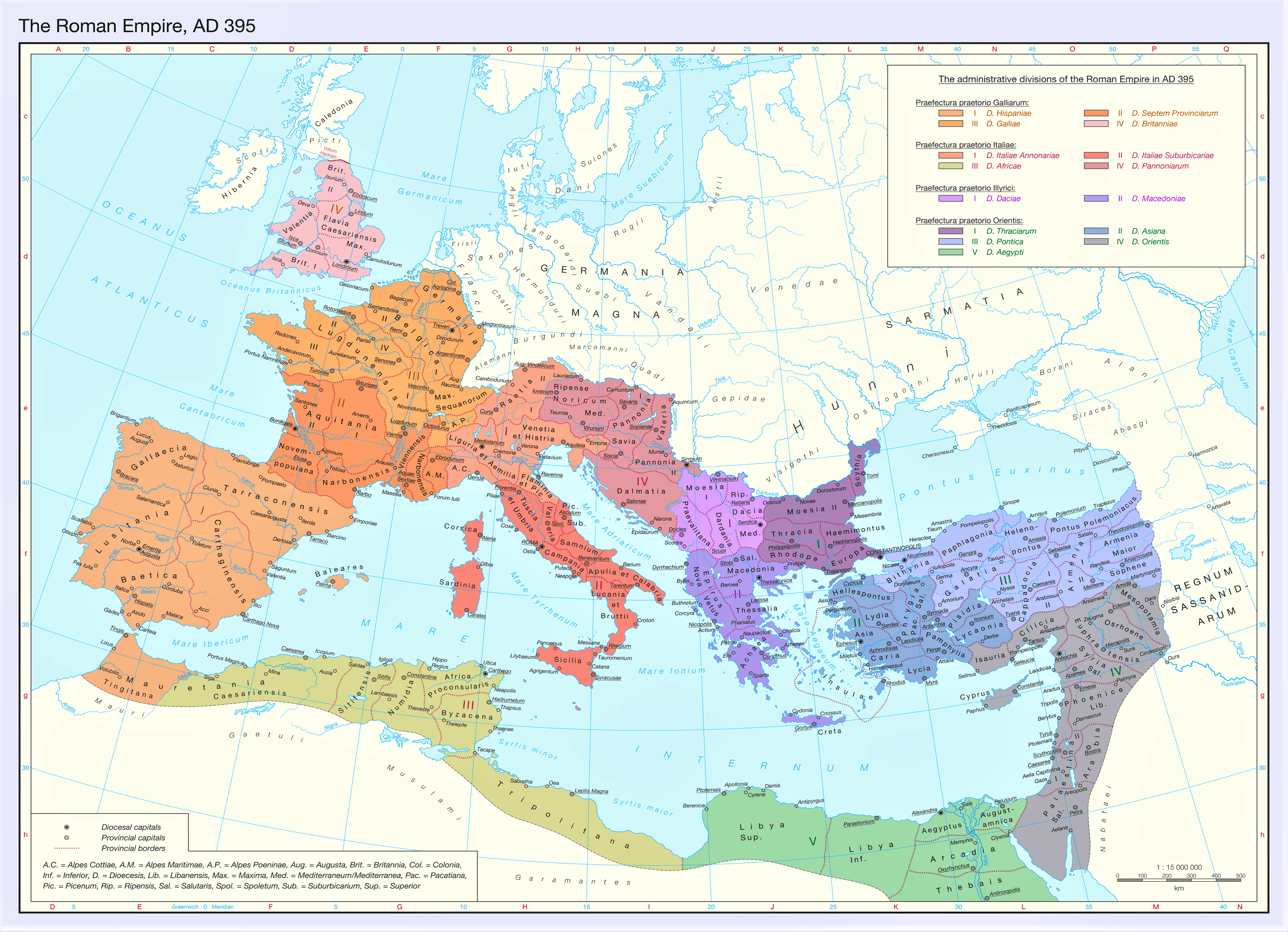
The administrative divisions of the Roman Empire in 395 AD

=== Fall in the West and survival in the East ===
The Western Roman Empire began to disintegrate in the early 5th century. The Romans fought off all invaders, most famously Attila, but the empire had assimilated so many Germanic peoples of dubious loyalty to Rome that the empire started to dismember itself. Most chronologies place the end of the Western Roman Empire in 476, when Romulus Augustulus was forced to abdicate to the Germanic warlord Odoacer. (Note: "Odoacer, who dethroned the last Roman emperor Romulus Augustulus in 476, used neither the imperial insignia nor the colour purple; they were used exclusively by the emperor in Byzantium.") (Note: "The patrician Orestes had married the daughter of Count Romulus, of Petovio in Noricum: the name of Augustus, notwithstanding the jealousy of power, was known at Aquileia as a familiar surname; and the appellations of the two great founders, of the city and of the monarchy, were thus strangely united in the last of their successors ..... The life of this inoffensive youth was spared by the generous clemency of Odoacer; who dismissed him, with his whole family, from the Imperial palace.".)

Odoacer ended the Western Empire by declaring Zeno sole emperor and placing himself as Zeno's nominal subordinate. In reality, Italy was ruled by Odoacer alone. (Note: "The republic (they repeat that name without a blush) might safely confide in the civil and military virtues of Odoacer; and they humbly request, that the emperor would invest him with the title of Patrician, and the administration of the diocese of Italy. ..... His vanity was gratified by the title of sole emperor, and by the statues erected to his honor in the several quarters of Rome; ..... He entertained a friendly, though ambiguous, correspondence with the patrician Odoacer; and he gratefully accepted the Imperial ensigns.") The Eastern Roman Empire, called the Byzantine Empire by later historians, continued until the reign of Constantine XI Palaiologos, the last Roman emperor. He died in battle in 1453 against Mehmed II and his Ottoman forces during the siege of Constantinople. Mehmed II adopted the title of caesar in an attempt to claim a connection to the former Empire. His claim was soon recognized by the Patriarchate of Constantinople, but not by European monarchs.

== Geography and demography ==
The Roman Empire was one of the largest in history, with contiguous territories throughout Europe, North Africa, and the Middle East. The Latin phrase imperium sine fine ("empire without end") expressed the ideology that neither time nor space limited the Empire. In Virgil's Aeneid, limitless empire is said to be granted to the Romans by Jupiter. (Note: "The conquer'd war is due, and the vast world is theirs.") This claim of universal dominion was renewed when the Empire came under Christian rule in the 4th century. (Note: Prudentius (348–413) in particular Christianizes the theme in his poetry. St. Augustine, however, distinguished between the secular and eternal "Rome" in The City of God. See also Fears, J. Rufus (1981), "The Cult of Jupiter and Roman Imperial Ideology", Aufstieg und Niedergang der römischen Welt, vol. II, p. 136, on how Classical Roman ideology influenced Christian Imperial doctrine, Bang, Peter Fibiger (2011), "The King of Kings: Universal Hegemony, Imperial Power, and a New Comparative History of Rome", The Roman Empire in Context: Historical and Comparative Perspectives, John Wiley & Sons and the Greek concept of globalism (oikouménē).) In addition to annexing large regions, the Romans directly altered their geography, for example cutting down entire forests.

Roman expansion was mostly accomplished under the Republic, though parts of northern Europe were conquered in the 1st century, when Roman control in Europe, Africa, and Asia was strengthened. Under Augustus, a "global map of the known world" was displayed for the first time in public at Rome, coinciding with the creation of the most comprehensive political geography that survives from antiquity, the Geography of Strabo. When Augustus died, the account of his achievements (Res Gestae) prominently featured the geographical cataloguing of the Empire. Geography alongside meticulous written records were central concerns of Roman Imperial administration.

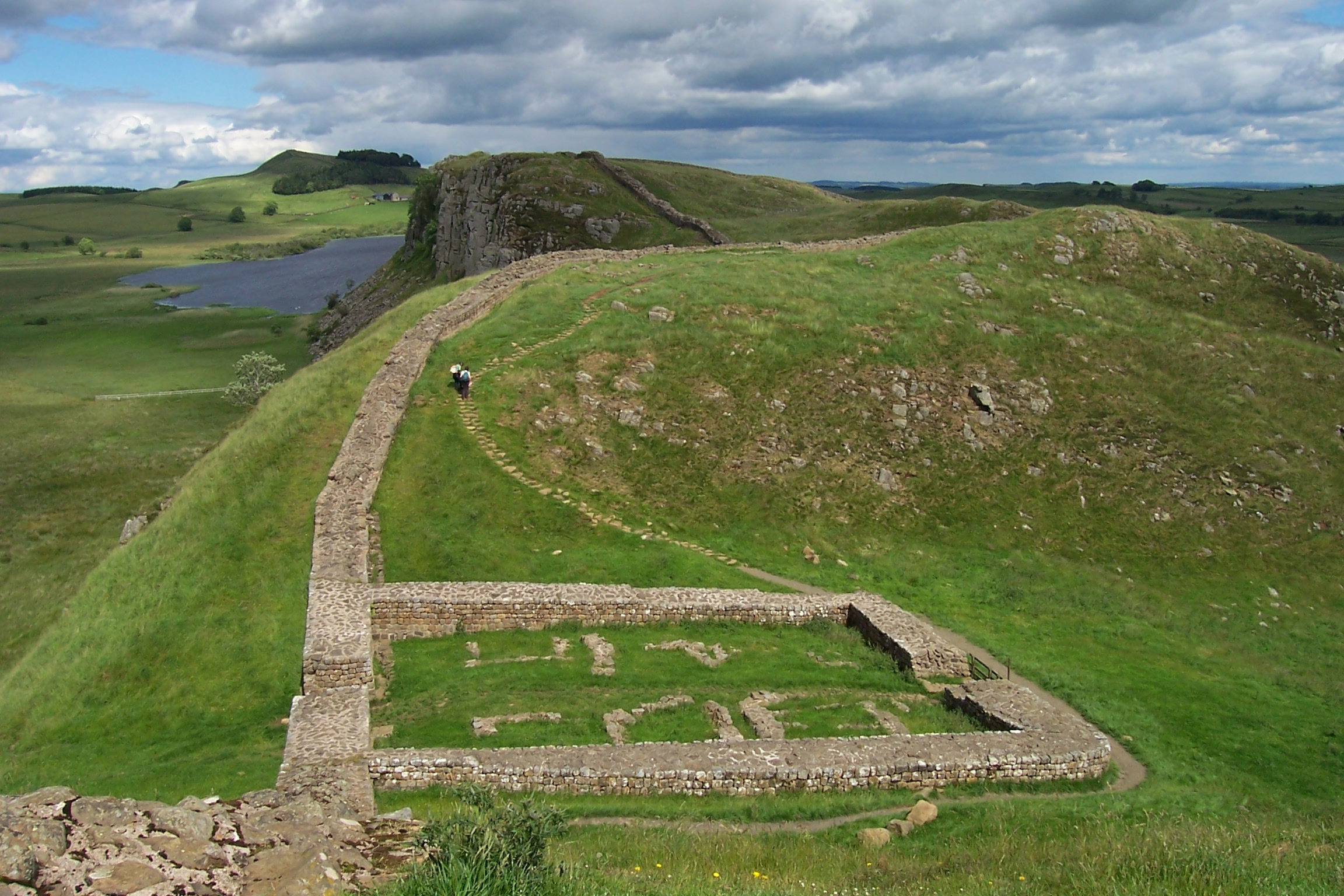
A segment of the ruins of Hadrian's Wall in northern England, overlooking Crag Lough

The Empire reached its largest expanse under Trajan (r. 98–117), encompassing 5 million km^{2}. The traditional population estimate of 55–60 million inhabitants accounted for between one-sixth and one-fourth of the world's total population and made it the most populous unified political entity in the West until the mid-19th century. 21st-century demographic studies have argued for a population peak from 70 million to more than 100 million. Each of the three largest cities in the Empire—Rome, Alexandria, and Antioch—was almost twice the size of any European city at the beginning of the 17th century.

As the historian Christopher Kelly described it:

Then the empire stretched from Hadrian's Wall in drizzle-soaked northern England to the sun-baked banks of the Euphrates in Syria; from the great Rhine–Danube river system, which snaked across the fertile, flat lands of Europe from the Low Countries to the Black Sea, to the rich plains of the North African coast and the luxuriant gash of the Nile Valley in Egypt. The empire completely circled the Mediterranean ... referred to by its conquerors as mare nostrum—'our sea'.

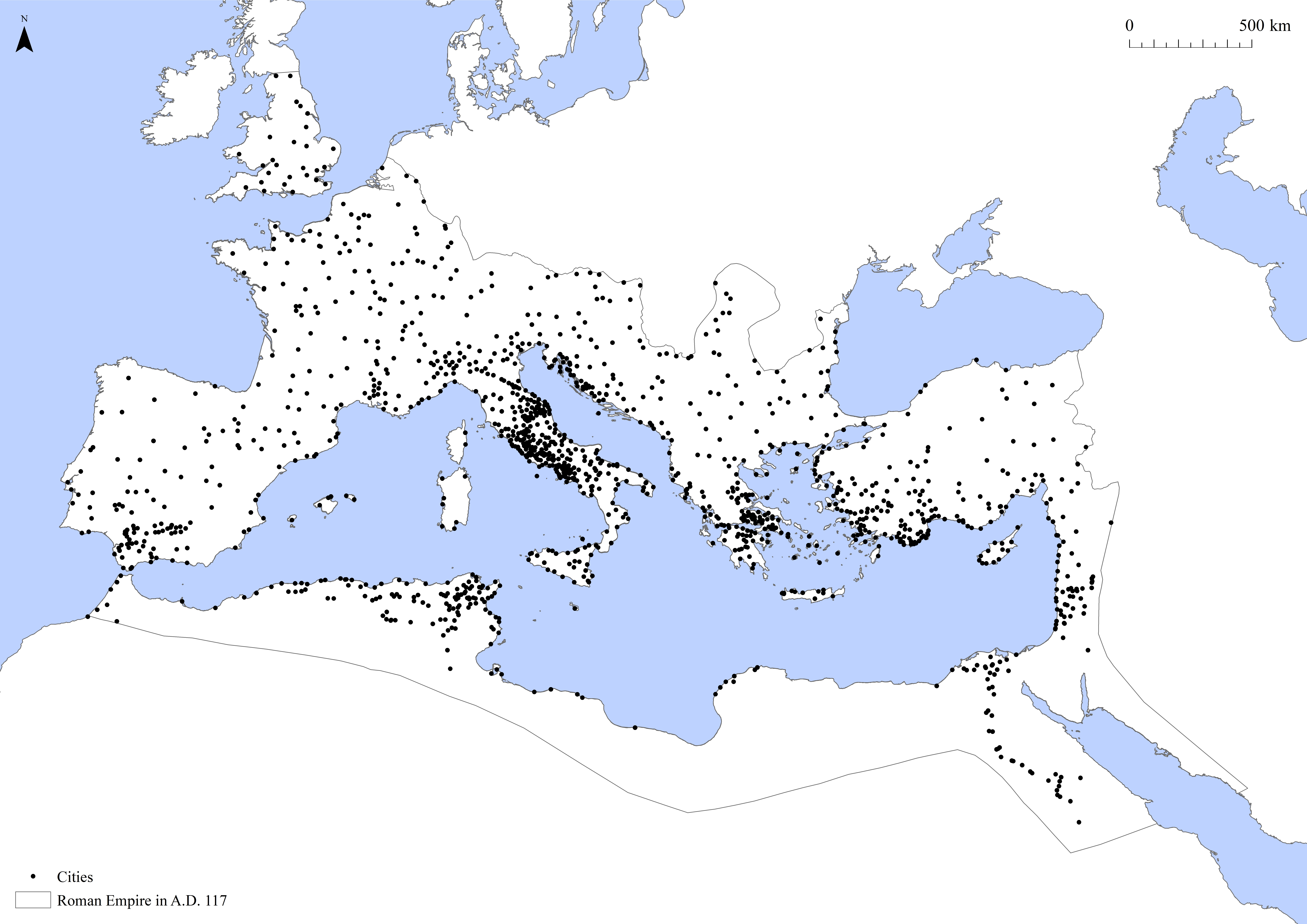
Roman cities in the Imperial period

Trajan's successor Hadrian adopted a policy of maintaining rather than expanding the empire. Borders (fines) were marked, and the frontiers (limites) patrolled. The most heavily fortified borders were the most unstable. Hadrian's Wall, which separated the Roman world from what was perceived as an ever-present barbarian threat, is the primary surviving monument of this effort. In the eastern provinces, rural administration often relied on inscribed boundary stones to demarcate land and regulate taxation.

== Languages ==
Latin and Greek were the main languages of the Empire, (Note: It has been called a state of bilingualism but that's only true of the educated and so Bruno Rochette suggests it's more appropriate as a diglossia but concedes this still does not adequately explain it, as Greek was "high" against Latin's "super-high". Latin experienced a period of spreading from the second century BC, and especially in the western provinces, but not as much in the eastern provinces. In the east, Greek was always the dominant language, a leftover influence from the Hellenistic period that predates the Empire.) but the Empire was deliberately multilingual. Andrew Wallace-Hadrill says "The main desire of the Roman government was to make itself understood". At the start of the Empire, knowledge of Greek was useful to pass as educated nobility and knowledge of Latin was useful for a career in the military, government, or law. Bilingual inscriptions indicate the everyday interpenetration of the two languages.

Latin and Greek's mutual linguistic and cultural influence is a complex topic. Latin words incorporated into Greek were very common by the early imperial era, especially for military, administration, and trade and commerce matters. Greek grammar, literature, poetry and philosophy shaped Latin language and culture.

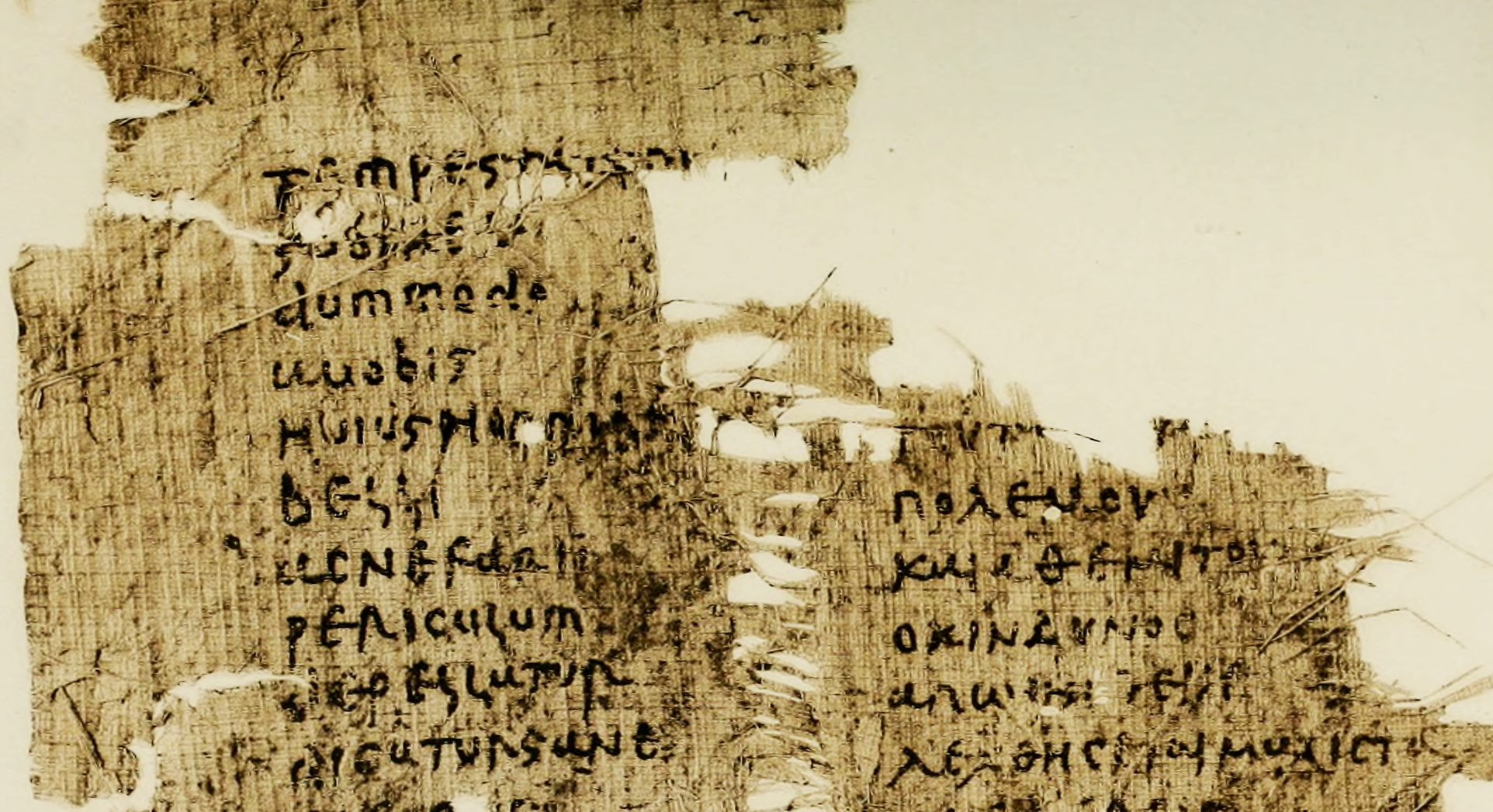
A 5th-century papyrus showing a parallel Latin-Greek text of a speech by Cicero

There was never a legal requirement for Latin in the Empire, but it represented a certain status. High standards of Latin, Latinitas, started with the advent of Latin literature. Due to the flexible language policy of the Empire, a natural competition of language emerged that spurred Latinitas, to defend Latin against the stronger cultural influence of Greek. Over time Latin usage was used to project power and a higher social class. Most of the emperors were bilingual but had a preference for Latin in the public sphere beginning during the Punic Wars. Different emperors up until Justinian would attempt to require the use of Latin in the administration but there is no evidence that a linguistic imperialism existed during the early Empire.

After all freeborn inhabitants were universally enfranchised in 212, many Roman citizens lacked a knowledge of Latin. The wide use of Koine Greek was what enabled the spread of Christianity and reflects its role as the lingua franca of the Mediterranean during the time of the Empire. Following Diocletian's reforms in the 3rd century AD, there was a decline in the knowledge of Greek in the west. Spoken Latin later fragmented into the incipient romance languages in the 7th century AD following the collapse of the Empire's west. (Note: According to Mario Pei (1976), the decisive moment came with the Islamic conquest of North Africa and Iberia, which was followed by numerous raids on land and by sea. All this had the effect of disrupting connections between the western Romance-speaking regions.)

The dominance of Latin and Greek among the literate elite obscures the continuity of other spoken languages within the Empire. Latin, referred to in its spoken form as Vulgar Latin, gradually replaced Celtic and Italic languages. References to interpreters indicate the continuing use of local languages, particularly in Egypt with Coptic, and in military settings along the Rhine and Danube. Roman jurists also show a concern for local languages such as Punic, Gaulish, and Aramaic in assuring the correct understanding of laws and oaths. In Africa, Libyco-Berber and Punic were used in inscriptions into the 2nd century. In Syria, Palmyrene soldiers used their dialect of Aramaic for inscriptions, an exception to the rule that Latin was the language of the military. The last reference to Gaulish was between 560 and 575. (Note: "Veniens vero Arvernos, delubrum illud, quod Gallica lingua Vasso Galatæ vocant, incendit, diruit, atque subvertit. And coming to Clermont [to the Arverni] he [ Chrocus] set on fire, overthrew and destroyed that shrine which they call Vasso Galatæ in the Gallic tongue.") (Note: Le déclin du Gaulois et sa disparition ne s'expliquent pas seulement par des pratiques culturelles spécifiques: Lorsque les Romains conduits par César envahirent la Gaule, au 1er siecle avant J.-C., celle-ci romanisa de manière progressive et profonde. Pendant près de 500 ans, la fameuse période gallo-romaine, le gaulois et le latin parlé coexistèrent; au VIe siècle encore; le temoignage de Grégoire de Tours atteste la survivance de la langue gauloise.) The emergent Gallo-Romance languages would then be shaped by Gaulish. Proto-Basque or Aquitanian evolved with Latin loan words to modern Basque. The Thracian language, as were several now-extinct languages in Anatolia, are attested in Imperial-era inscriptions.

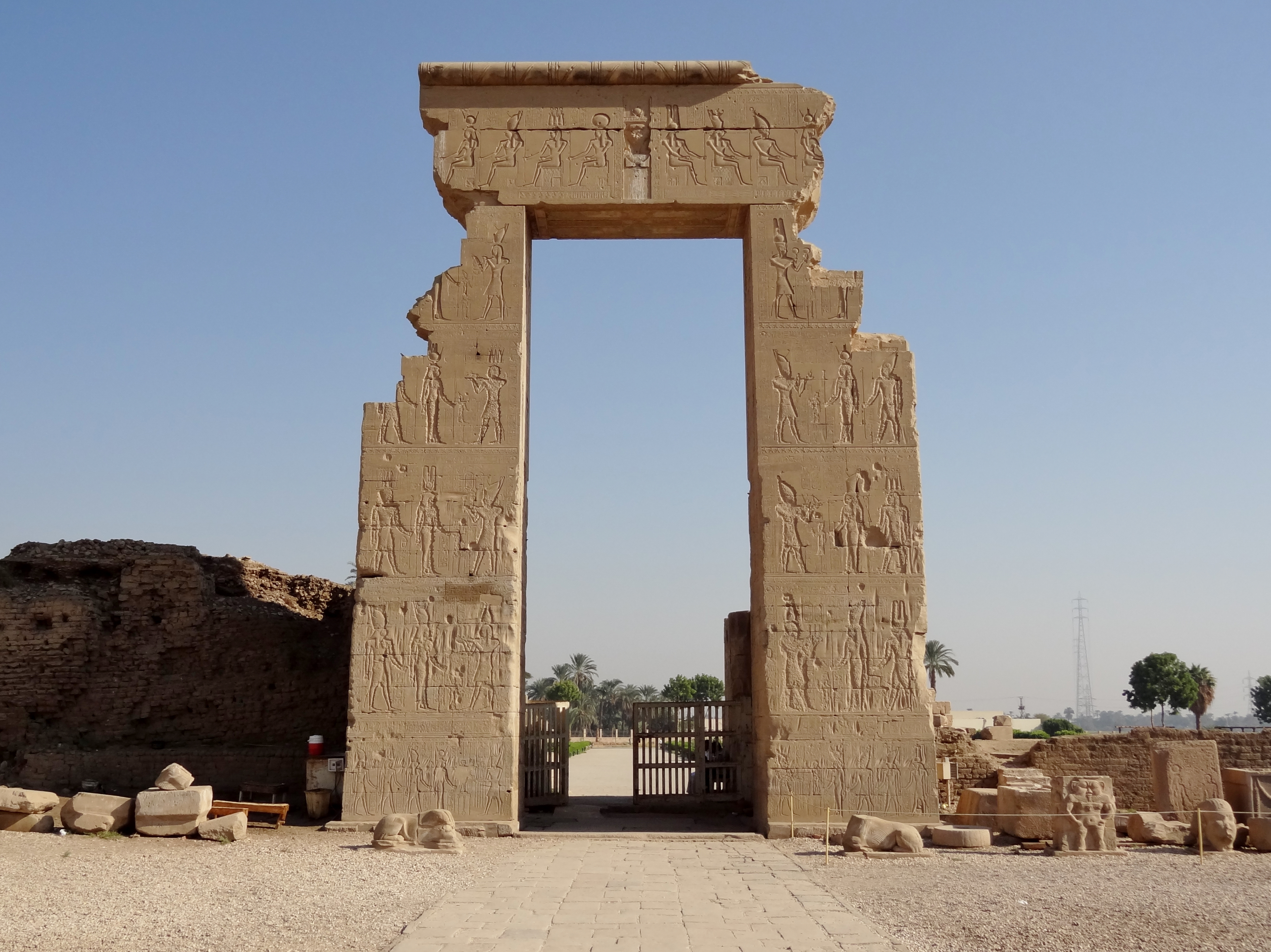
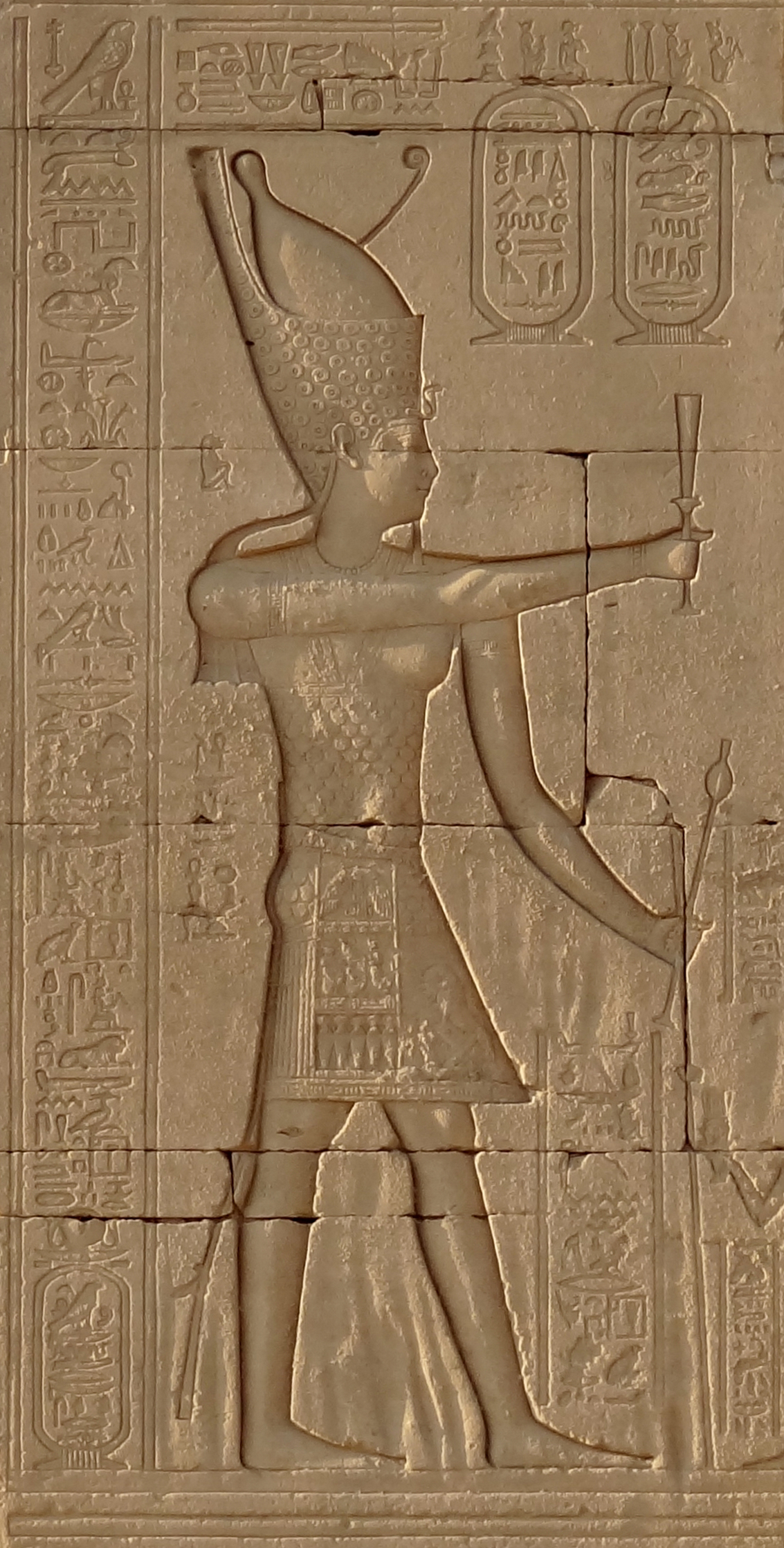
"Gate of Domitian and Trajan" at the northern entrance of the Temple of Hathor, and Roman emperor Domitian as Pharaoh of Egypt on the same gate, together with Egyptian hieroglyphs

== Society ==
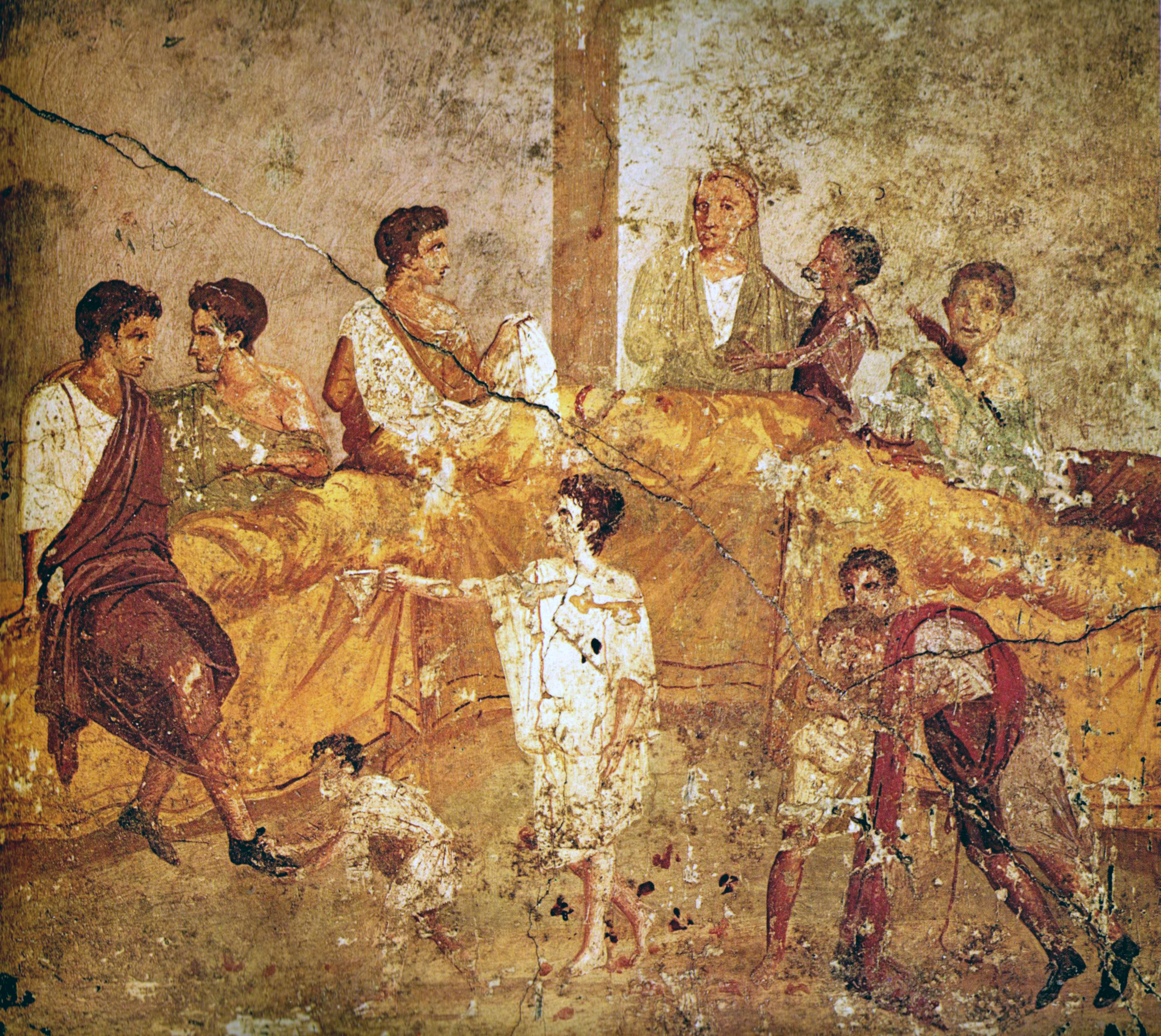
A multigenerational banquet depicted on a wall painting from Pompeii (1st century AD)

The Empire was multicultural, with "astonishing cohesive capacity" to create shared identity while encompassing diverse peoples. Public monuments and communal spaces open to all—such as forums, amphitheatres, racetracks and baths—helped foster a sense of "Romanness".

Roman society had multiple, overlapping social hierarchies. The civil war preceding Augustus caused upheaval, but did not effect an immediate redistribution of wealth and social power. From the perspective of the lower classes, a peak was merely added to the social pyramid. Personal relationships—patronage, friendship (amicitia), family, marriage—continued to influence politics. By the time of Nero, however, it was not unusual to find a former slave who was richer than a freeborn citizen, or an equestrian who exercised greater power than a senator.

The blurring of the Republic's more rigid hierarchies led to increased social mobility, both upward and downward, to a greater extent than all other well-documented ancient societies. Women, freedmen, and slaves had opportunities to profit and exercise influence in ways previously less available to them. Social life, particularly for those whose personal resources were limited, was further fostered by a proliferation of voluntary associations and confraternities (collegia and sodalitates): professional and trade guilds, veterans' groups, religious sodalities, drinking and dining clubs, performing troupes, and burial societies.

=== Legal status ===
According to the jurist Gaius, the essential distinction in the Roman "law of persons" was that all humans were either free (liberi) or slaves (servi). The legal status of free persons was further defined by their citizenship. Most citizens held limited rights (such as the ius Latinum, "Latin right"), but were entitled to legal protections and privileges not enjoyed by non-citizens. Free people not considered citizens, but living within the Roman world, were peregrini, non-Romans. In 212, the Constitutio Antoniniana extended citizenship to all freeborn inhabitants of the empire. This legal egalitarianism required a far-reaching revision of existing laws that distinguished between citizens and non-citizens.

==== Women in Roman law ====
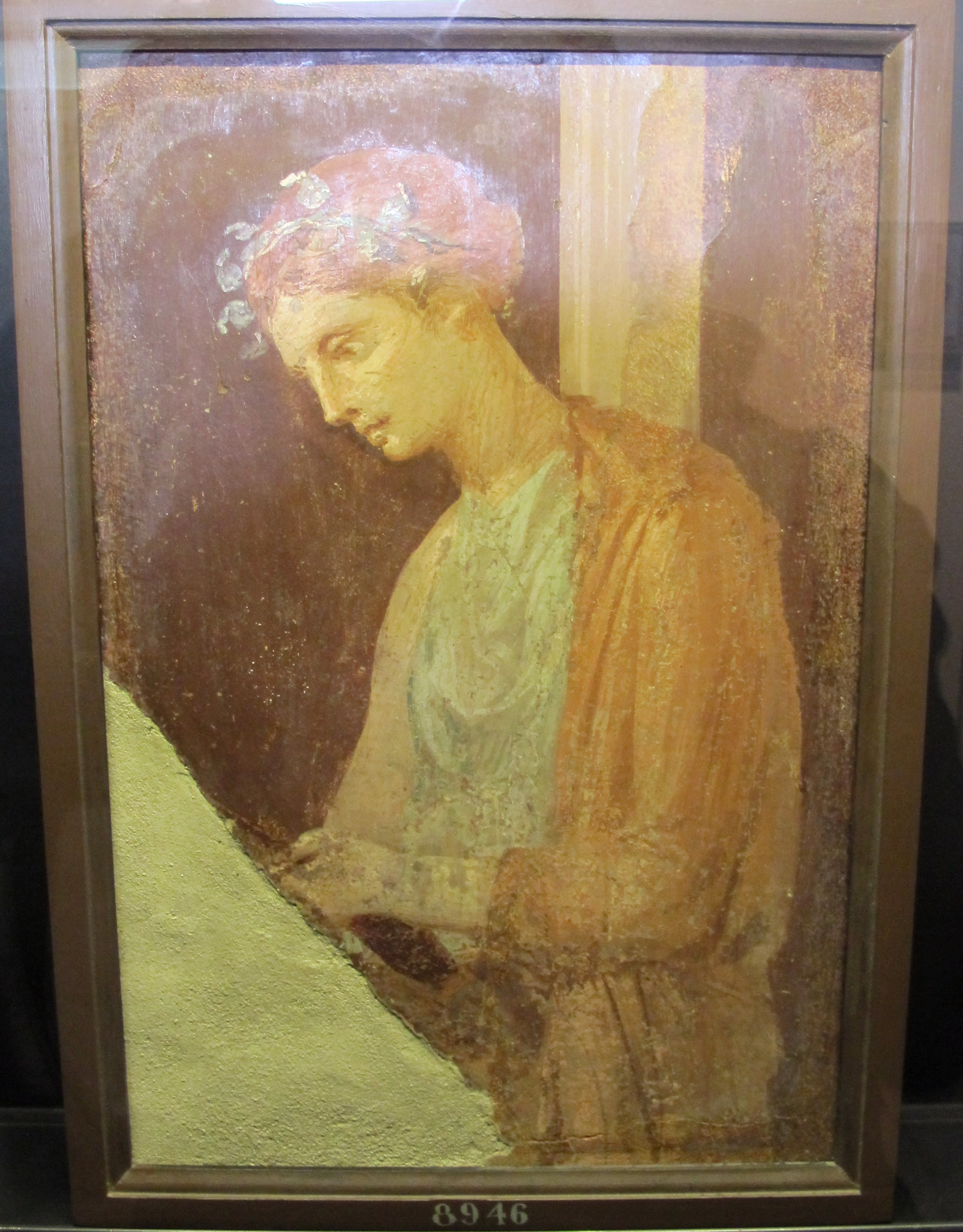
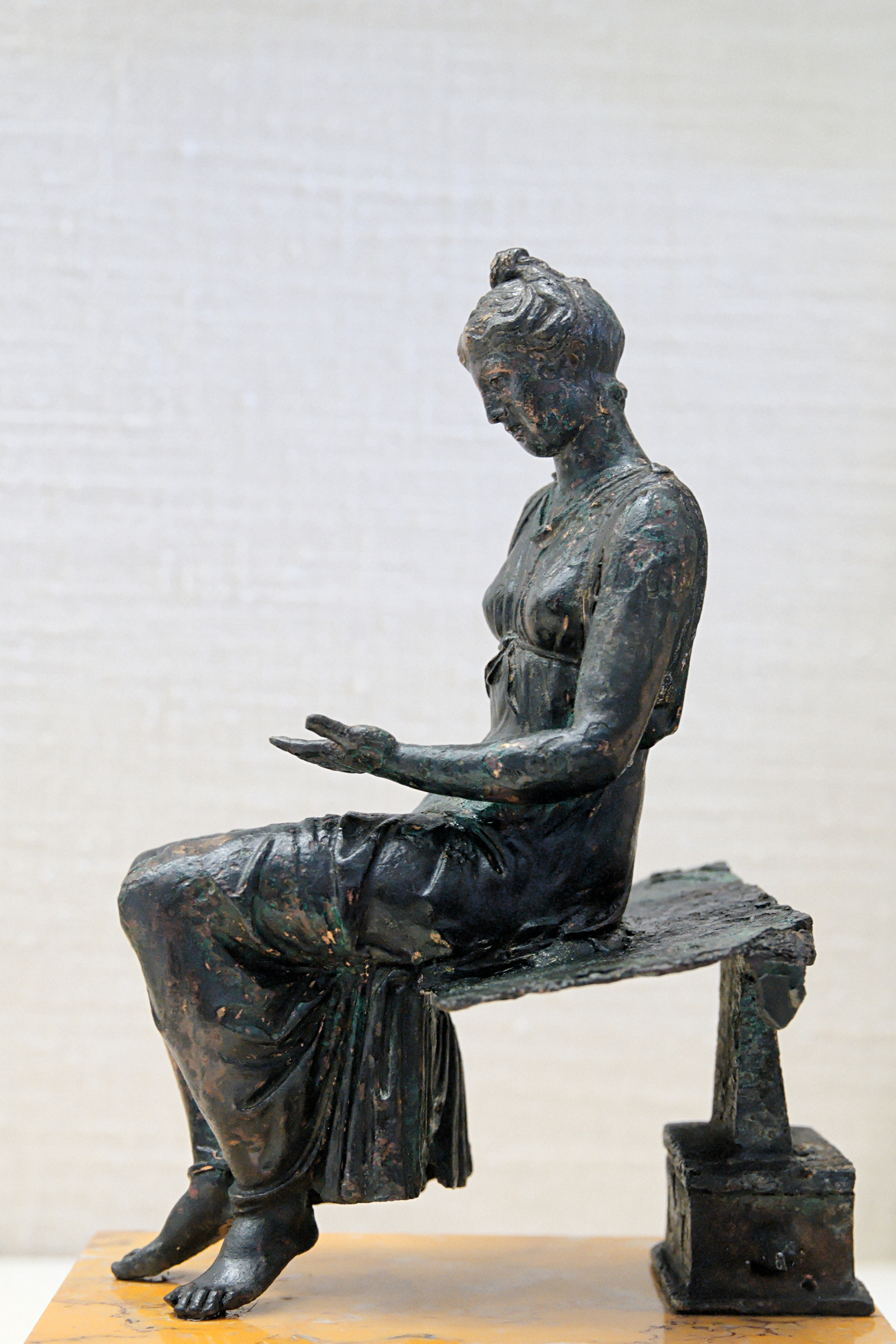
Left: Fresco of an auburn maiden reading a text, Pompeian Fourth Style (60–79 AD), Pompeii, Italy
Right: Bronze statuette (1st century AD) of a young woman reading, based on a Hellenistic original

Freeborn Roman women were considered citizens, but did not vote, hold political office, or serve in the military. A mother's citizen status determined that of her children, as indicated by the phrase ex duobus civibus Romanis natos ("children born of two Roman citizens"). (Note: The civis ("citizen") stands in explicit contrast to a peregrina, a foreign or non-Roman woman In the form of legal marriage called conubium, the father's legal status determined the child's, but conubium required that both spouses be free citizens. A soldier, for instance, was banned from marrying while in service, but if he formed a long-term union with a local woman while stationed in the provinces, he could marry her legally after he was discharged, and any children they had would be considered the offspring of citizens—in effect granting the woman retroactive citizenship. The ban was in place from the time of Augustus until it was rescinded by Septimius Severus in 197 AD.) A Roman woman kept her own family name (nomen) for life. Children most often took the father's name, with some exceptions. Women could own property, enter contracts, and engage in business. Inscriptions throughout the Empire honour women as benefactors in funding public works, an indication they could hold considerable fortunes.

The archaic manus marriage in which the woman was subject to her husband's authority was largely abandoned by the Imperial era, and a married woman retained ownership of any property she brought into the marriage. Technically she remained under her father's legal authority, even though she moved into her husband's home, but when her father died she became legally emancipated. This arrangement was a factor in the degree of independence Roman women enjoyed compared to many other cultures up to the modern period: although she had to answer to her father in legal matters, she was free of his direct scrutiny in daily life, and her husband had no legal power over her. Although it was a point of pride to be a "one-man woman" (univira) who had married only once, there was little stigma attached to divorce, nor to speedy remarriage after being widowed or divorced. Girls had equal inheritance rights with boys if their father died without leaving a will. A mother's right to own and dispose of property, including setting the terms of her will, gave her enormous influence over her sons into adulthood.

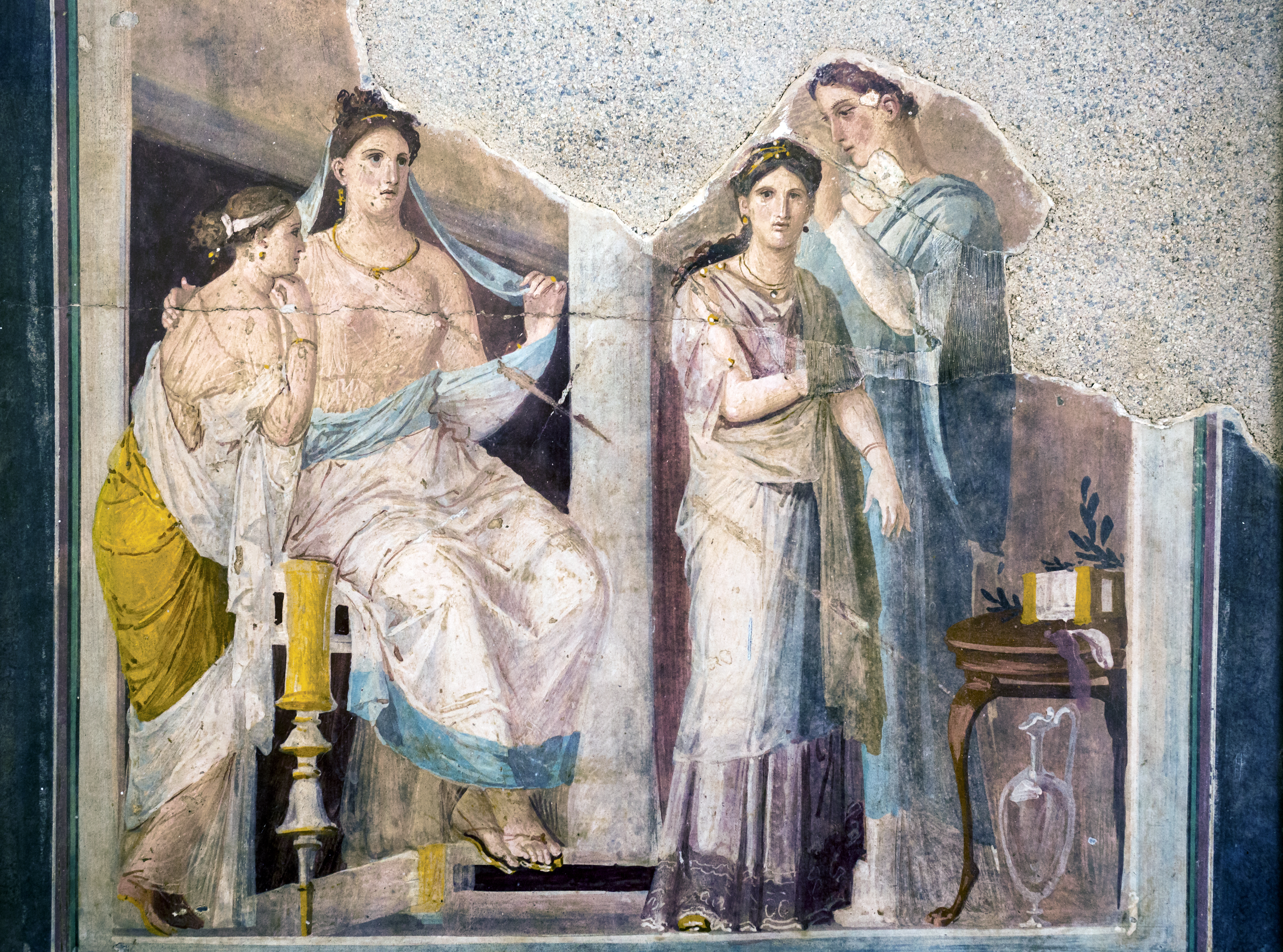
Dressing of a priestess or bride, Roman fresco from Herculaneum, Italy (30–40 AD)

As part of the Augustan programme to restore traditional morality and social order, moral legislation attempted to regulate conduct as a means of promoting "family values". Adultery was criminalized, and defined broadly as an illicit sex act (stuprum) between a male citizen and a married woman, or between a married woman and any man other than her husband. That is, a double standard was in place: a married woman could have sex only with her husband, but a married man did not commit adultery if he had sex with a prostitute or person of marginalized status. (Note: "...the earlier [pre-Augustan] custom allowed much latitude for personal negotiation and gradual social change") Childbearing was encouraged: a woman who had given birth to three children was granted symbolic honours and greater legal freedom (the ius trium liberorum).

==== Slaves and the law ====
At the time of Augustus, it is estimated that the percentage of the population in Roman Italy reduced to slavery was around 20-30%, or one to two millions slaves, (Note: "Recent studies of Italian demography have further increased doubts about a rapid expansion of the peninsula's servile population in this era. No direct evidence exists for the number of slaves in Italy at any time. Brunt has little trouble showing that Beloch's estimate of 2 million during the reign of Augustus is without foundation. Brunt himself suggests that there were about 3 million slaves out of a total population in Italy of about 7.5 million at this date, but he readily concedes that this is no more than a guess. As Lo Cascio has cogently noted, that guess in effect is a product of Brunt's low estimate of the free population.") (Note: Scheidel (2005) has estimated between 1 and 1.5 million slaves in the 1st century BC.) (Note: Jason Paul Wickham notes in his thesis the difficulty in estimating the size of the slave population and the supply needed to maintain and grow the population.) making Rome one of five historical "slave societies" in which slaves constituted at least a fifth of the population and played a major role in the economy. (Note: The others are ancient Athens, and in the modern era Brazil, the Caribbean, and the United States) In urban settings, slaves might be professionals such as teachers, physicians, chefs, and accountants; the majority of slaves provided trained or unskilled labour. Agriculture and industry, such as milling and mining, relied on the exploitation of slaves. Outside Italy, slaves were on average an estimated 10 to 20% of the population, sparse in Roman Egypt but more concentrated in some Greek areas. Expanding Roman ownership of arable land and industries affected preexisting practices of slavery in the provinces. Although slavery has often been regarded as waning in the 3rd and 4th centuries, it remained an integral part of Roman society until gradually ceasing in the 6th and 7th centuries with the disintegration of the complex Imperial economy.

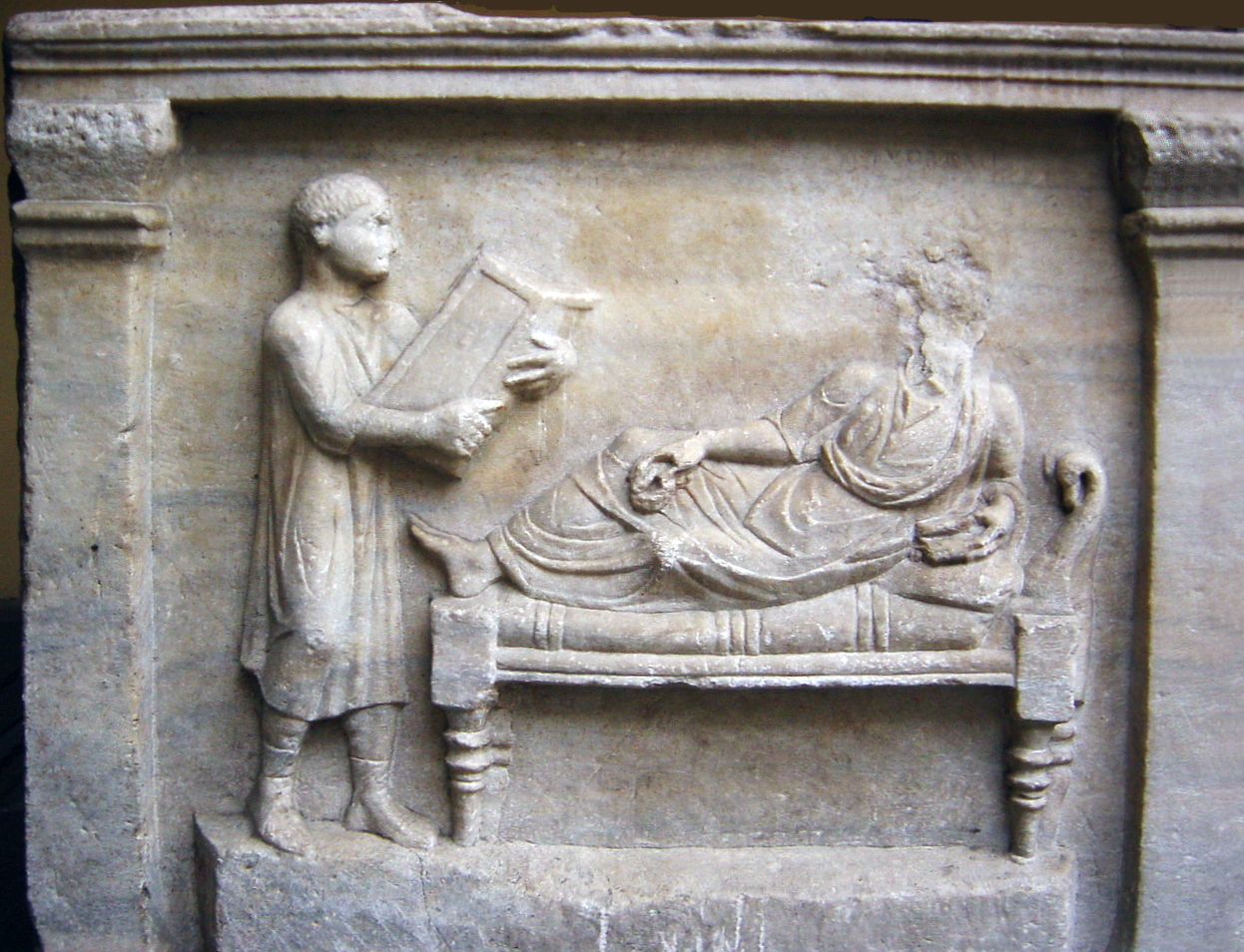
Slave holding writing tablets for his master (relief from a 4th-century sarcophagus)

Laws pertaining to slavery were "extremely intricate". Slaves were considered property and had no legal personhood. They could be subjected to forms of corporal punishment not normally exercised on citizens, sexual exploitation, torture, and summary execution. A slave could not as a matter of law be raped; a slave's rapist had to be prosecuted by the owner for property damage under the Aquilian Law. Slaves had no right to the form of legal marriage called conubium, but their unions were sometimes recognized. Technically, a slave could not own property, but a slave who conducted business might be given access to an individual fund (peculium) that he could use, depending on the degree of trust and co-operation between owner and slave. Within a household or workplace, a hierarchy of slaves might exist, with one slave acting as the master of others. Talented slaves might accumulate a large enough peculium to justify their freedom, or be manumitted for services rendered. Manumission had become frequent enough that in 2 BC a law (Lex Fufia Caninia) limited the number of slaves an owner was allowed to free in his will.

Following the Servile Wars of the Republic, legislation under Augustus and his successors shows a driving concern for controlling the threat of rebellions through limiting the size of work groups, and for hunting down fugitive slaves. Over time slaves gained increased legal protection, including the right to file complaints against their masters. A bill of sale might contain a clause stipulating that the slave could not be employed for prostitution, as prostitutes in ancient Rome were often slaves. The burgeoning trade in eunuchs in the late 1st century prompted legislation that prohibited the castration of a slave against his will "for lust or gain".

Roman slavery was not based on race. (Note: "Roman slavery was a nonracist and fluid system".) Generally, slaves in Italy were indigenous Italians, with a minority of foreigners (including both slaves and freedmen) estimated at 5% of the total in the capital at its peak, where their number was largest. Foreign slaves had higher mortality and lower birth rates than natives and were sometimes even subjected to mass expulsions. The average recorded age at death for the slaves of the city of Rome was seventeen and a half years (17.2 for males; 17.9 for females).

During the period of republican expansionism when slavery had become pervasive, war captives were a main source of slaves. The range of ethnicities among slaves to some extent reflected that of the armies Rome defeated in war, and the conquest of Greece brought a number of highly skilled and educated slaves. Slaves were also traded in markets and sometimes sold by pirates. Infant abandonment and self-enslavement among the poor were other sources. Vernae, by contrast, were "homegrown" slaves born to female slaves within the household, estate or farm. Although they had no special legal status, an owner who mistreated or failed to care for his vernae faced social disapproval, as they were considered part of the family household and in some cases might actually be the children of free males in the family.

==== Freedmen ====
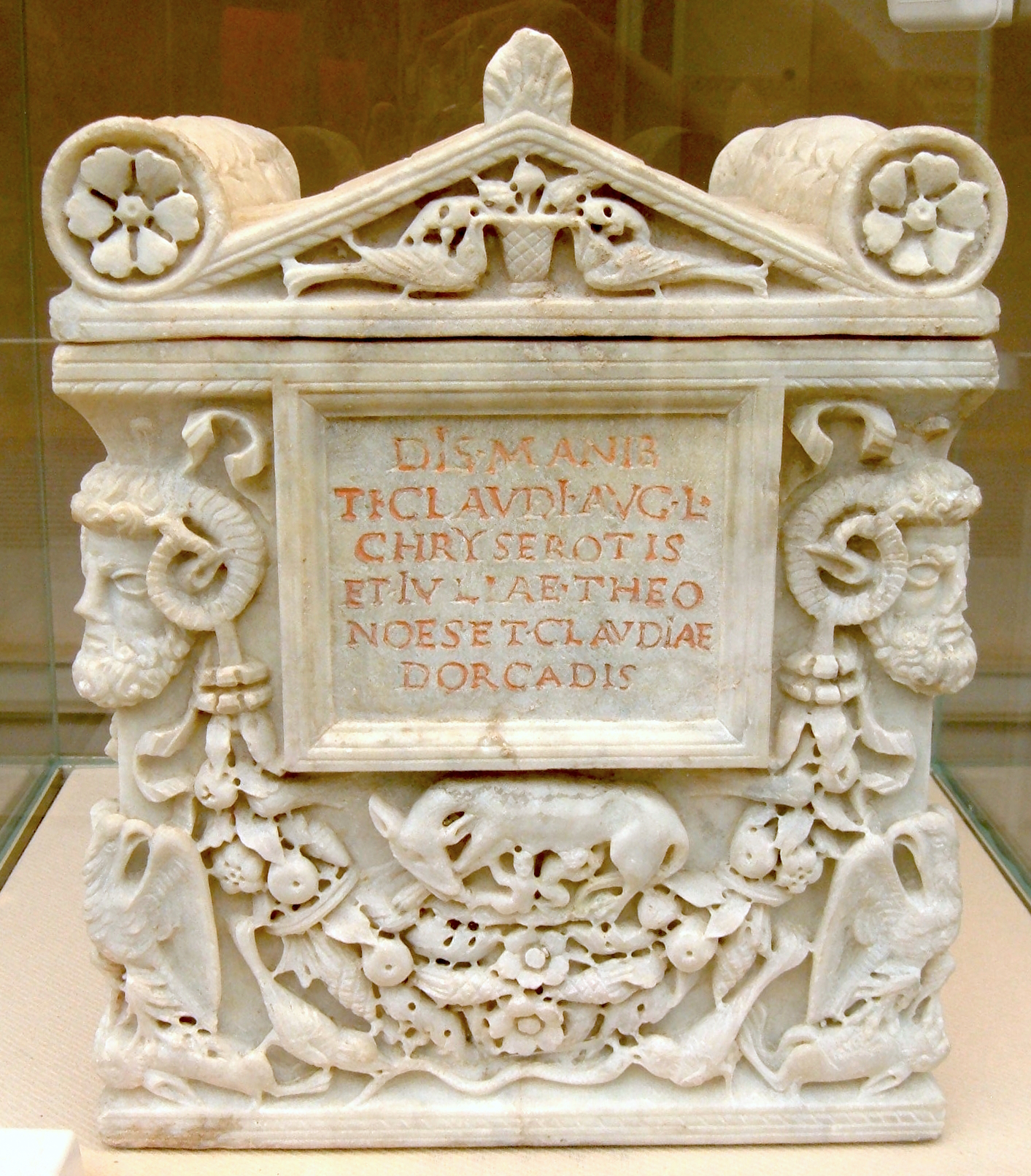
Cinerary urn for the freedman Tiberius Claudius Chryseros and two women, probably his wife and daughter

Rome differed from Greek city-states in allowing freed slaves to become citizens; any future children of a freedman were born free, with full rights of citizenship. After manumission, a slave who had belonged to a Roman citizen enjoyed active political freedom (libertas), including the right to vote. His former master became his patron (patronus): the two continued to have customary and legal obligations to each other. During the early Empire, freedmen held key positions in the government bureaucracy, so much so that Hadrian limited their participation by law. The rise of successful freedmen—through political influence or wealth—is a characteristic of early Imperial society. The prosperity of a high-achieving group of freedmen is attested by inscriptions throughout the Empire.

=== Census rank ===
The Latin word ordo (plural ordines) is translated variously and inexactly into English as "class, order, rank". One purpose of the Roman census was to determine the ordo to which an individual belonged. Two of the highest ordines in Rome were the senatorial and equestrian. Outside Rome, cities or colonies were led by decurions, also known as curiales.

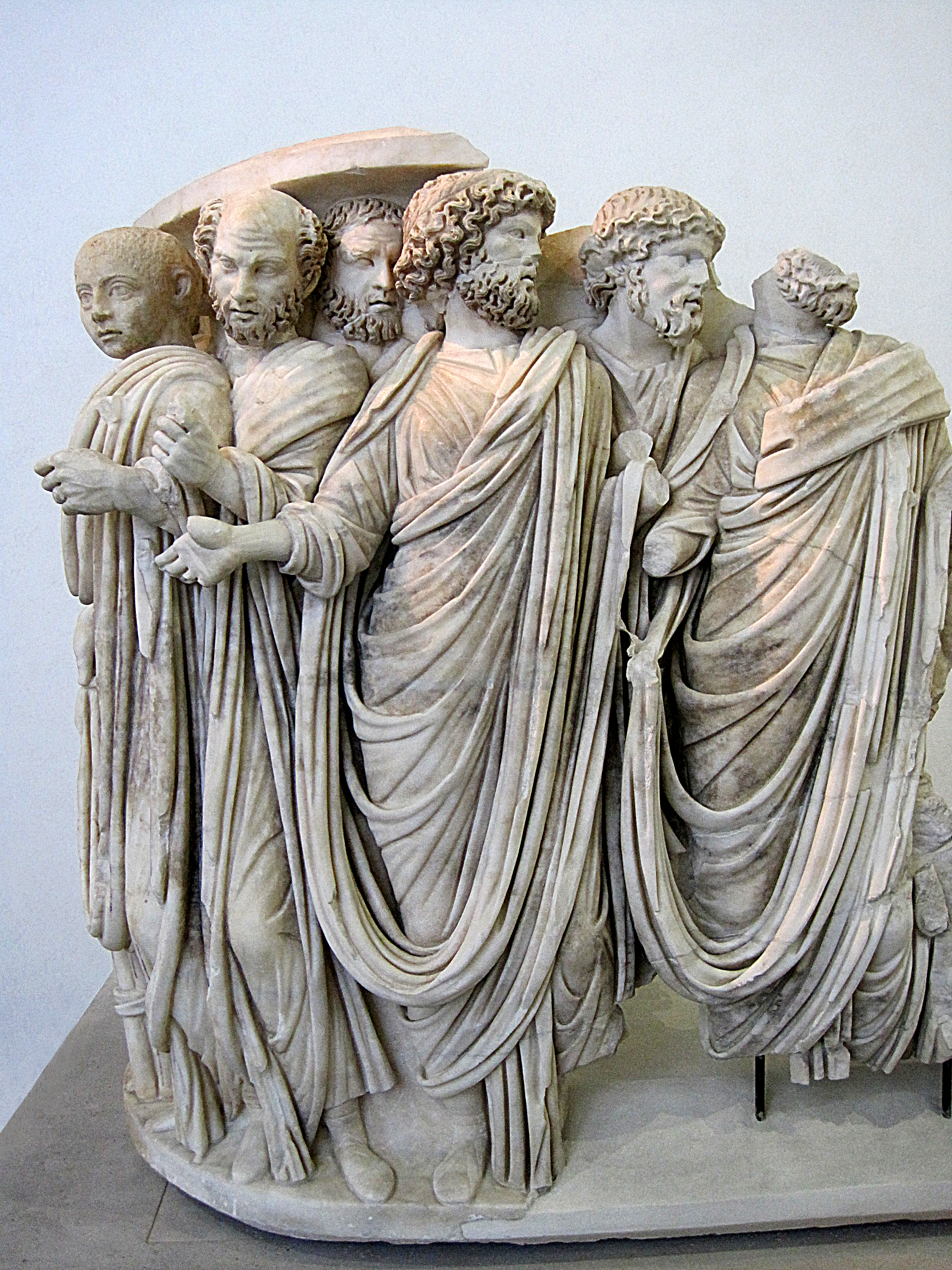
Fragment of a sarcophagus depicting Gordian III and senators (3rd century)

"Senator" was not itself an elected office in ancient Rome; an individual gained admission to the Senate after he had been elected to and served at least one term as an executive magistrate. A senator also had to meet a minimum property requirement of 1 million sestertii. Not all men who qualified for the ordo senatorius chose to take a Senate seat, which required legal domicile at Rome. Emperors often filled vacancies in the 600-member body by appointment. (Note: "The standard complement of 600 was flexible; twenty quaestors, for instance, held office each year and were thus admitted to the Senate regardless of whether there were "open" seats.") A senator's son belonged to the ordo senatorius, but he had to qualify on his own merits for admission to the Senate. A senator could be removed for violating moral standards.

In the time of Nero, senators were still primarily from Italy, with some from the Iberian peninsula and southern France; men from the Greek-speaking provinces of the East began to be added under Vespasian. The first senator from the easternmost province, Cappadocia, was admitted under Marcus Aurelius. (Note: That senator was Tiberius Claudius Gordianus) By the Severan dynasty (193–235), Italians made up less than half the Senate. During the 3rd century, domicile at Rome became impractical, and inscriptions attest to senators who were active in politics and munificence in their homeland (patria).

Senators were the traditional governing class who rose through the cursus honorum, the political career track, but equestrians often possessed greater wealth and political power. Membership in the equestrian order was based on property; in Rome's early days, equites or knights had been distinguished by their ability to serve as mounted warriors, but cavalry service was a separate function in the Empire. (Note: The relation of the equestrian order to the "public horse" and Roman cavalry parades and demonstrations (such as the Lusus Troiae) is complex, but those who participated in the latter seem, for instance, to have been the equites who were accorded the high-status (and quite limited) seating at the theatre by the Lex Roscia theatralis. Senators could not possess the "public horse".) A census valuation of 400,000 sesterces and three generations of free birth qualified a man as an equestrian. The census of 28 BC uncovered large numbers of men who qualified, and in 14 AD, a thousand equestrians were registered at Cádiz and Padua alone. (Note: Ancient Gades, in Roman Spain (now Cádiz), and Patavium, in the Celtic north of Italy (now Padua), were atypically wealthy cities, and having 500 equestrians in one city was unusual.) Equestrians rose through a military career track (tres militiae) to become highly placed prefects and procurators within the Imperial administration.

The rise of provincial men to the senatorial and equestrian orders is an aspect of social mobility in the early Empire. Roman aristocracy was based on competition, and unlike later European nobility, a Roman family could not maintain its position merely through hereditary succession or having title to lands. Admission to the higher ordines brought distinction and privileges, but also responsibilities. In antiquity, a city depended on its leading citizens to fund public works, events, and services (munera). Maintaining one's rank required massive personal expenditures. Decurions were so vital for the functioning of cities that in the later Empire, as the ranks of the town councils became depleted, those who had risen to the Senate were encouraged to return to their hometowns, in an effort to sustain civic life.

In the later Empire, the dignitas ("worth, esteem") that attended on senatorial or equestrian rank was refined further with titles such as vir illustris ("illustrious man"). The appellation clarissimus (Greek lamprotatos) was used to designate the dignitas of certain senators and their immediate family, including women. "Grades" of equestrian status proliferated.

==== Unequal justice ====
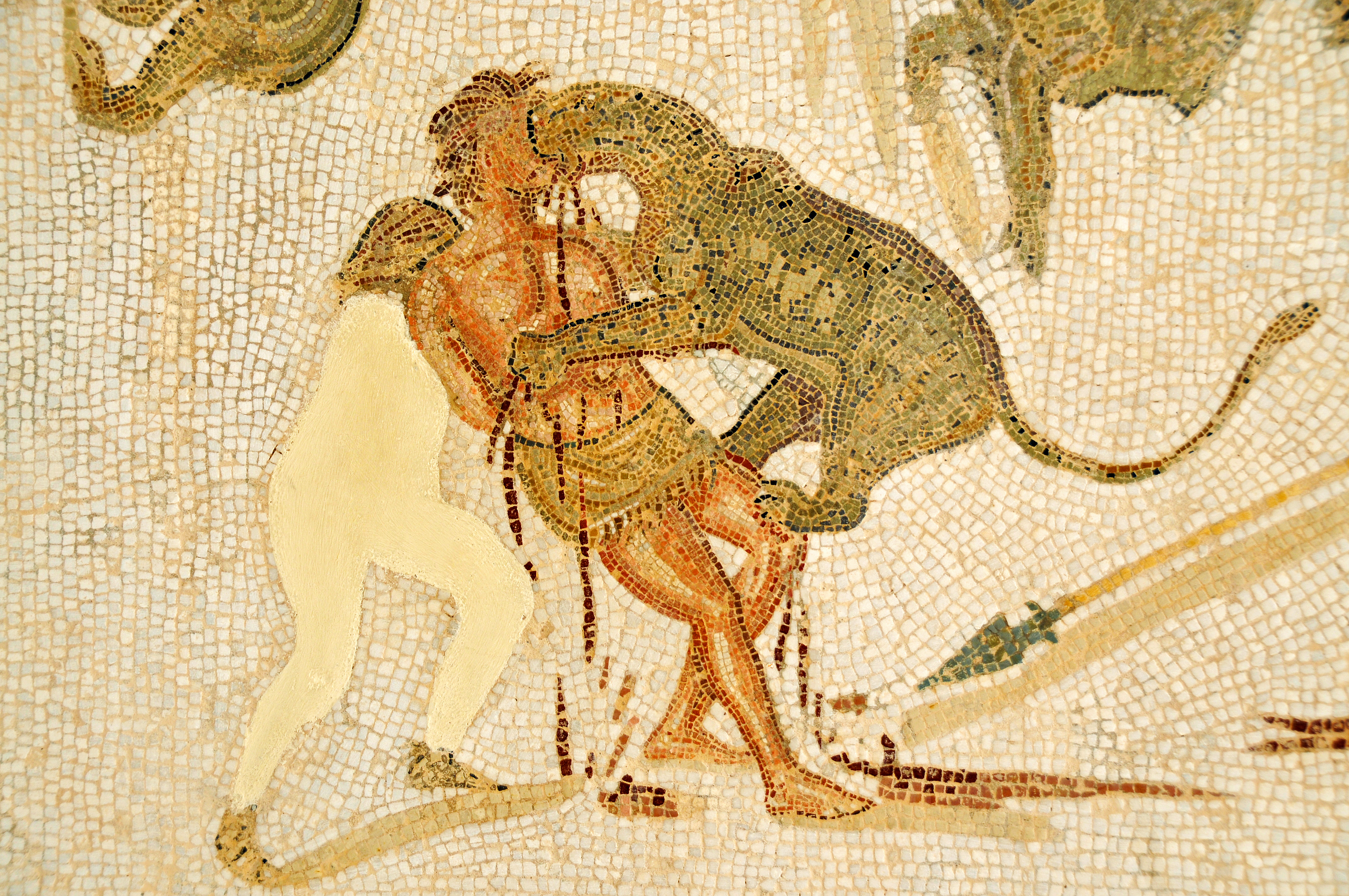
Condemned man attacked by a leopard in the arena (3rd-century mosaic from Tunisia)

As the republican principle of citizens' equality under the law faded, the symbolic and social privileges of the upper classes led to an informal division of Roman society into those who had acquired greater honours (honestiores) and humbler folk (humiliores). In general, honestiores were the members of the three higher "orders", along with certain military officers. The granting of universal citizenship in 212 seems to have increased the competitive urge among the upper classes to have their superiority affirmed, particularly within the justice system. Sentencing depended on the judgment of the presiding official as to the relative "worth" (dignitas) of the defendant: an honestior could pay a fine for a crime for which an humilior might receive a scourging.

Execution, which was an infrequent legal penalty for free men under the Republic, could be quick and relatively painless for honestiores, while humiliores might suffer the kinds of torturous death previously reserved for slaves, such as crucifixion and condemnation to the beasts. In the early Empire, those who converted to Christianity could lose their standing as honestiores, especially if they declined to fulfil religious responsibilities, and thus became subject to punishments that created the conditions of martyrdom.

== Government and military ==
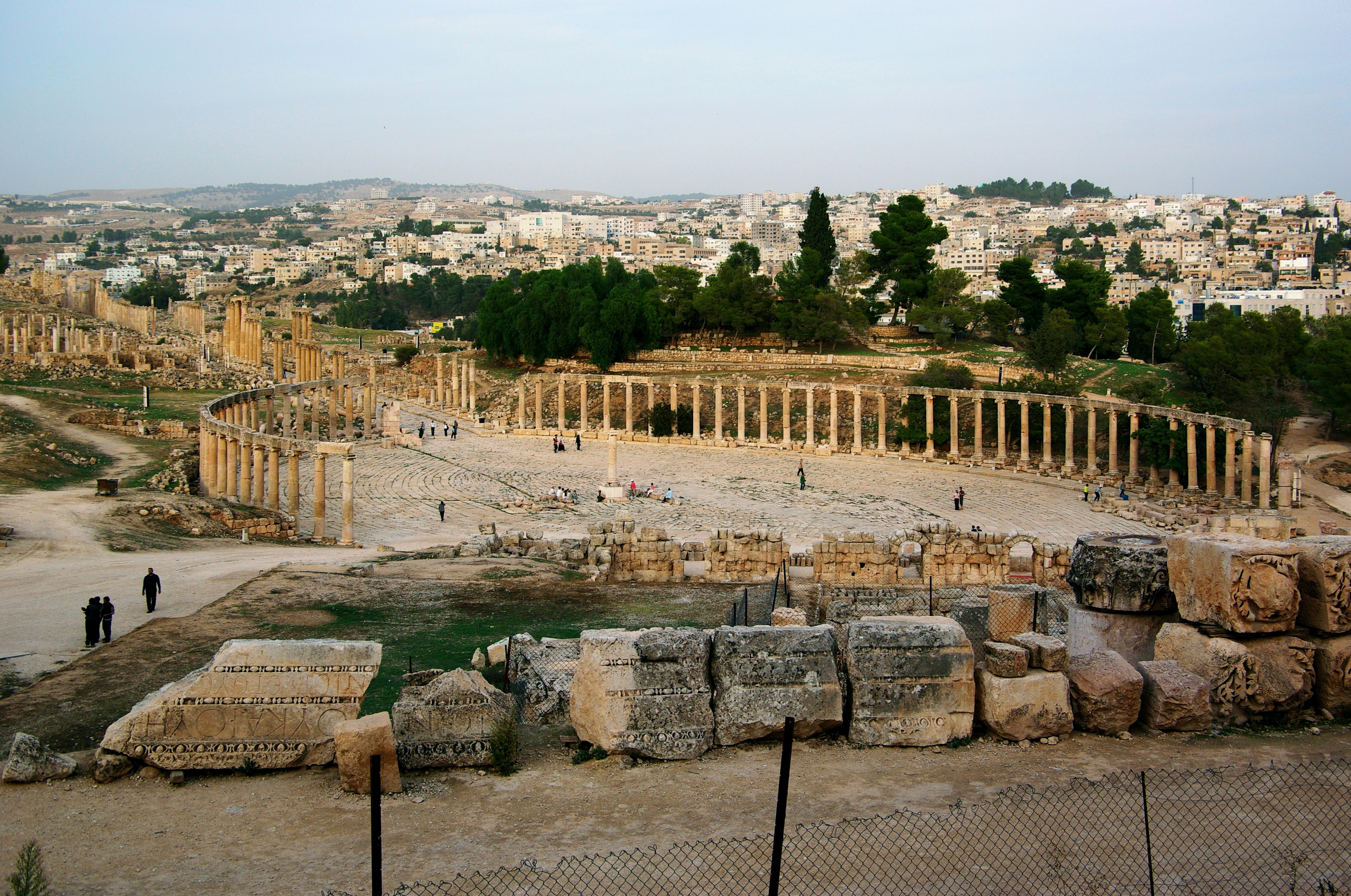
Forum of Gerasa (Jerash in present-day Jordan), with columns marking a covered walkway (stoa) for vendor stalls, and a semicircular space for public speaking

The three major elements of the Imperial state were the central government, the military, and the provincial government. The military established control of a territory through war, but after a city or people was brought under treaty, the mission turned to policing: protecting Roman citizens, agricultural fields, and religious sites. The Romans lacked sufficient manpower or resources to rule through force alone. Cooperation with local elites was necessary to maintain order, collect information, and extract revenue. The Romans often exploited internal political divisions.

Communities with demonstrated loyalty to Rome retained their own laws, could collect their own taxes locally, and in exceptional cases were exempt from Roman taxation. Legal privileges and relative independence incentivized compliance. Roman government was thus limited, but efficient in its use of available resources.

=== Central government ===
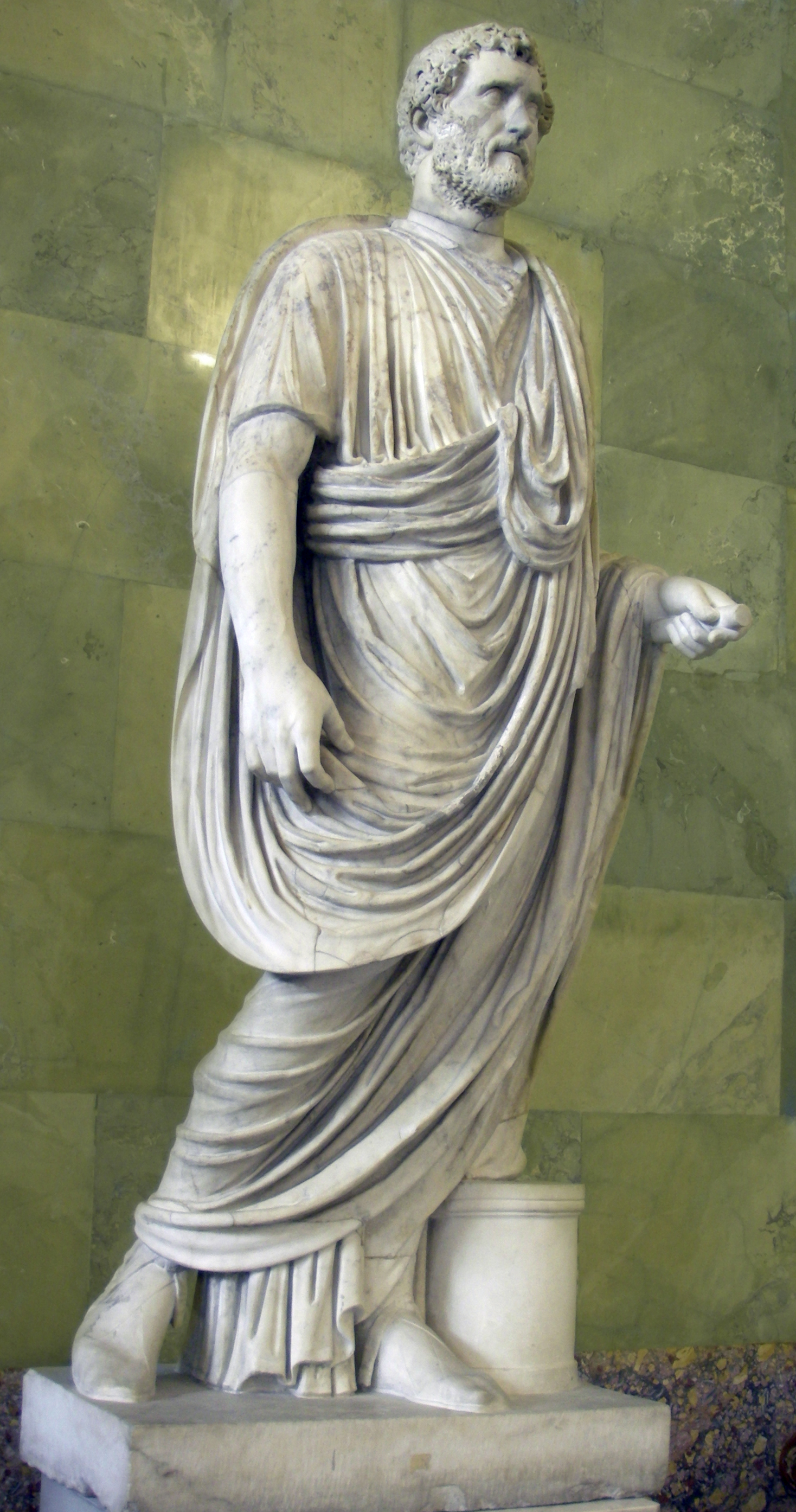
Antoninus Pius (r. 138–161) wearing a toga (Hermitage Museum)

The Imperial cult of ancient Rome identified emperors and some members of their families with divinely sanctioned authority (auctoritas). The rite of apotheosis (also called consecratio) signified the deceased emperor's deification. The dominance of the emperor was based on the consolidation of powers from several republican offices. The emperor made himself the central religious authority as pontifex maximus, and centralized the right to declare war, ratify treaties, and negotiate with foreign leaders. While these functions were clearly defined during the Principate, the emperor's powers over time became less constitutional and more monarchical, culminating in the Dominate. The emperor was the ultimate authority in policy- and decision-making, but in the early Principate, he was expected to be accessible and deal personally with official business and petitions. A bureaucracy formed around him only gradually. The Julio-Claudian emperors relied on an informal body of advisors that included not only senators and equestrians, but trusted slaves and freedmen. After Nero, the influence of the latter was regarded with suspicion, and the emperor's council (consilium) became subject to official appointment for greater transparency. Though the Senate took a lead in policy discussions until the end of the Antonine dynasty, equestrians played an increasingly important role in the consilium. The women of the emperor's family often intervened directly in his decisions.

Access to the emperor might be gained at the daily reception (salutatio), a development of the traditional homage a client paid to his patron; public banquets hosted at the palace; and religious ceremonies. The common people who lacked this access could manifest their approval or displeasure as a group at games. By the 4th century, the Christian emperors became remote figureheads who issued general rulings, no longer responding to individual petitions. Although the Senate could do little short of assassination and open rebellion to contravene the will of the emperor, it retained its symbolic political centrality. The Senate legitimated the emperor's rule, and the emperor employed senators as legates (legati): generals, diplomats, and administrators.

The practical source of an emperor's power and authority was the military. The legionaries were paid by the Imperial treasury, and swore an annual oath of loyalty to the emperor. Most emperors chose a successor, usually a close family member or adopted heir. The new emperor had to seek a swift acknowledgement of his status and authority to stabilize the political landscape. No emperor could hope to survive without the allegiance of the Praetorian Guard and the legions. To secure their loyalty, several emperors paid the donativum, a monetary reward. In theory, the Senate was entitled to choose the new emperor, but did so mindful of acclamation by the army or Praetorians.

=== Military ===
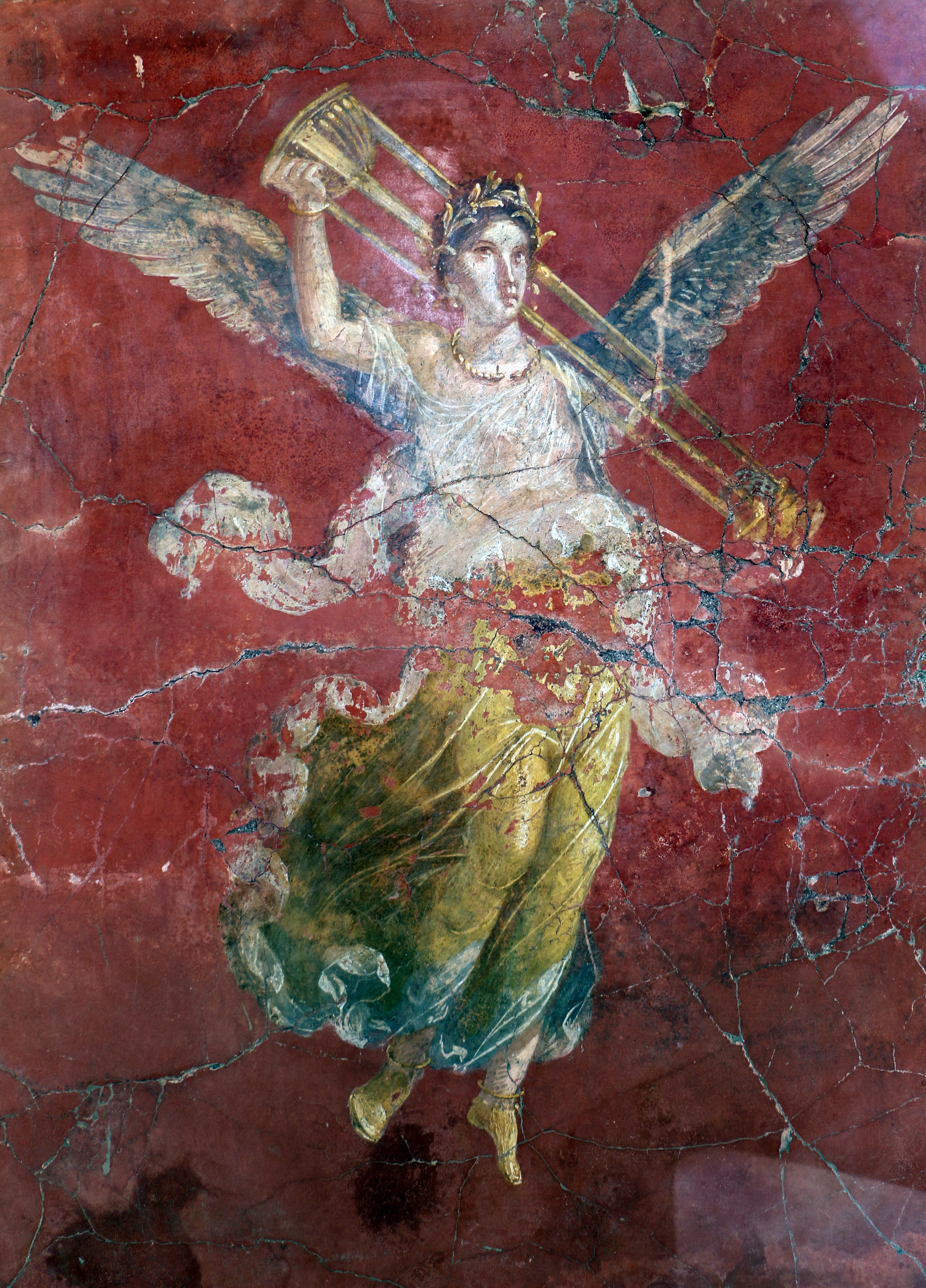
Winged Victory, ancient Roman fresco of the Neronian era from Pompeii

The Roman Empire under Hadrian (ruled 117–138) showing the location of the Roman legions deployed in 125 AD

After the Punic Wars, the Roman army comprised professional soldiers who volunteered for 20 years of active duty and five as reserves. The transition to a professional military began during the late Republic and was one of the many profound shifts away from republicanism, under which an army of conscript citizens defended the homeland against a specific threat. The Romans expanded their war machine by "organizing the communities that they conquered in Italy into a system that generated huge reservoirs of manpower for their army". By Imperial times, military service was a full-time career. The pervasiveness of military garrisons throughout the Empire was a major influence in the process of Romanization.

The primary mission of the military of the early empire was to preserve the Pax Romana. The three major divisions of the military were:

- the garrison at Rome, comprising the Praetorian Guard, the cohortes urbanae and the vigiles, who functioned as police and firefighters;
- the provincial army, comprising the Roman legions and the auxiliaries provided by the provinces (auxilia);
- the navy.

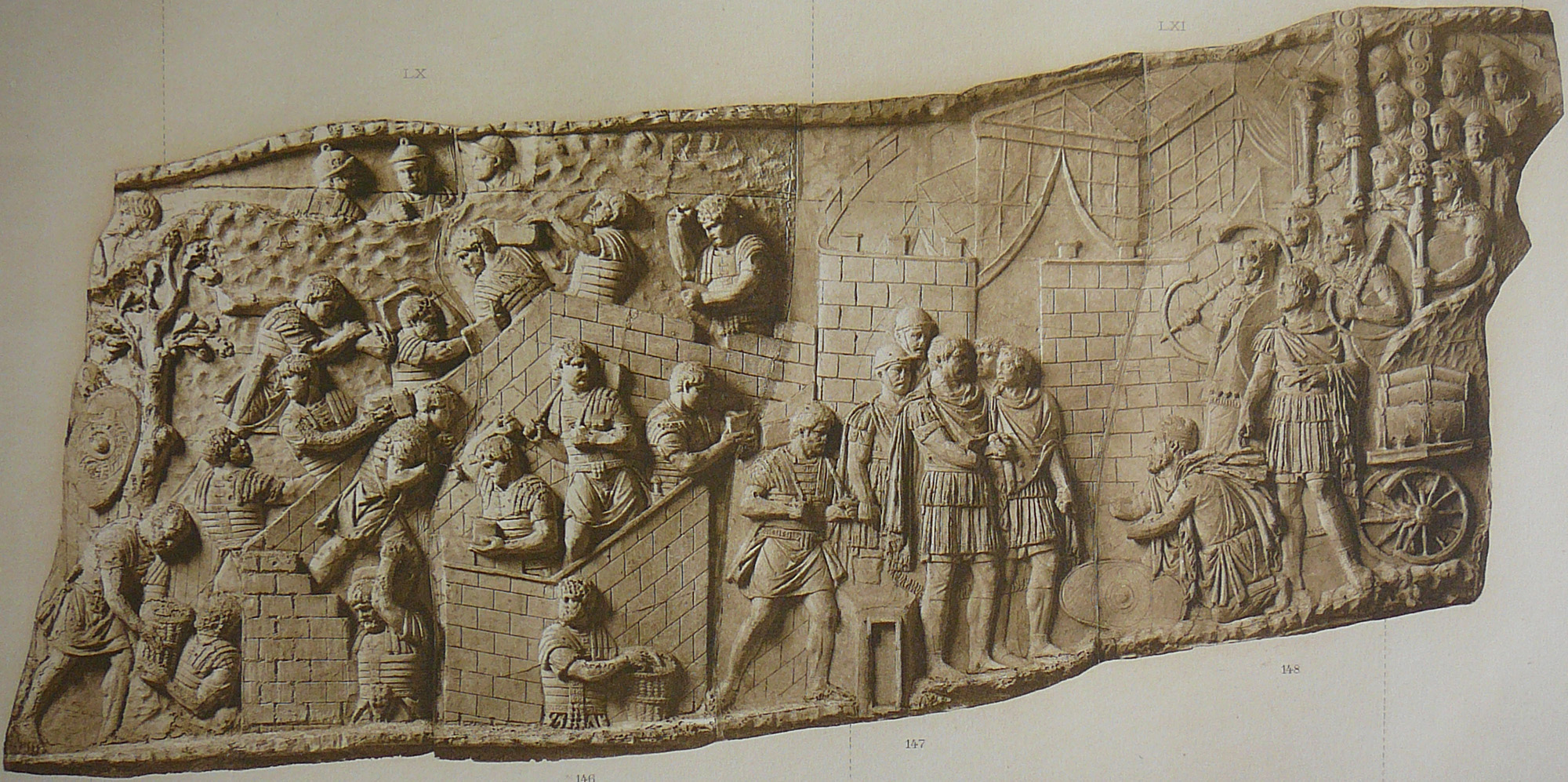
Relief panel from Trajan's Column in Rome, showing the building of a fort and the reception of a Dacian embassy

Through his military reforms, which included consolidating or disbanding units of questionable loyalty, Augustus regularized the legion. A legion was organized into ten cohorts, each of which comprised six centuries, with a century further made up of ten squads (contubernia); the exact size of the Imperial legion, which was likely determined by logistics, has been estimated to range from 4,800 to 5,280. After Germanic tribes wiped out three legions in the Battle of the Teutoburg Forest in 9 AD, the number of legions was increased from 25 to around 30. The army had about 300,000 soldiers in the 1st century, and under 400,000 in the 2nd, "significantly smaller" than the collective armed forces of the conquered territories. No more than 2% of adult males living in the Empire served in the Imperial army. Augustus also created the Praetorian Guard: nine cohorts, ostensibly to maintain the public peace, which were garrisoned in Italy. Better paid than the legionaries, the Praetorians served only sixteen years.

The auxilia were recruited from among the non-citizens. Organized in smaller units of roughly cohort strength, they were paid less than the legionaries, and after 25 years of service were rewarded with Roman citizenship, also extended to their sons. According to Tacitus there were roughly as many auxiliaries as there were legionaries—thus, around 125,000 men, implying approximately 250 auxiliary regiments. The Roman cavalry of the earliest Empire were primarily from Celtic, Hispanic or Germanic areas. Several aspects of training and equipment derived from the Celts.

The Roman navy not only aided in the supply and transport of the legions but also in the protection of the frontiers along the rivers Rhine and Danube. Another duty was protecting maritime trade against pirates. It patrolled the Mediterranean, parts of the North Atlantic coasts, and the Black Sea. Nevertheless, the army was considered the senior and more prestigious branch.

=== Provincial government ===
An annexed territory became a Roman province in three steps: making a register of cities, taking a census, and surveying the land. Further government recordkeeping included births and deaths, real estate transactions, taxes, and juridical proceedings. (Note: "Most government records that are preserved come from Roman Egypt, where the climate preserved the papyri.") In the 1st and 2nd centuries, the central government sent out around 160 officials annually to govern outside Italy. Among these officials were the Roman governors: magistrates elected at Rome who in the name of the Roman people governed senatorial provinces; or governors, usually of equestrian rank, who held their imperium on behalf of the emperor in imperial provinces, most notably Roman Egypt. (Note: "The exclusion of Egypt from the senatorial provinces dates to the rise of Octavian before he became Augustus: Egypt had been the stronghold of his last opposition, Mark Antony and his ally Cleopatra.") A governor had to make himself accessible to the people he governed, but he could delegate various duties. His staff, however, was minimal: his official attendants (apparitores), including lictors, heralds, messengers, scribes, and bodyguards; legates, both civil and military, usually of equestrian rank; and friends who accompanied him unofficially.

Other officials were appointed as supervisors of government finances. Separating fiscal responsibility from justice and administration was a reform of the Imperial era, to avoid provincial governors and tax farmers exploiting local populations for personal gain. Equestrian procurators, whose authority was originally "extra-judicial and extra-constitutional", managed both state-owned property and the personal property of the emperor (res privata). Because Roman government officials were few, a provincial who needed help with a legal dispute or criminal case might seek out any Roman perceived to have some official capacity.

In the High Empire, Italy was legally distinguished from the provinces, and along with some favored provincial communities, enjoyed immunity from the property tax and poll tax. However, under the Emperor Diocletian, Italy lost these privileges and was subdivided into provinces.

=== Law ===
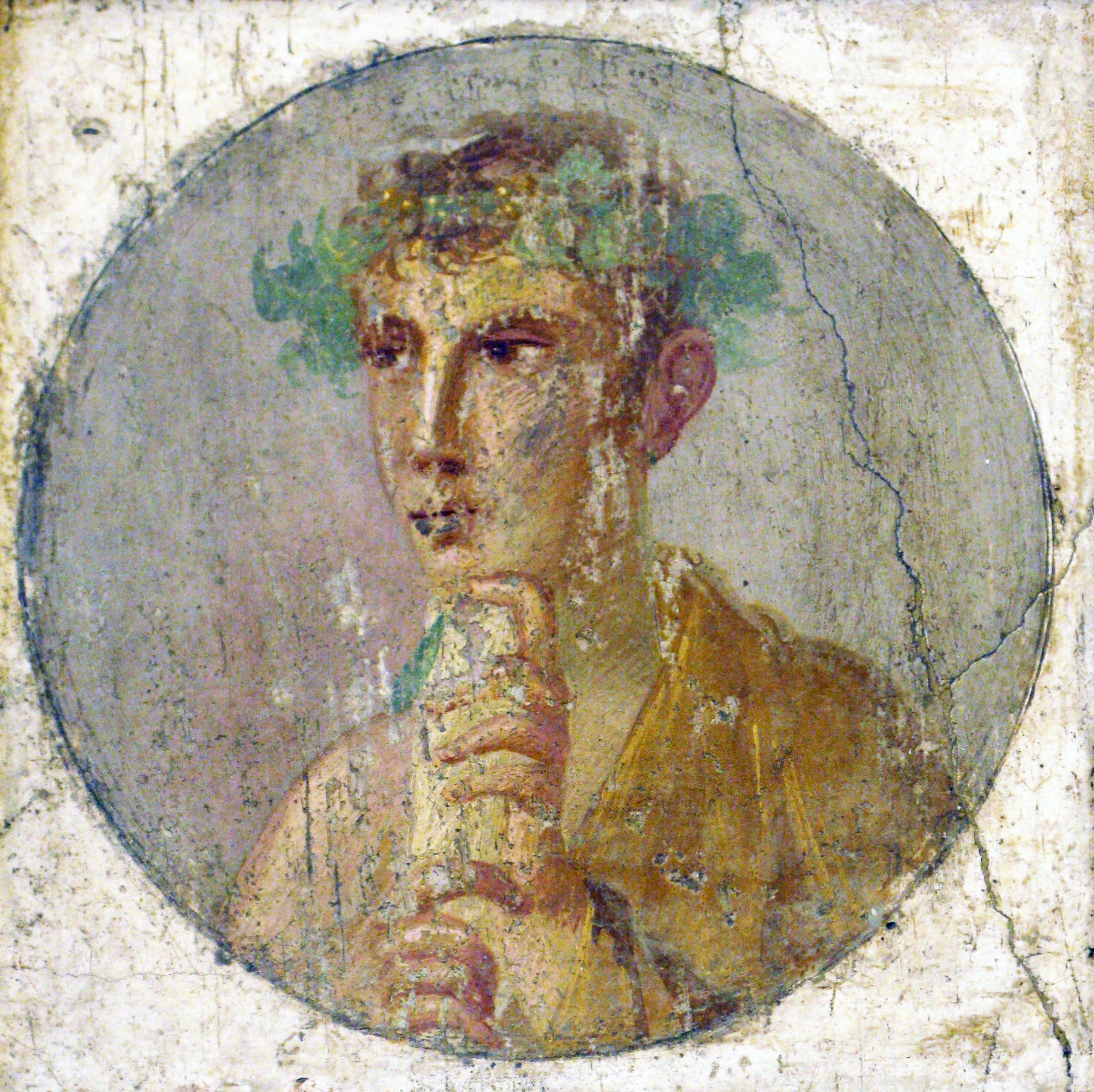
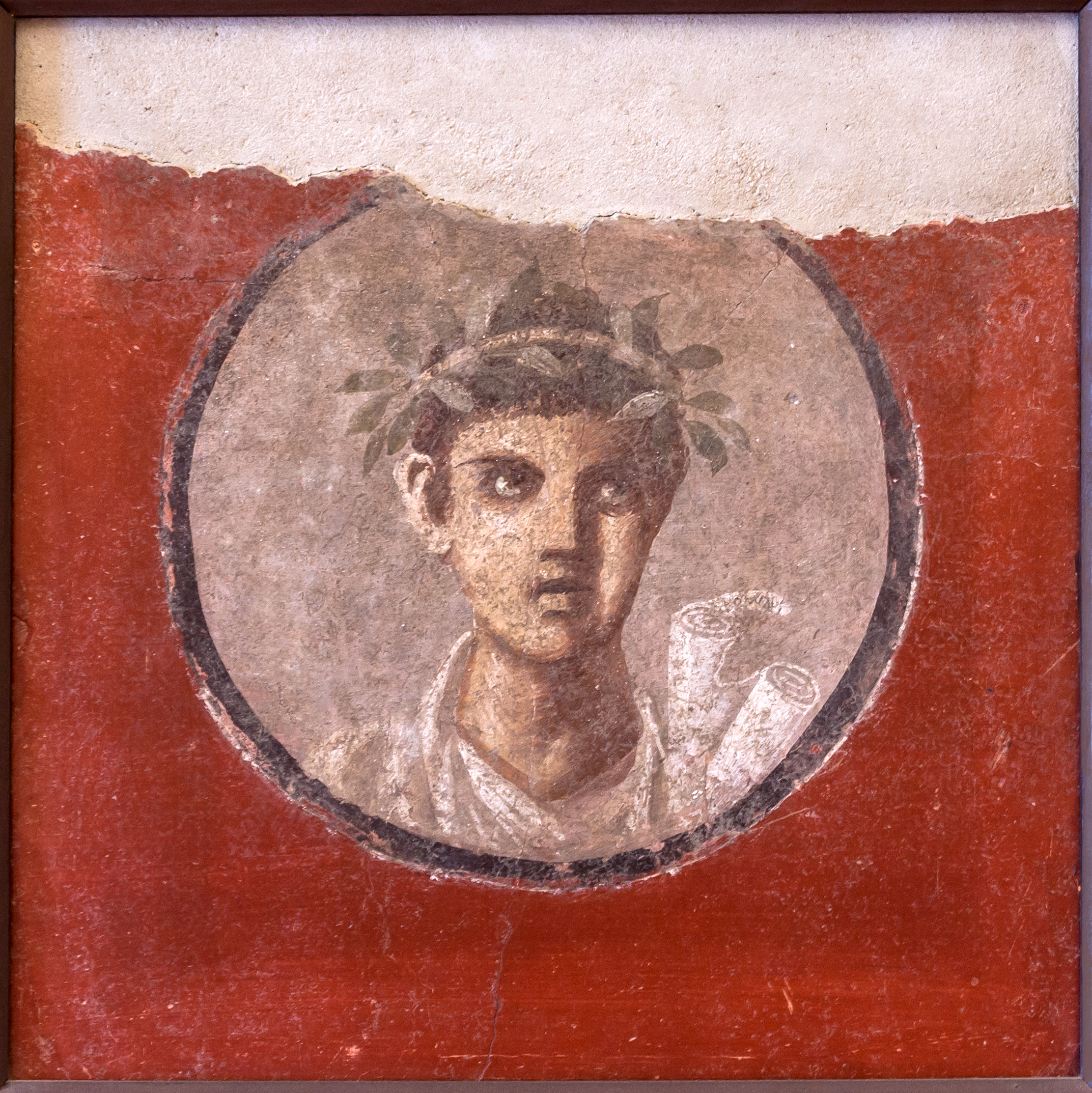
Roman portraiture frescos from Pompeii, 1st century AD, depicting two different men wearing laurel wreaths, one holding the rotulus (blondish figure, left), the other a volumen (brunet figure, right), both made of papyrus

Roman courts held original jurisdiction over cases involving Roman citizens throughout the empire, but there were too few judicial functionaries to impose Roman law uniformly in the provinces. Most parts of the Eastern Empire already had well-established law codes and juridical procedures. Generally, it was Roman policy to respect the mos regionis ("regional tradition" or "law of the land") and to regard local laws as a source of legal precedent and social stability. The compatibility of Roman and local law was thought to reflect an underlying ius gentium, the "law of nations" or international law regarded as common and customary. If provincial law conflicted with Roman law or custom, Roman courts heard appeals, and the emperor held final decision-making authority. (Note: This practice was established in the Republic; see for instance the case of Contrebian water rights heard by G. Valerius Flaccus as governor of Hispania in the 90s–80s BC.)

In the West, law had been administered on a highly localized or tribal basis, and private property rights may have been a novelty of the Roman era, particularly among Celts. Roman law facilitated the acquisition of wealth by a pro-Roman elite. The extension of universal citizenship to all free inhabitants of the Empire in 212 required the uniform application of Roman law, replacing local law codes that had applied to non-citizens. Diocletian's efforts to stabilize the Empire after the Crisis of the Third Century included two major compilations of law in four years, the Codex Gregorianus and the Codex Hermogenianus, to guide provincial administrators in setting consistent legal standards.

The pervasiveness of Roman law throughout Western Europe enormously influenced the Western legal tradition, reflected by continued use of Latin legal terminology in modern law.

=== Taxation ===
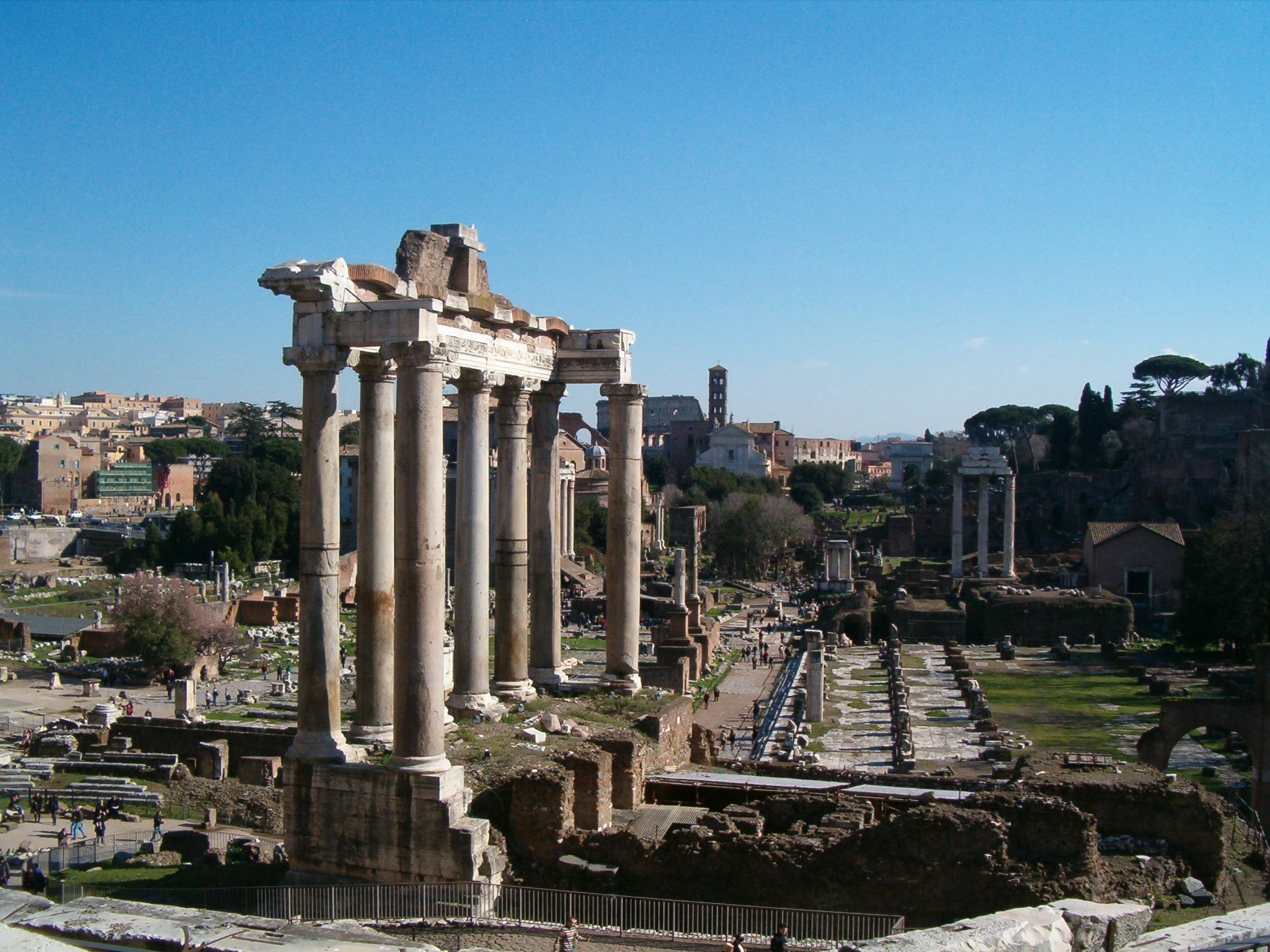
The Temple of Saturn, a religious monument that housed the treasury in ancient Rome

Taxation under the Empire amounted to about 5% of its gross product. The typical tax rate for individuals ranged from 2 to 5%. The tax code was "bewildering" in its complicated system of direct and indirect taxes, some paid in cash and some in kind. Taxes might be specific to a province, or kinds of properties such as fisheries; they might be temporary. Tax collection was justified by the need to maintain the military, and taxpayers sometimes got a refund if the army captured a surplus of booty. In-kind taxes were accepted from less-monetized areas, particularly those who could supply grain or goods to army camps.

The primary source of direct tax revenue was individuals, who paid a poll tax and a tax on their land, construed as a tax on its produce or productive capacity. Tax obligations were determined by the census: each head of household provided a headcount of his household, as well as an accounting of his property. A major source of indirect-tax revenue was the portoria, customs and tolls on trade, including among provinces. Towards the end of his reign, Augustus instituted a 4% tax on the sale of slaves, which Nero shifted from the purchaser to the dealers, who responded by raising their prices. An owner who manumitted a slave paid a "freedom tax", calculated at 5% of value. (Note: This was the vicesima libertatis, "the twentieth for freedom") An inheritance tax of 5% was assessed when Roman citizens above a certain net worth left property to anyone outside their immediate family. Revenues from the estate tax and from an auction tax went towards the veterans' pension fund (aerarium militare).

Low taxes helped the Roman aristocracy increase their wealth, which equalled or exceeded the revenues of the central government. An emperor sometimes replenished his treasury by confiscating the estates of the "super-rich", but in the later period, the resistance of the wealthy to paying taxes was one of the factors contributing to the collapse of the Empire.

== Economy ==
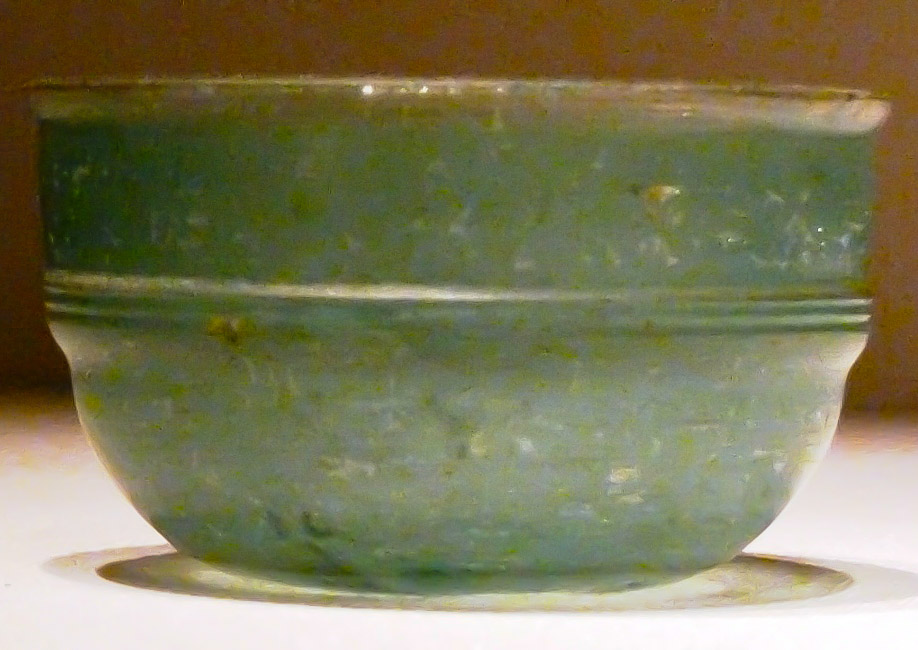
A green Roman glass cup unearthed from an Eastern Han dynasty (25–220 AD) tomb in Guangxi, China

The Empire is best thought of as a network of regional economies, based on a form of "political capitalism" in which the state regulated commerce to assure its own revenues. Economic growth, though not comparable to modern economies, was greater than that of most other societies prior to industrialization. Territorial conquests permitted a large-scale reorganization of land use that resulted in agricultural surplus and specialization, particularly in north Africa. Some cities were known for particular industries. The scale of urban building indicates a significant construction industry. Papyri preserve complex accounting methods that suggest elements of economic rationalism, and the Empire was highly monetized. Although the means of communication and transport were limited in antiquity, transportation in the 1st and 2nd centuries expanded greatly, and trade routes connected regional economies. The supply contracts for the army drew on local suppliers near the base (castrum), throughout the province, and across provincial borders. Economic historians vary in their calculations of the gross domestic product during the Principate. In the sample years of 14, 100, and 150 AD, estimates of per capita GDP range from 166 to 380 HS. The GDP per capita of Italy is estimated as 40 to 66% higher than in the rest of the Empire, due to tax transfers from the provinces and the concentration of elite income.

Economic dynamism resulted in social mobility. Although aristocratic values permeated traditional elite society, wealth requirements for rank indicate a strong tendency towards plutocracy. Prestige could be obtained through investing one's wealth in grand estates or townhouses, luxury items, public entertainments, funerary monuments, and religious dedications. Guilds (collegia) and corporations (corpora) provided support for individuals to succeed through networking. "There can be little doubt that the lower classes of ... provincial towns of the Roman Empire enjoyed a high standard of living not equaled again in Western Europe until the 19th century". Households in the top 1.5% of income distribution captured about 20% of income. The "vast majority" produced more than half of the total income, but lived near subsistence.

=== Currency and banking ===
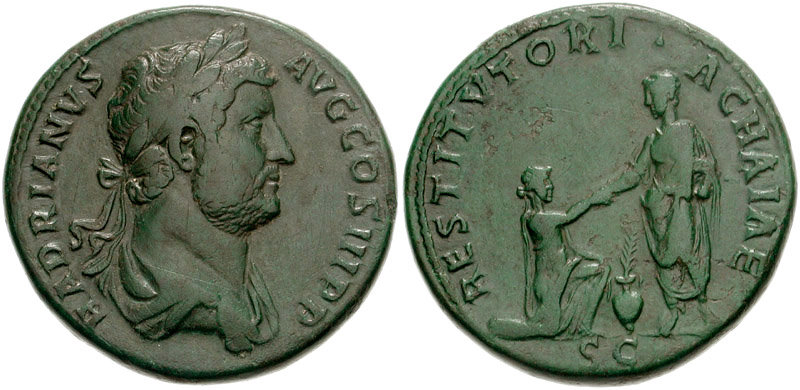
Sestertius issued under Hadrian c. 134–138 AD

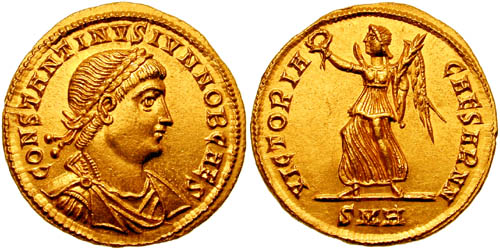
Solidus issued in the name of Constantine II as caesar by Constantine the Great, depicting Victoria on the reverse, one of the last deities to commonly appear on Roman coins, which gradually transformed into an angel under Christian rule

The early Empire was monetized to a near-universal extent, using money as a way to express prices and debts. The sestertius (English "sesterces", symbolized as HS) was the basic unit of reckoning value into the 4th century, though the silver denarius, worth four sesterces, was also used beginning in the Severan dynasty. The smallest coin commonly circulated was the bronze as, one-tenth denarius. Bullion and ingots seem not to have counted as pecunia ("money") and were used only on the frontiers. Romans in the first and second centuries counted coins, rather than weighing them—an indication that the coin was valued on its face. This tendency towards fiat money led to the debasement of Roman coinage in the later Empire. The standardization of money throughout the Empire promoted trade and market integration. The high amount of metal coinage in circulation increased the money supply for trading or saving.

Rome had no central bank, and regulation of the banking system was minimal. Banks of classical antiquity typically kept less in reserves than the full total of customers' deposits. A typical bank had fairly limited capital, and often only one principal. Seneca assumes that anyone involved in Roman commerce needs access to credit. A professional deposit banker received and held deposits for a fixed or indefinite term, and lent money to third parties. The senatorial elite were involved heavily in private lending, both as creditors and borrowers. The holder of a debt could use it as a means of payment by transferring it to another party, without cash changing hands. Although it has sometimes been thought that ancient Rome lacked documentary transactions, the system of banks throughout the Empire permitted the exchange of large sums without physically transferring coins, in part because of the risks of moving large amounts of cash. Only one serious credit shortage is known to have occurred in the early Empire, in 33 AD; generally, available capital exceeded the amount needed by borrowers. The central government itself did not borrow money, and without public debt had to fund deficits from cash reserves.

Emperors of the Antonine and Severan dynasties debased the currency, particularly the denarius, under the pressures of meeting military payrolls. Sudden inflation under Commodus damaged the credit market. In the mid-200s, the supply of specie contracted sharply. Conditions during the Crisis of the Third Century—such as reductions in long-distance trade, disruption of mining operations, and the physical transfer of gold coinage outside the empire by invading enemies—greatly diminished the money supply and the banking sector. Although Roman coinage had long been fiat money or fiduciary currency, general economic anxieties came to a head under Aurelian, and bankers lost confidence in coins. Despite Diocletian's introduction of the gold solidus and monetary reforms, the credit market of the Empire never recovered its former robustness.

=== Mining and metallurgy ===
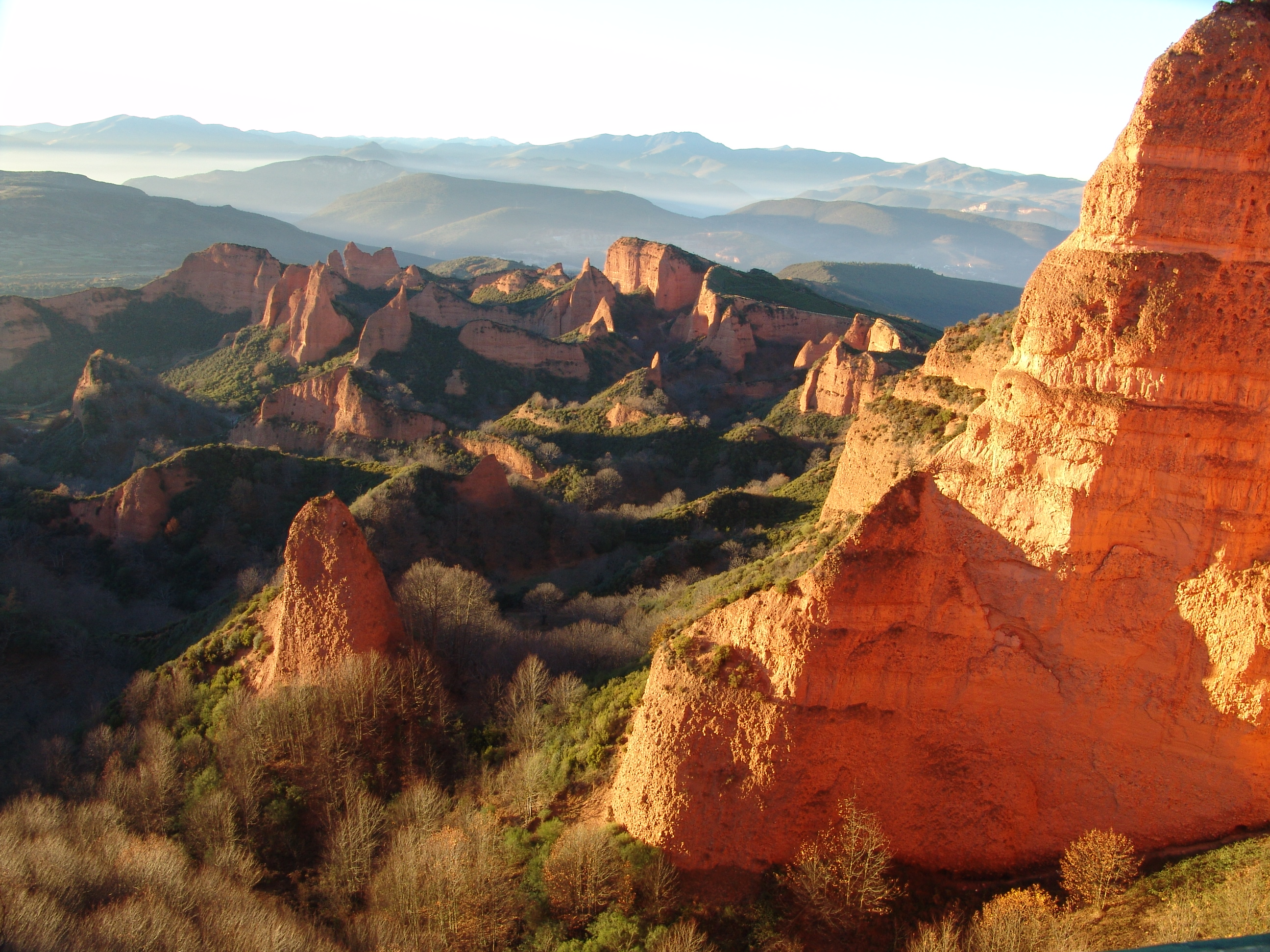
Landscape resulting from the ruina montium mining technique at Las Médulas, Spain, one of the most important gold mines in the Roman Empire

The main mining regions of the Empire were the Iberian Peninsula (silver, copper, lead, iron and gold); Gaul (gold, silver, iron); Britain (mainly iron, lead, tin), the Danubian provinces (gold, iron); Macedonia and Thrace (gold, silver); and Asia Minor (gold, silver, iron, tin). Intensive large-scale mining—of alluvial deposits, and by means of open-cast mining and underground mining—took place from the reign of Augustus up to the early 3rd century, when the instability of the Empire disrupted production.

Hydraulic mining allowed base and precious metals to be extracted on a proto-industrial scale. The total annual iron output is estimated at 82,500 tonnes. (Note: Healy (1978) assumes a productive capacity of c. 1.5 kg per capita.) Copper and lead production levels were unmatched until the Industrial Revolution. At its peak around the mid-2nd century, the Roman silver stock is estimated at 10,000 t, five to ten times larger than the combined silver mass of medieval Europe and the Caliphate around 800 AD. As an indication of the scale of Roman metal production, lead pollution in the Greenland ice sheet quadrupled over prehistoric levels during the Imperial era and dropped thereafter.

=== Transportation and communication ===
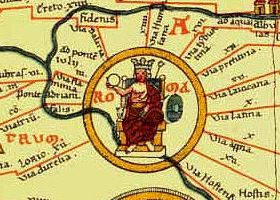
The Tabula Peutingeriana (Latin for "The Peutinger Map") an Itinerarium, often assumed to be based on the Roman cursus publicus

The Empire completely encircled the Mediterranean, which they called "our sea" (Mare Nostrum). Roman sailing vessels navigated the Mediterranean as well as major rivers. Transport by water was preferred where possible, as moving commodities by land was more difficult. Vehicles, wheels, and ships indicate the existence of a great number of skilled woodworkers.

Land transport utilized the advanced system of Roman roads, called "viae". These roads were primarily built for military purposes, but also served commercial ends. The in-kind taxes paid by communities included the provision of personnel, animals, or vehicles for the cursus publicus, the state mail and transport service established by Augustus. Relay stations were located along the roads every seven to twelve Roman miles, and tended to grow into villages or trading posts. A mansio (plural mansiones) was a privately run service station franchised by the imperial bureaucracy for the cursus publicus. The distance between mansiones was determined by how far a wagon could travel in a day. Carts were usually pulled by mules, travelling about 4 mph.

=== Trade and commodities ===
Roman provinces traded among themselves, but trade extended outside the frontiers to regions as far away as China and India. Chinese trade was mostly conducted overland through middlemen along the Silk Road; Indian trade also occurred by sea from Egyptian ports. The main commodity was grain. Also traded were olive oil, foodstuffs, garum (fish sauce), slaves, ore and manufactured metal objects, fibres and textiles, timber, pottery, glassware, marble, papyrus, spices and materia medica, ivory, pearls, and gemstones. Though most provinces could produce wine, regional varietals were desirable and wine was a central trade good.

=== Labour and occupations ===
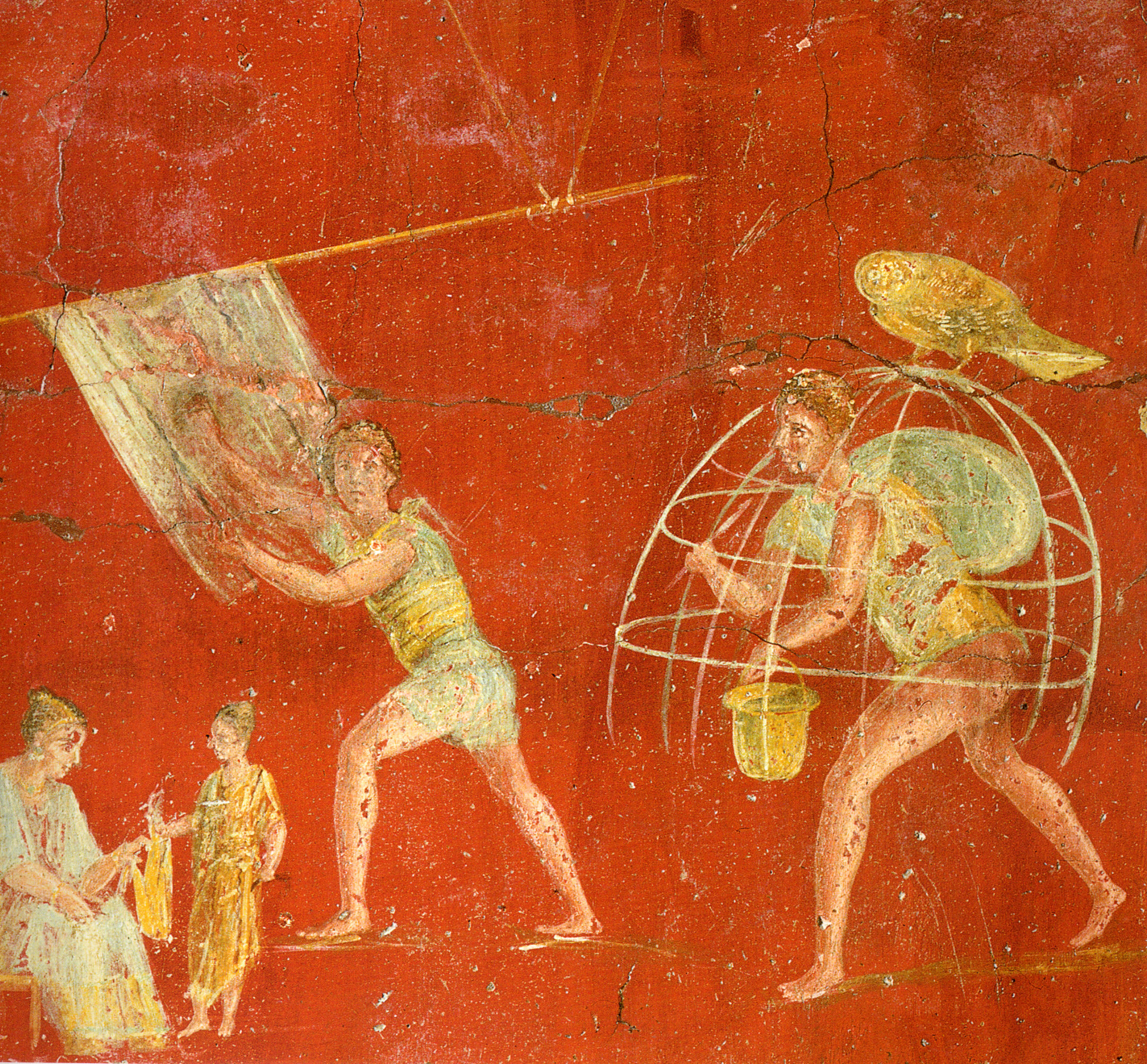
Workers at a cloth-processing shop, in a painting from the fullonica of Veranius Hypsaeus in Pompeii

Inscriptions record 268 different occupations in Rome and 85 in Pompeii. Professional associations or trade guilds (collegia) are attested for a wide range of occupations, some quite specialized.

Work performed by slaves falls into five general categories: domestic, with epitaphs recording at least 55 different household jobs; imperial or public service; urban crafts and services; agriculture; and mining. Convicts provided much of the labour in the mines or quarries, where conditions were notoriously brutal. In practice, there was little division of labour between slave and free, and most workers were illiterate and without special skills. The greatest number of common labourers were employed in agriculture: in Italian industrial farming (latifundia), these may have been mostly slaves, but elsewhere slave farm labour was probably less important.

Textile and clothing production was a major source of employment. Both textiles and finished garments were traded and products were often named for peoples or towns, like a fashion "label". Better ready-to-wear was exported by local businessmen (negotiatores or mercatores). Finished garments might be retailed by their sales agents, by vestiarii (clothing dealers), or peddled by itinerant merchants. The fullers (fullones) and dye workers (coloratores) had their own guilds. Centonarii were guild workers who specialized in textile production and the recycling of old clothes into pieced goods. (Note: The college of centonarii is an elusive topic in scholarship, since they are also widely attested as urban firefighters. Historian Jinyu Liu sees them as "primarily tradesmen and/or manufacturers engaged in the production and distribution of low- or medium-quality woolen textiles and clothing, including felt and its products".)

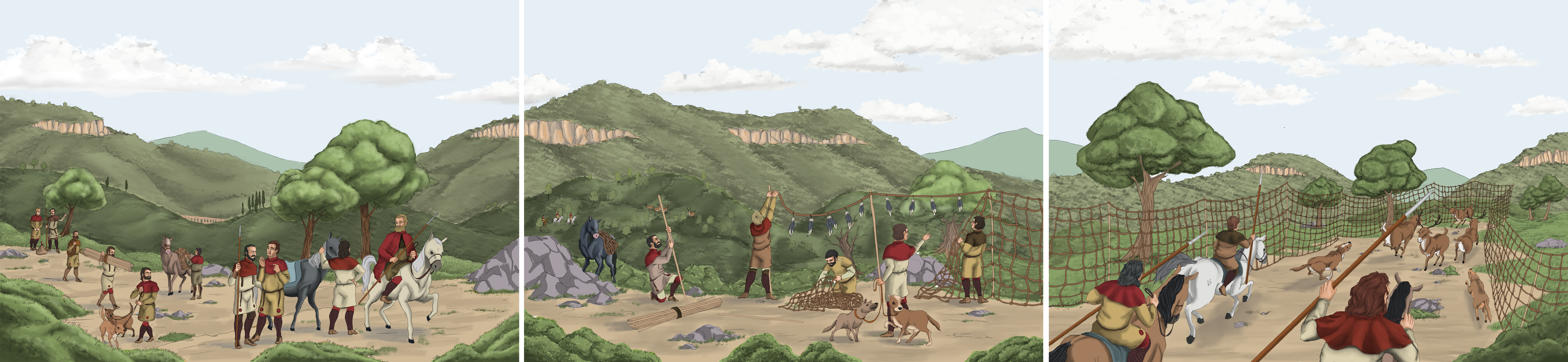
Recreation of a deer hunt inspired by hunting scenes represented in Roman art

== Architecture and engineering ==
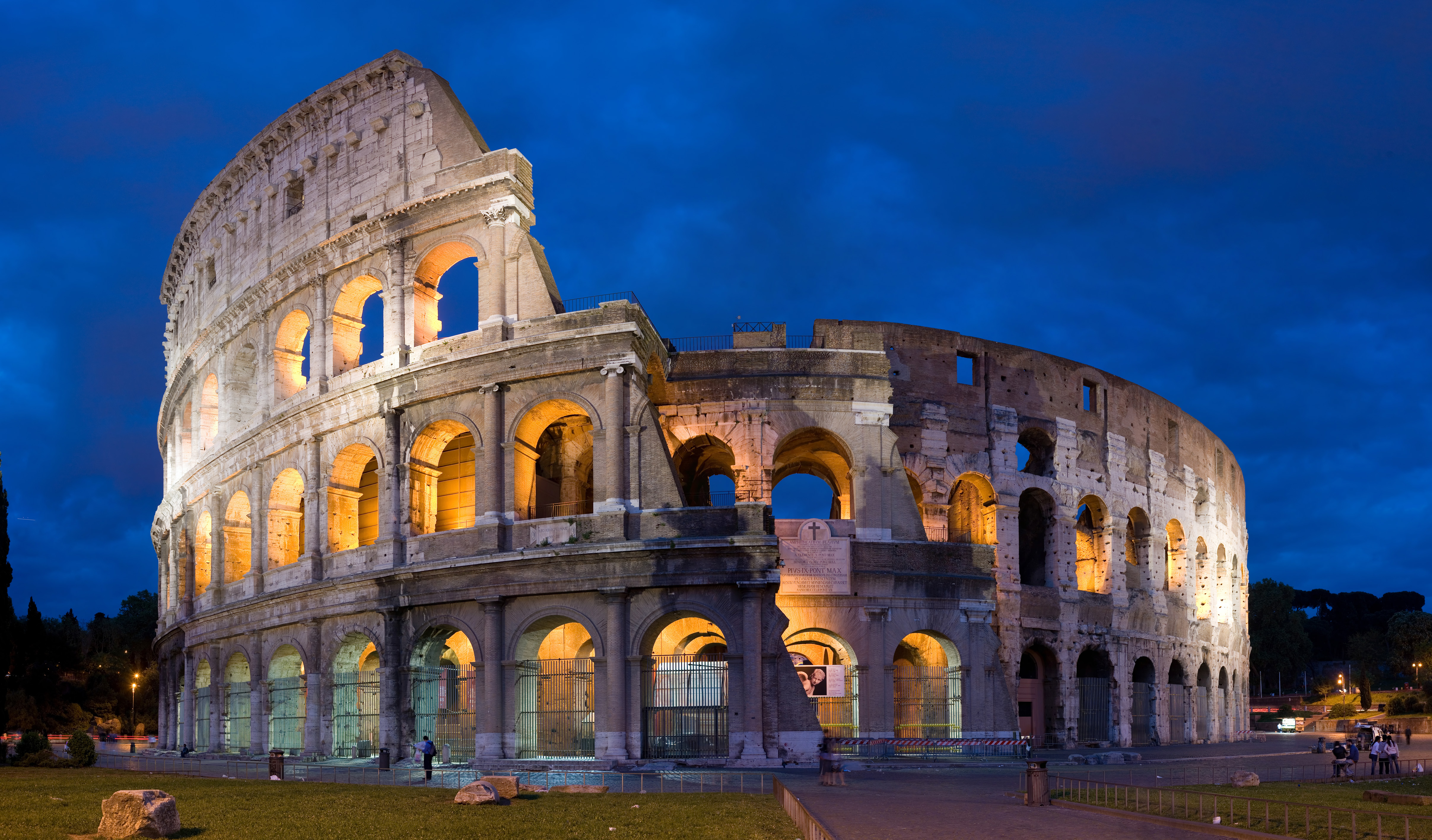
The Flavian Amphitheatre, more commonly known as the Colosseum

The chief Roman contributions to architecture were the arch, vault, and dome. Some Roman structures still stand today, due in part to sophisticated methods of making cements and concrete. Roman temples developed Etruscan and Greek forms, with some distinctive elements. Roman roads are considered the most advanced built until the early 19th century.

Roman bridges were among the first large and lasting bridges, built from stone (and in most cases concrete) with the arch as the basic structure. The largest Roman bridge was Trajan's bridge over the lower Danube, constructed by Apollodorus of Damascus, which remained for over a millennium the longest bridge to have been built. The Romans built many dams and reservoirs for water collection, such as the Subiaco Dams, two of which fed the Anio Novus, one of the largest aqueducts of Rome.

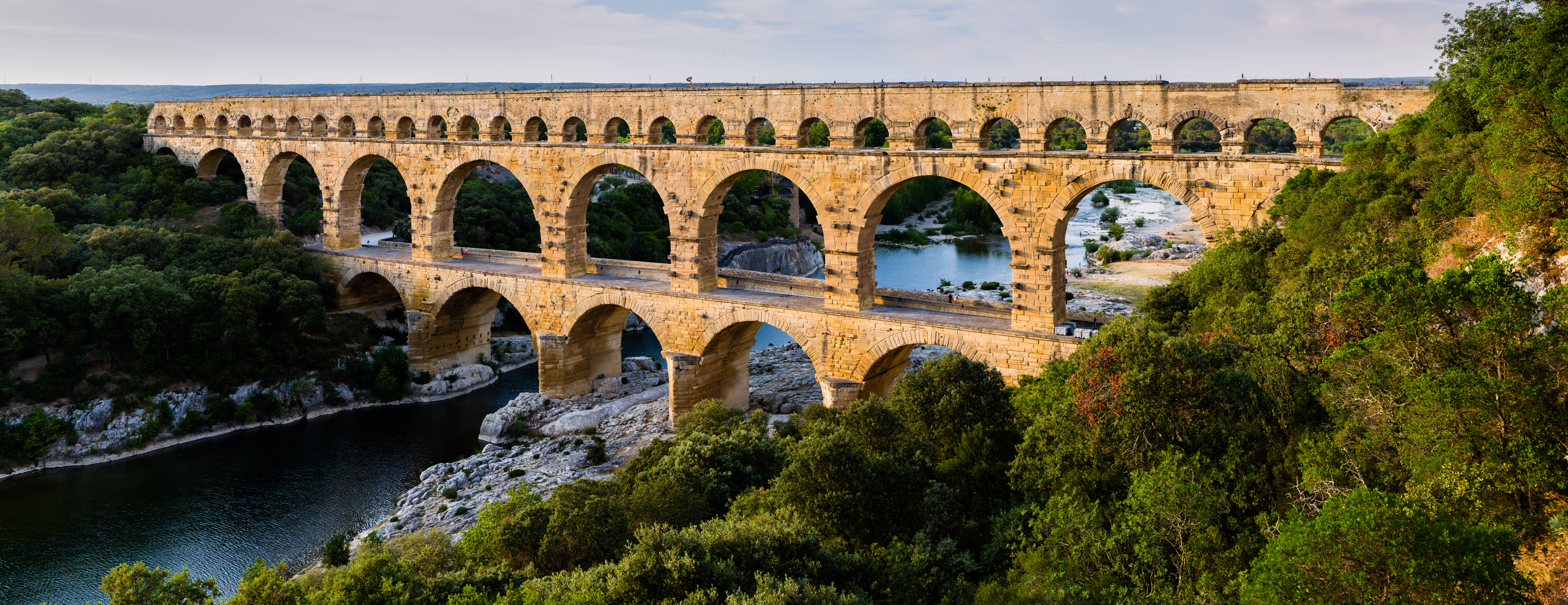
The Pont du Gard aqueduct, which crosses the river Gardon in southern France, is on UNESCO's list of World Heritage Sites.

The Romans constructed numerous aqueducts. De aquaeductu, a treatise by Frontinus, who served as water commissioner, reflects the administrative importance placed on the water supply. Masonry channels carried water along a precise gradient, using gravity alone. It was then collected in tanks and fed through pipes to public fountains, baths, toilets, or industrial sites. The main aqueducts in Rome were the Aqua Claudia and the Aqua Marcia. The complex system built to supply Constantinople had its most distant supply drawn from over 120 km away along a route of more than 336 km. Roman aqueducts were built to remarkably fine tolerance, and to a technological standard not equalled until modern times. The Romans also used aqueducts in their extensive mining operations across the empire.

Insulated glazing (or "double glazing") was used in the construction of public baths. Elite housing in cooler climates might have hypocausts, a form of central heating. The Romans were the first culture to assemble all essential components of the much later steam engine: the crank and connecting rod system, Hero's aeolipile (generating steam power), the cylinder and piston (in metal force pumps), non-return valves (in water pumps), and gearing (in water mills and clocks).

== Daily life ==
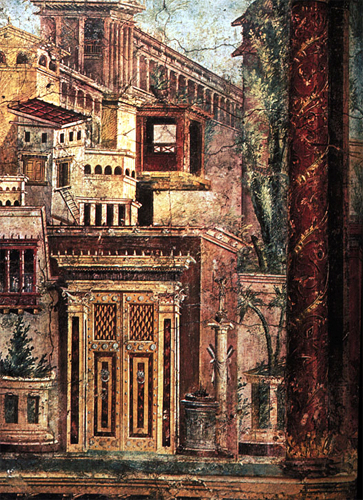
Cityscape from the Villa Boscoreale (60s AD)

=== City and country ===
The city was viewed as fostering civilization by being "properly designed, ordered, and adorned". Augustus undertook a vast building programme in Rome, supported public displays of art that expressed imperial ideology, and reorganized the city into neighbourhoods (vici) administered at the local level with police and firefighting services. A focus of Augustan monumental architecture was the Campus Martius, an open area outside the city centre: the Altar of Augustan Peace (Ara Pacis Augustae) was located there, as was an obelisk imported from Egypt that formed the pointer (gnomon) of a horologium. With its public gardens, the Campus was among the most attractive places in Rome to visit.

City planning and urban lifestyles was influenced by the Greeks early on, and in the Eastern Empire, Roman rule shaped the development of cities that already had a strong Hellenistic character. Cities such as Athens, Aphrodisias, Ephesus and Gerasa tailored city planning and architecture to imperial ideals, while expressing their individual identity and regional preeminence. In areas inhabited by Celtic-speaking peoples, Rome encouraged the development of urban centres with stone temples, forums, monumental fountains, and amphitheatres, often on or near the sites of preexisting walled settlements known as oppida. (Note: Julius Caesar first applied the Latin word oppidum to this type of settlement, and even called Avaricum (Bourges, France), a center of the Bituriges, an urbs, "city". Archaeology indicates that oppida were centers of religion, trade (including import/export), and industrial production, walled for the purposes of defence, but they may not have been inhabited by concentrated populations year-round.) Urbanization in Roman Africa expanded on Greek and Punic coastal cities.

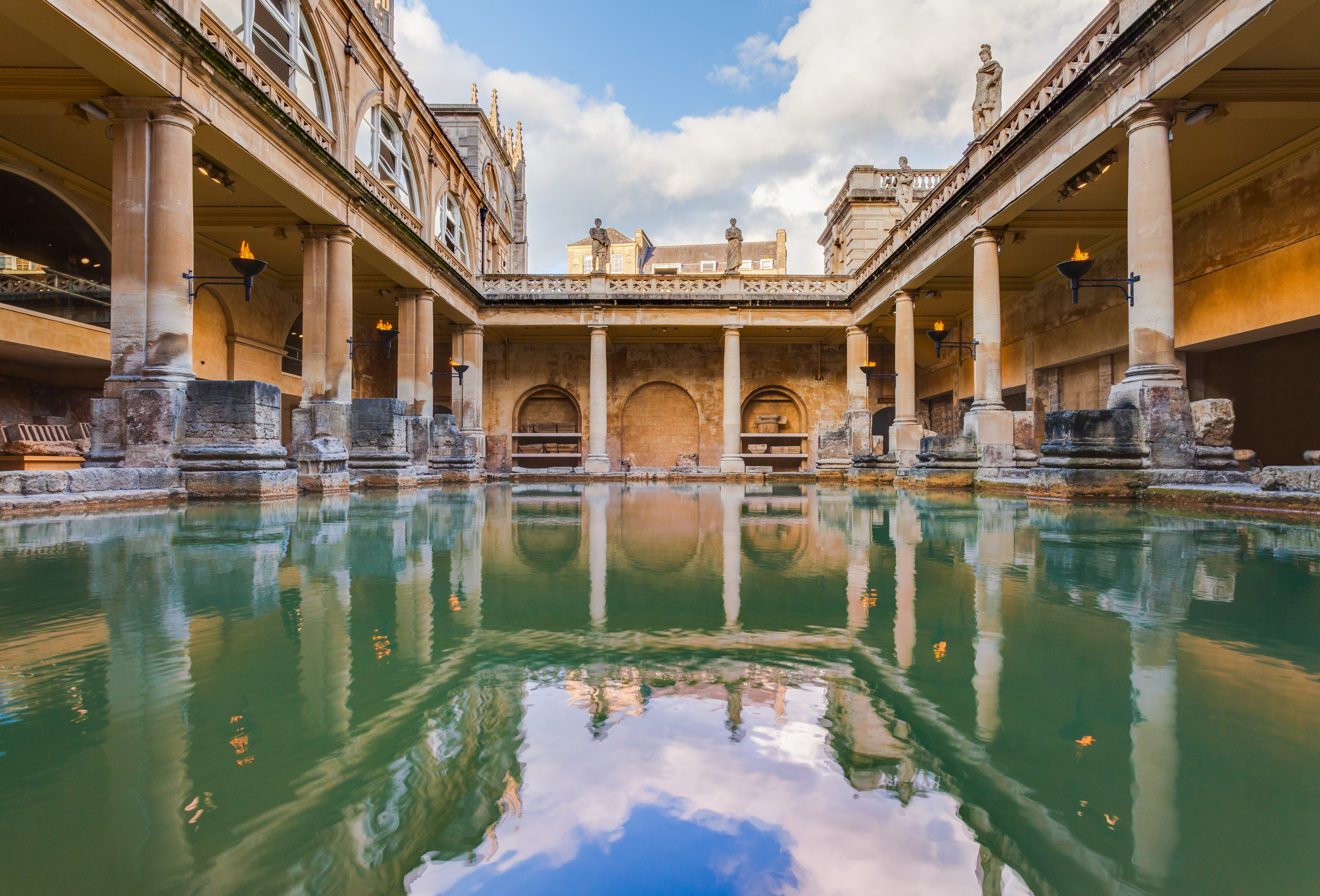
Aquae Sulis in Bath, England: architectural features above the level of the pillar bases are a later reconstruction.

The network of cities (coloniae, municipia, civitates or in Greek terms poleis) was a primary cohesive force during the Pax Romana. Romans of the 1st and 2nd centuries were encouraged to "inculcate the habits of peacetime".. As the classicist Clifford Ando noted:

Most of the cultural appurtenances popularly associated with imperial culture—public cult and its games and civic banquets, competitions for artists, speakers, and athletes, as well as the funding of the great majority of public buildings and public display of art—were financed by private individuals, whose expenditures in this regard helped to justify their economic power and legal and provincial privileges.

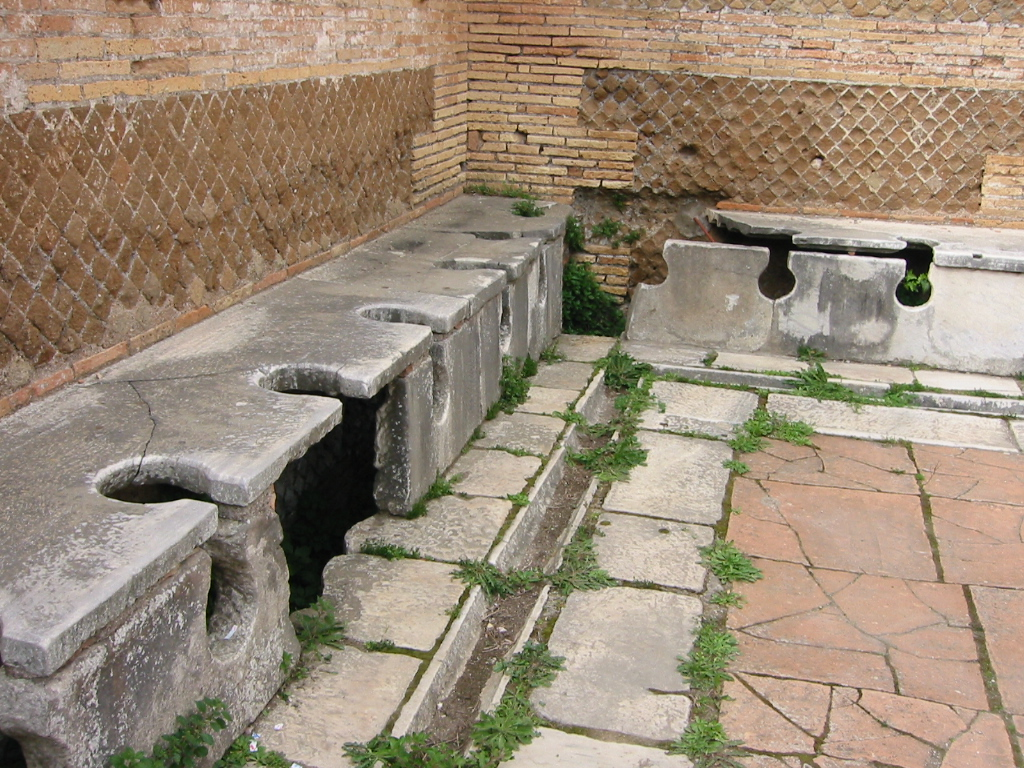
Public toilets (latrinae) from Ostia Antica

In the city of Rome, most people lived in multistory apartment buildings (insulae) that were often squalid firetraps. Public facilities—such as baths (thermae), toilets with running water (latrinae), basins or elaborate fountains (nymphea) delivering fresh water, and large-scale entertainments such as chariot races and gladiator combat—were aimed primarily at the common people.

The public baths served hygienic, social and cultural functions. Bathing was the focus of daily socializing. Roman baths were distinguished by a series of rooms that offered communal bathing in three temperatures, with amenities that might include an exercise room, sauna, exfoliation spa, ball court, or outdoor swimming pool. Baths had hypocaust heating: the floors were suspended over hot-air channels. Public baths were part of urban culture throughout the provinces, but in the late 4th century, individual tubs began to replace communal bathing. Christians were advised to go to the baths only for hygiene.

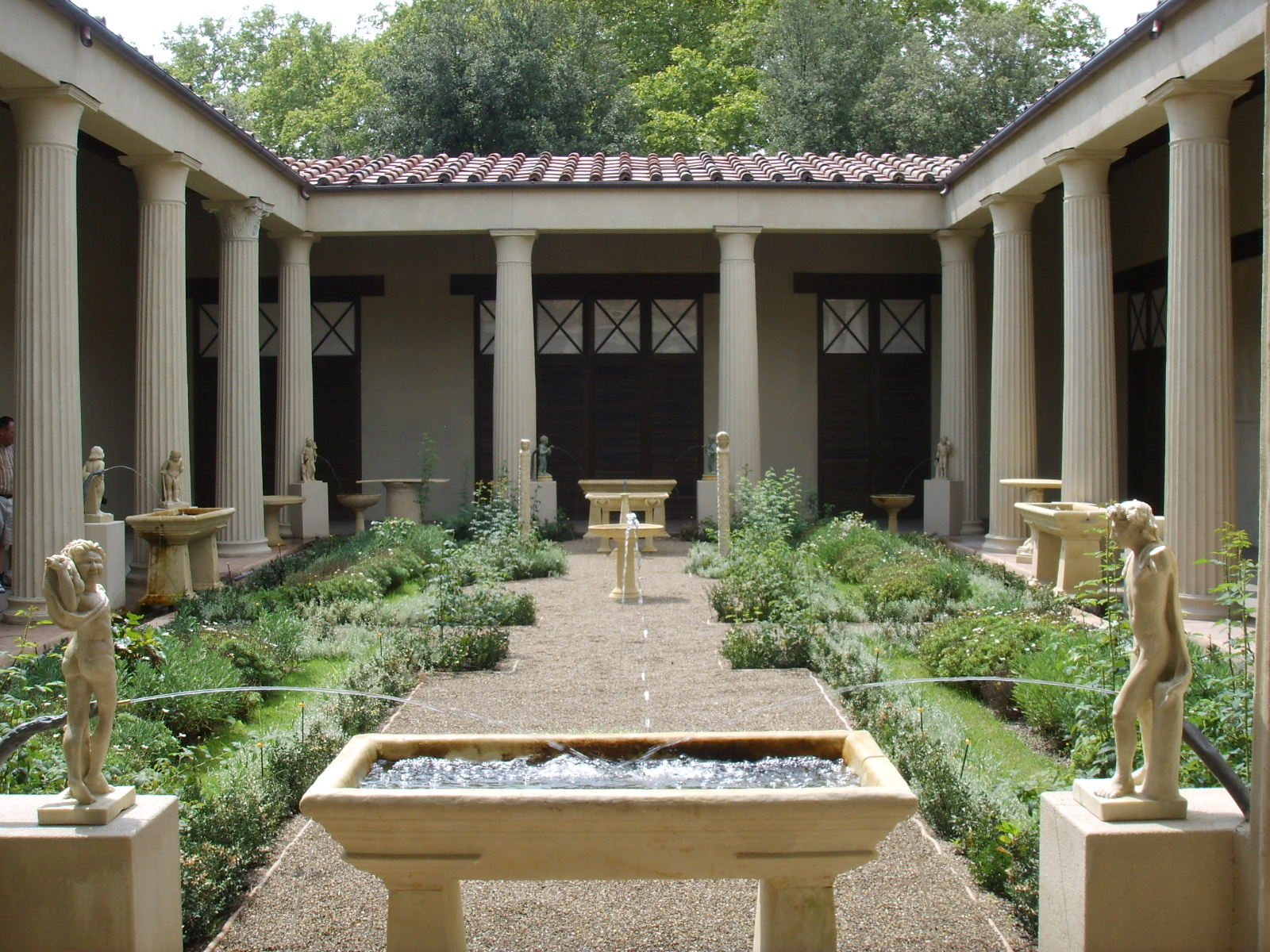
Reconstructed peristyle garden based on the House of the Vettii

Rich families from Rome usually had two or more houses: a townhouse (domus) and at least one luxury home (villa) outside the city. The domus was a privately owned single-family house, and might be furnished with a private bath (balneum), but it was not a place to retreat from public life. Although some neighbourhoods show a higher concentration of such houses, they were not segregated enclaves. The domus was meant to be visible and accessible. The atrium served as a reception hall in which the paterfamilias (head of household) met with clients every morning. It was a centre of family religious rites, containing a shrine and images of family ancestors. The houses were located on busy public roads, and ground-level spaces were often rented out as shops (tabernae). In addition to a kitchen garden—windowboxes might substitute in the insulae—townhouses typically enclosed a peristyle garden.

The villa by contrast was an escape from the city, and in literature represents a lifestyle that balances intellectual and artistic interests (otium) with an appreciation of nature and agriculture. Ideally a villa commanded a view or vista, carefully framed by the architectural design.

Augustus' programme of urban renewal, and the growth of Rome's population to as many as one million, was accompanied by nostalgia for rural life. Poetry idealized the lives of farmers and shepherds. Interior decorating often featured painted gardens, fountains, landscapes, vegetative ornament, and animals, rendered accurately enough to be identified by species. On a more practical level, the central government took an active interest in supporting agriculture. Producing food was the priority of land use. Larger farms (latifundia) achieved an economy of scale that sustained urban life. Small farmers benefited from the development of local markets in towns and trade centres. Agricultural techniques such as crop rotation and selective breeding were disseminated throughout the Empire, and new crops were introduced from one province to another.

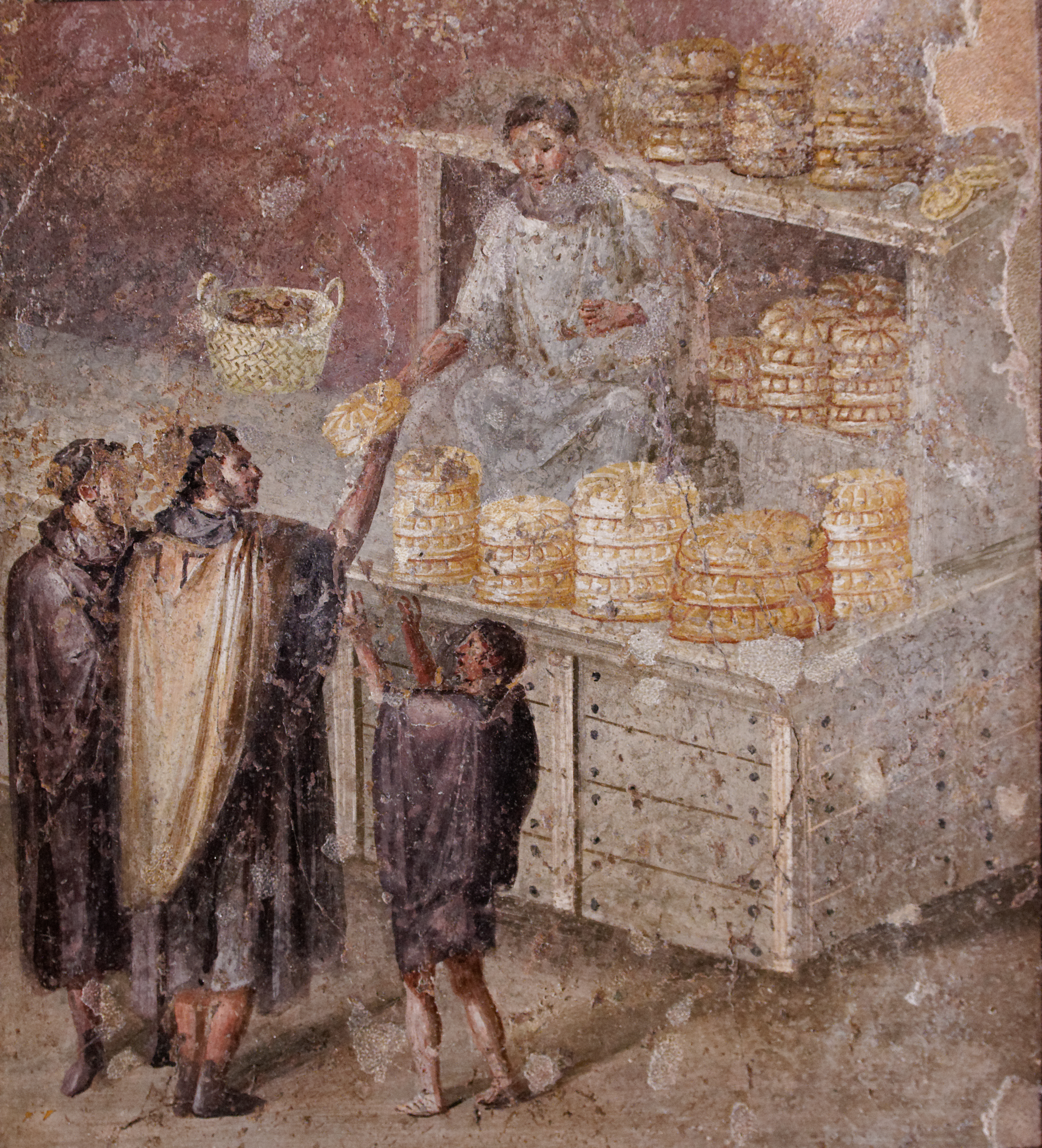
Bread stall, from a Pompeiian wall painting

Maintaining an affordable food supply to the city of Rome had become a major political issue in the late Republic, when the state began to provide a grain dole (Cura Annonae) to citizens who registered for it (about 200,000–250,000 adult males in Rome). (Note: Morris & Scheidel (2009) estimate that the surplus of wheat from the province of Egypt alone could meet and exceed the needs of the city of Rome and the provincial armies.) The dole cost at least 15% of state revenues, but improved living conditions among the lower classes, and subsidized the rich by allowing workers to spend more of their earnings on the wine and olive oil produced on estates. The grain dole also had symbolic value: it affirmed the emperor's position as universal benefactor, and the right of citizens to share in "the fruits of conquest". The annona, public facilities, and spectacular entertainments mitigated the otherwise dreary living conditions of lower-class Romans, and kept social unrest in check. The satirist Juvenal, however, saw "bread and circuses" (panem et circenses) as emblematic of the loss of republican political liberty:

The public has long since cast off its cares; the people that once bestowed commands, consulships, legions and all else, now meddles no more and longs eagerly for just two things — Bread and Games!

=== Health and disease ===
Epidemics were common in the ancient world, and occasional pandemics in the Empire killed millions. The Roman population was unhealthy. About 20 percent—a large percentage by ancient standards—lived in cities, Rome being the largest. The cities were a "demographic sink": the death rate exceeded the birth rate and constant immigration was necessary to maintain the population. Average lifespan is estimated at the mid-twenties, and perhaps more than half of children died before reaching adulthood. Dense urban populations and poor sanitation contributed to disease. Land and sea connections facilitated and sped the transfer of infectious diseases across the empire's territories. The rich were not immune; only two of emperor Marcus Aurelius's fourteen children are known to have reached adulthood.

The importance of a good diet to health was recognized by medical writers such as Galen (2nd century). Views on nutrition were influenced by beliefs like humoral theory. A good indicator of nutrition and disease burden is average height: the average Roman was shorter in stature than the population of pre-Roman Italian societies and medieval Europe.

=== Food and dining ===
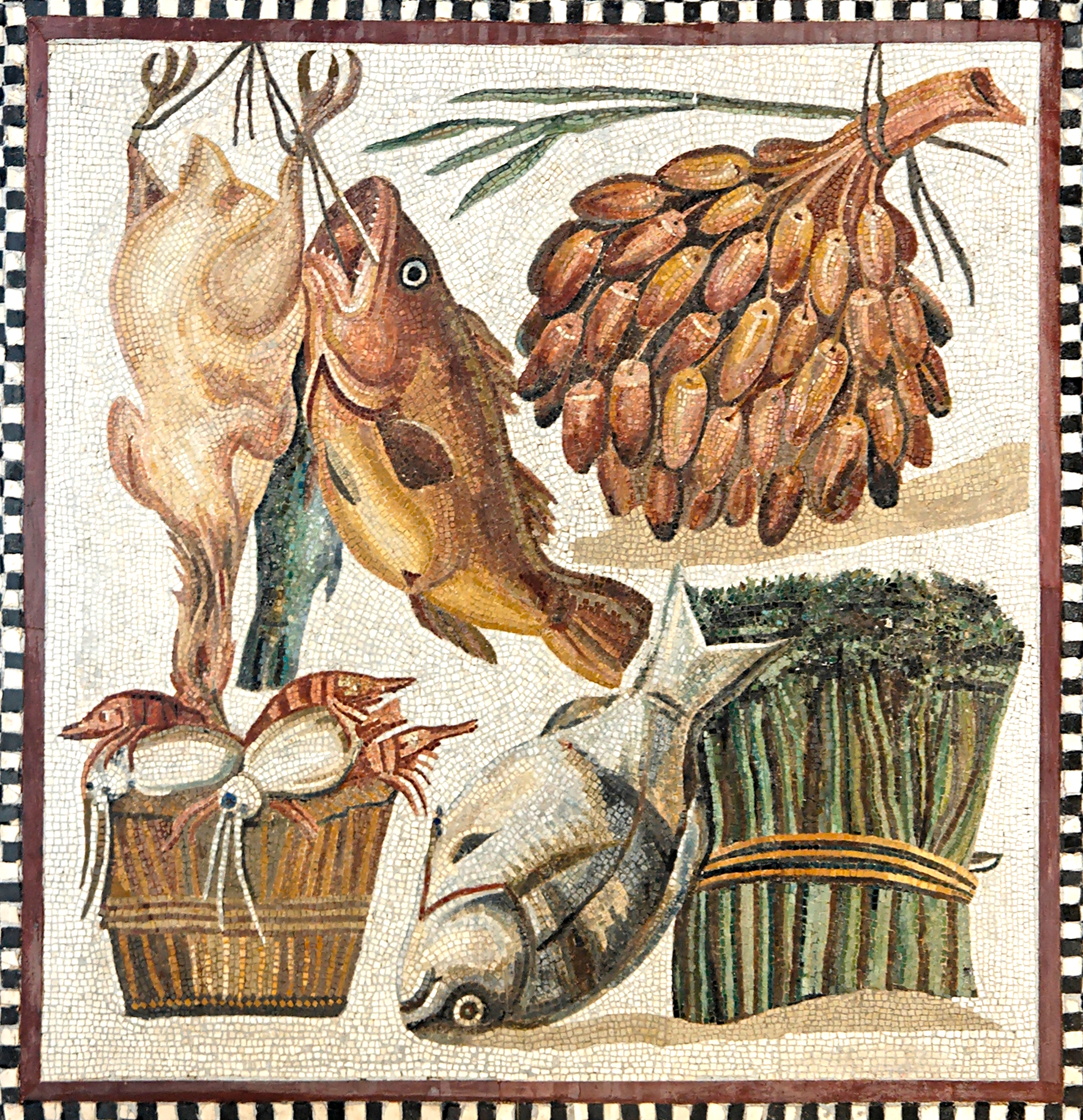
Still life on a 2nd-century Roman mosaic

Most apartments in Rome lacked kitchens, though a charcoal brazier could be used for rudimentary cookery. Prepared food was sold at pubs and bars, inns, and food stalls (tabernae, cauponae, popinae, thermopolia). Carryout and restaurants were for the lower classes; fine dining appeared only at dinner parties in wealthy homes with a chef (archimagirus) and kitchen staff, or banquets hosted by social clubs (collegia).

Most Romans consumed at least 70% of their daily calories in the form of cereals and legumes. Puls (pottage) was considered the food of the Romans, and could be elaborated to produce dishes similar to polenta or risotto. Urban populations and the military preferred bread. By the reign of Aurelian, the state had begun to distribute the annona as a daily ration of bread baked in state factories, and added olive oil, wine, and pork to the dole.

Roman literature focuses on the dining habits of the upper classes, for whom the evening meal (cena) had important social functions. Guests were entertained in a finely decorated dining room (triclinium) furnished with couches. By the late Republic, women dined, reclined, and drank wine along with men. The poet Martial describes a dinner, beginning with the gustatio ("tasting" or "appetizer") salad. The main course was kid, beans, greens, a chicken, and leftover ham, followed by a dessert of fruit and wine. Roman "foodies" indulged in wild game, fowl such as peacock and flamingo, large fish (mullet was especially prized), and shellfish. Luxury ingredients were imported from the far reaches of empire. A book-length collection of Roman recipes is attributed to Apicius, a name for several figures in antiquity that became synonymous with "gourmet".

Refined cuisine could be moralized as a sign of either civilized progress or decadent decline. Most often, because of the importance of landowning in Roman culture, produce—cereals, legumes, vegetables, and fruit—were considered more civilized foods than meat. The Mediterranean staples of bread, wine, and oil were sacralized by Roman Christianity, while Germanic meat consumption became a mark of paganism. Some philosophers and Christians resisted the demands of the body and the pleasures of food, and adopted fasting as an ideal. Food became simpler in general as urban life in the West diminished and trade routes were disrupted; the Church formally discouraged gluttony, and hunting and pastoralism were seen as simple and virtuous.

=== Spectacles ===
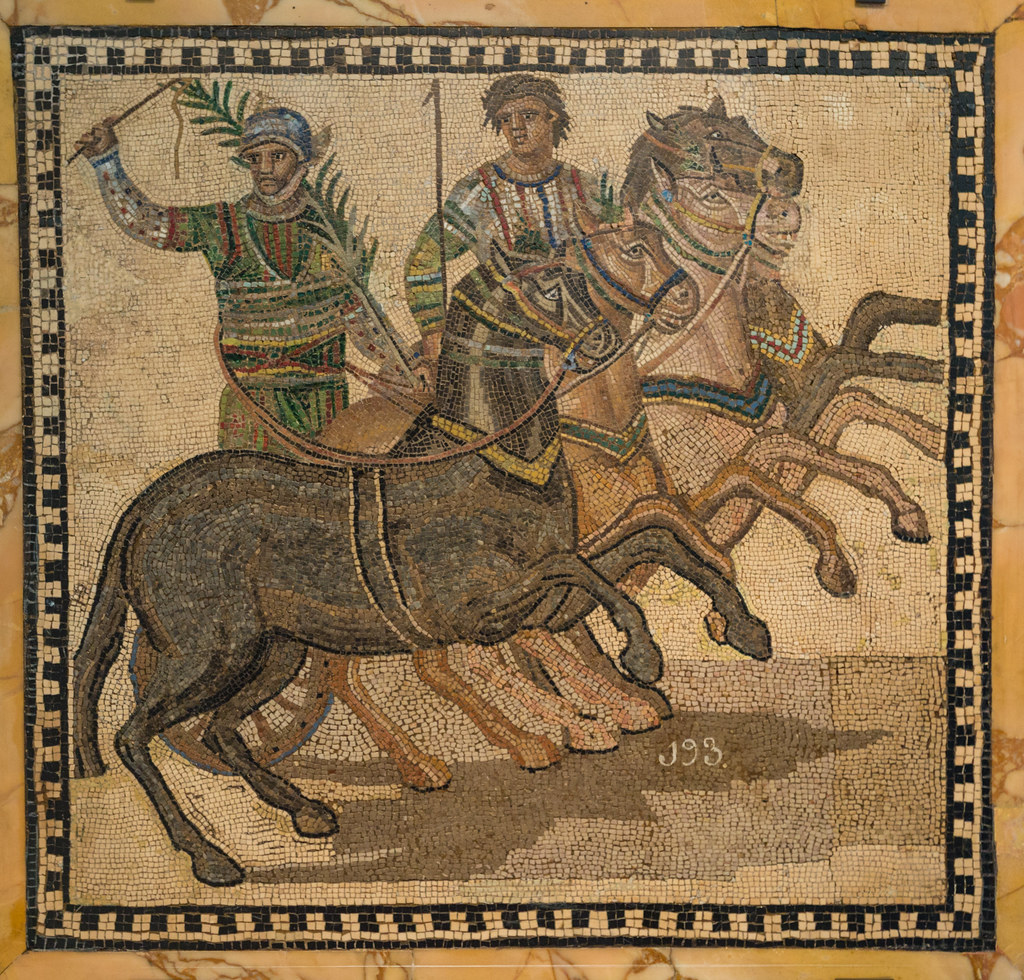
A victor in his four-horse chariot

When Juvenal complained that the Roman people had exchanged their political liberty for "bread and circuses", he was referring to the state-provided grain dole and the circenses, events held in the entertainment venue called a circus. The largest such venue in Rome was the Circus Maximus, the setting of horse races, chariot races, the equestrian Troy Game, staged beast hunts (venationes), athletic contests, gladiator combat, and historical re-enactments. From earliest times, several religious festivals had featured games (ludi), primarily horse and chariot races (ludi circenses). The races retained religious significance in connection with agriculture, initiation, and the cycle of birth and death. (Note: Such as the Consualia and the October Horse sacrifice.)

Under Augustus, public entertainments were presented on 77 days of the year; by the reign of Marcus Aurelius, this had expanded to 135. Circus games were preceded by an elaborate parade (pompa circensis) that ended at the venue. Competitive events were held also in smaller venues such as the amphitheatre, which became the characteristic Roman spectacle venue, and stadium. Greek-style athletics included footraces, boxing, wrestling, and the pancratium. Aquatic displays, such as the mock sea battle (naumachia) and a form of "water ballet", were presented in engineered pools. State-supported theatrical events (ludi scaenici) took place on temple steps or in grand stone theatres, or in the smaller enclosed theatre called an odeon.

Circuses were the largest structure regularly built in the Roman world. The Flavian Amphitheatre, better known as the Colosseum, became the regular arena for blood sports in Rome. Many Roman amphitheatres, circuses and theatres built in cities outside Italy are visible as ruins today. The local ruling elite were responsible for sponsoring spectacles and arena events, which both enhanced their status and drained their resources. The physical arrangement of the amphitheatre represented the order of Roman society: the emperor in his opulent box; senators and equestrians in reserved advantageous seats; women seated at a remove from the action; slaves given the worst places, and everybody else in-between. The crowd could call for an outcome by booing or cheering, but the emperor had the final say. Spectacles could quickly become sites of social and political protest, and emperors sometimes had to deploy force to put down crowd unrest, most notoriously at the Nika riots in 532.

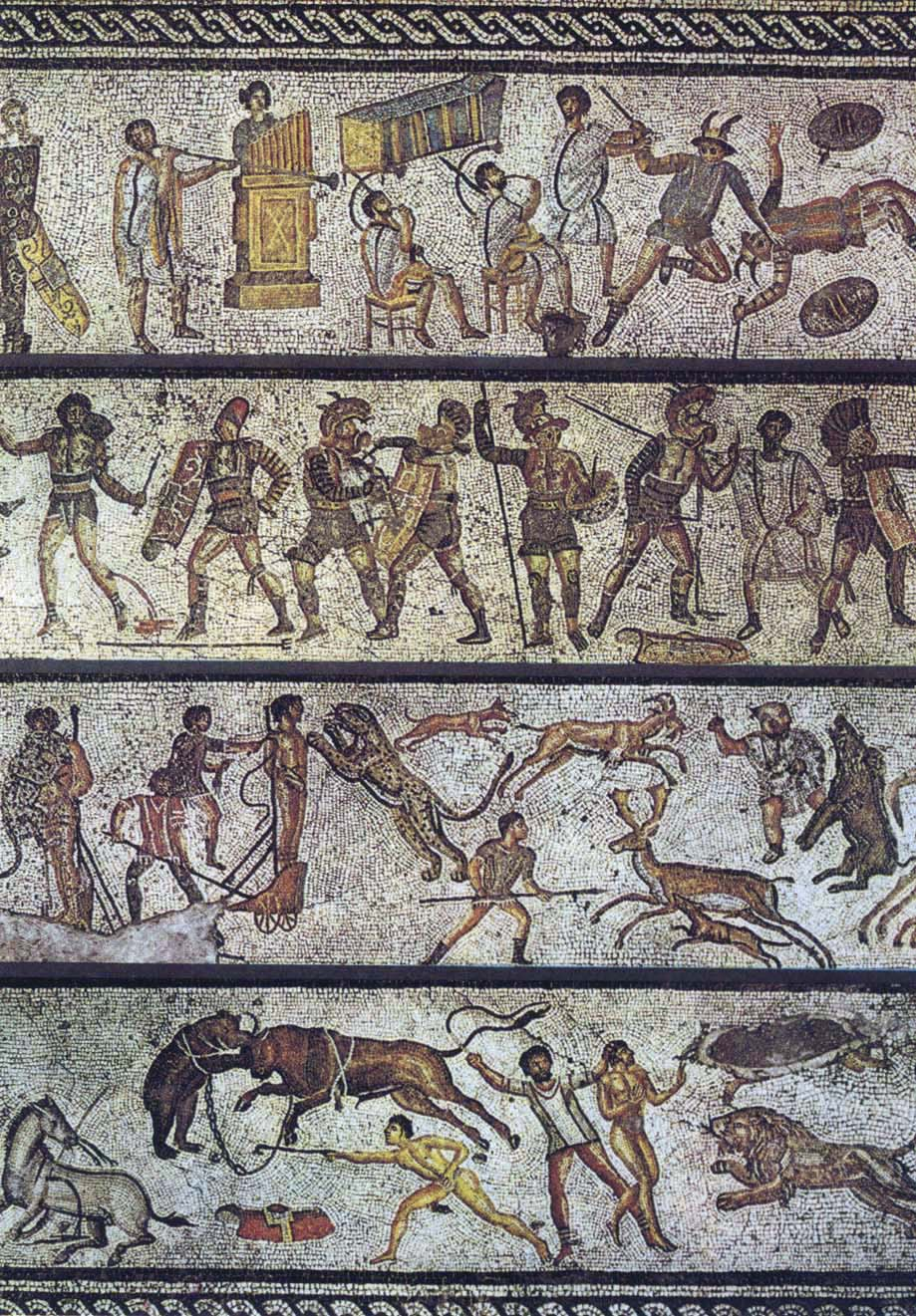
The Zliten mosaic, from a dining room in present-day Libya, depicts a series of arena scenes: from top, musicians; gladiators; beast fighters; and convicts condemned to the beasts

The chariot teams were known by the colours they wore, with the two main teams being the Blues and the Greens. Fan loyalty was fierce and at times erupted into sports riots. Racing was perilous, but charioteers were among the most celebrated and well-compensated athletes. Circuses were designed to ensure that no team had an unfair advantage and to minimize collisions (naufragia), which were nonetheless frequent and satisfying to the crowd. The races retained a magical aura through their early association with chthonic rituals: circus images were considered protective or lucky, curse tablets have been found buried at the site of racetracks, and charioteers were often suspected of sorcery. Chariot racing continued into the Byzantine period under imperial sponsorship, but the decline of cities in the 6th and 7th centuries led to its eventual demise.

The Romans thought gladiator contests had originated with funeral games and sacrifices. Some of the earliest styles of gladiator fighting had ethnic designations such as "Thracian" or "Gallic". The staged combats were considered munera, "services, offerings, benefactions", initially distinct from the festival games (ludi). To mark the opening of the Colosseum, Titus presented 100 days of arena events, with 3,000 gladiators competing on a single day. Roman fascination with gladiators is indicated by how widely they are depicted on mosaics, wall paintings, lamps, and in graffiti. Gladiators were trained combatants who might be slaves, convicts, or free volunteers. Death was not a necessary or even desirable outcome in matches between these highly skilled fighters, whose training was costly and time-consuming. By contrast, noxii were convicts sentenced to the arena with little or no training, often unarmed, and with no expectation of survival; physical suffering and humiliation were considered appropriate retributive justice. These executions were sometimes staged or ritualized as re-enactments of myths, and amphitheatres were equipped with elaborate stage machinery to create special effects.

Modern scholars have found the pleasure Romans took in the "theatre of life and death" difficult to understand. Pliny the Younger rationalized gladiator spectacles as good for the people, "to inspire them to face honourable wounds and despise death, by exhibiting love of glory and desire for victory". Some Romans such as Seneca were critical of the brutal spectacles, but found virtue in the courage and dignity of the defeated fighter—an attitude that finds its fullest expression with the Christians martyred in the arena. Tertullian considered deaths in the arena to be nothing more than a dressed-up form of human sacrifice. Even martyr literature, however, offers "detailed, indeed luxuriant, descriptions of bodily suffering", and became a popular genre at times indistinguishable from fiction.

=== Recreation ===
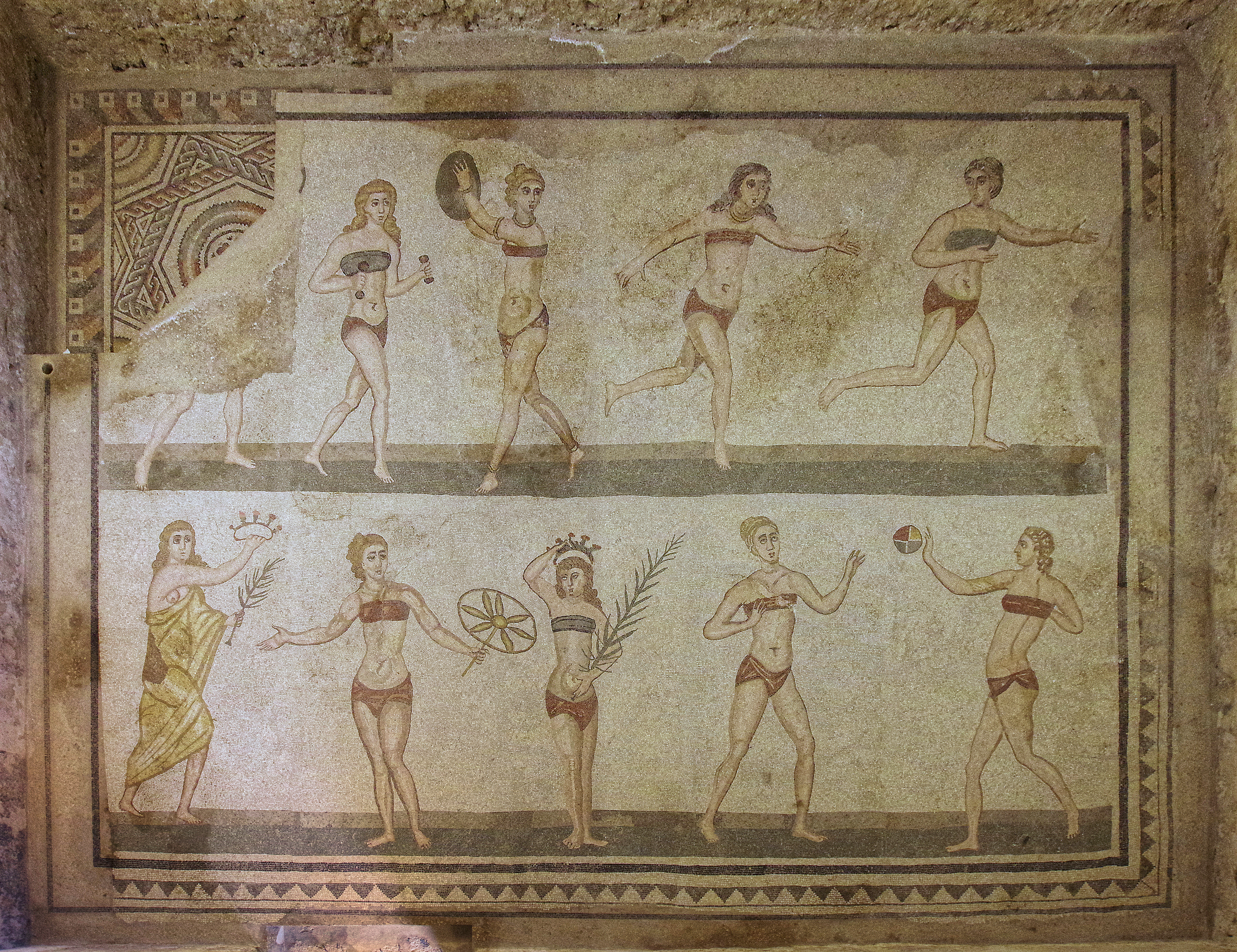
So-called "Bikini Girls" mosaic from the Villa del Casale, Roman Sicily, 4th century

The singular ludus, "play, game, sport, training", had a wide range of meanings such as "word play", "theatrical performance", "board game", "primary school", and even "gladiator training school" (as in Ludus Magnus). Activities for children and young people in the Empire included hoop rolling and knucklebones (astragali or "jacks"). Girls had dolls made of wood, terracotta, and especially bone and ivory. Ball games include trigon and harpastum. People of all ages played board games, including latrunculi ("Raiders") and XII scripta ("Twelve Marks"). A game referred to as alea (dice) or tabula (the board) may have been similar to backgammon. Dicing as a form of gambling was disapproved of, but was a popular pastime during the festival of the Saturnalia.

After adolescence, most physical training for males was of a military nature. The Campus Martius originally was an exercise field where young men learned horsemanship and warfare. Hunting was also considered an appropriate pastime. According to Plutarch, conservative Romans disapproved of Greek-style athletics that promoted a fine body for its own sake, and condemned Nero's efforts to encourage Greek-style athletic games. Some women trained as gymnasts and dancers, and a rare few as female gladiators. The "Bikini Girls" mosaic shows young women engaging in routines comparable to rhythmic gymnastics. (Note: Scholars are divided in their relative emphasis on the athletic and dance elements of these exercises: Lee, H. (1984). "Athletics and the Bikini Girls from Piazza Armerina". Stadion. 10: 45–75. sees them as gymnasts, while Torelli thinks they are dancers at the games.) Women were encouraged to maintain health through activities such as playing ball, swimming, walking, or reading aloud (as a breathing exercise).

=== Clothing ===
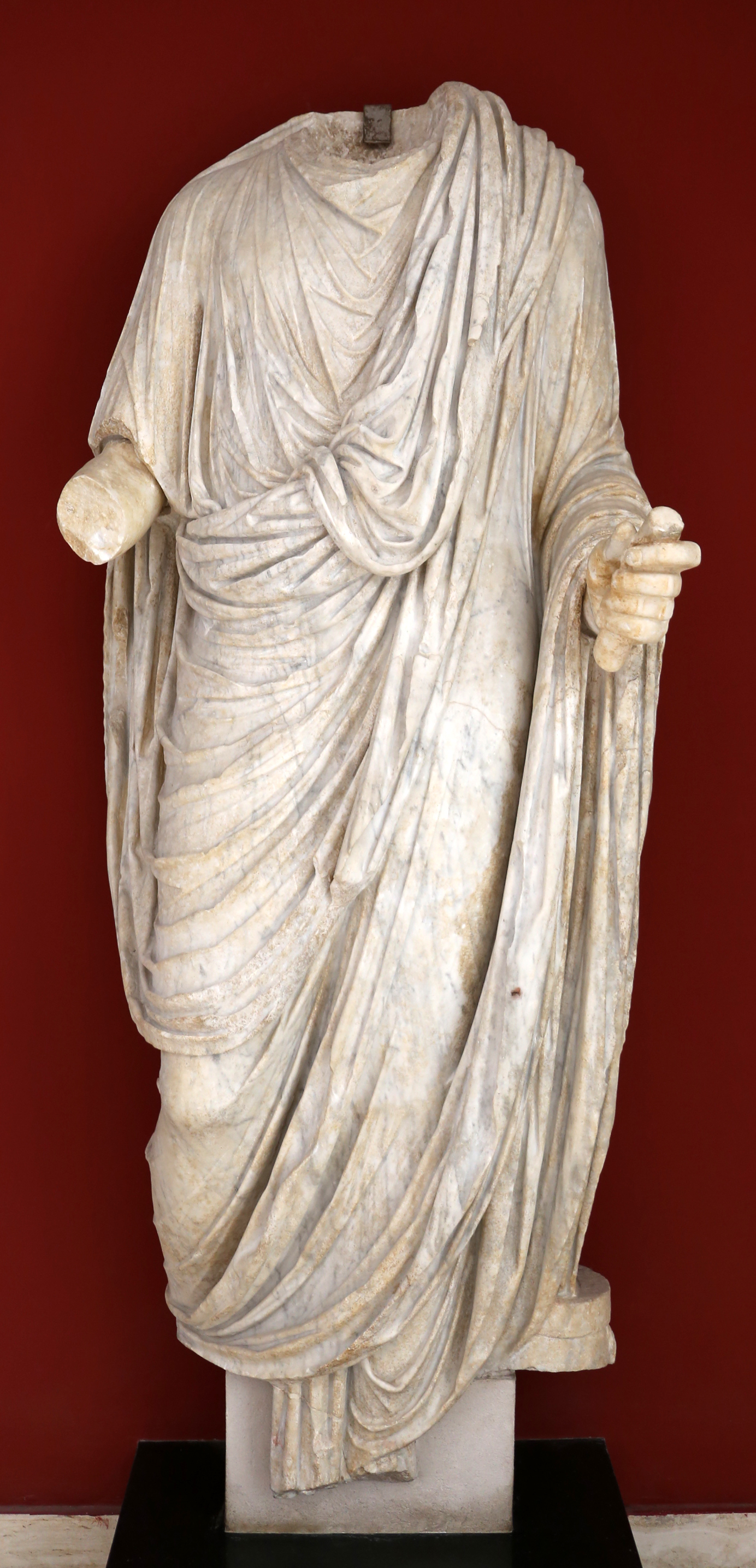
Togate statue in the Museo Archeologico Nazionale d'Abruzzo

In a status-conscious society like that of the Romans, clothing and personal adornment indicated the etiquette of interacting with the wearer. Wearing the correct clothing reflected a society in good order. There is little direct evidence of how Romans dressed in daily life, since portraiture may show the subject in clothing with symbolic value, and surviving textiles are rare.

The toga was the distinctive national garment of the male citizen, but it was heavy and impractical, worn mainly for conducting political or court business and religious rites. It was a "vast expanse" of semi-circular white wool that could not be put on and draped correctly without assistance. The drapery became more intricate and structured over time. The toga praetexta, with a purple or purplish-red stripe representing inviolability, was worn by children who had not come of age, curule magistrates, and state priests. Only the emperor could wear an all-purple toga (toga picta).

Ordinary clothing was dark or colourful. The basic garment for all Romans, regardless of gender or wealth, was the simple sleeved tunic, with length differing by wearer. The tunics of poor people and labouring slaves were made from coarse wool in natural, dull shades; finer tunics were made of lightweight wool or linen. A man of the senatorial or equestrian order wore a tunic with two purple stripes (clavi) woven vertically: the wider the stripe, the higher the wearer's status. Other garments could be layered over the tunic. Common male attire also included cloaks, and in some regions, trousers. In the 2nd century, emperors and elite men are often portrayed wearing the pallium, an originally Greek mantle; women are also portrayed in the pallium. Tertullian considered the pallium an appropriate garment both for Christians, in contrast to the toga, and for educated people.

Roman clothing styles changed over time. In the Dominate, clothing worn by both soldiers and bureaucrats became highly decorated with geometrical patterns, stylized plant motifs, and in more elaborate examples, human or animal figures. Courtiers of the later Empire wore elaborate silk robes. The militarization of Roman society, and the waning of urban life, affected fashion: heavy military-style belts were worn by bureaucrats as well as soldiers, and the toga was abandoned, replaced by the pallium as a garment embodying social unity.

== Arts ==
Greek art had a profound influence on Roman art. Public art—including sculpture, monuments such as victory columns or triumphal arches, and the iconography on coins—is often analysed for historical or ideological significance. In the private sphere, artistic objects were made for religious dedications, funerary commemoration, domestic use, and commerce. The wealthy advertised their appreciation of culture through artwork and decorative arts in their homes. Despite the value placed on art, even famous artists were of low social status, partly as they worked with their hands.

=== Portraiture ===
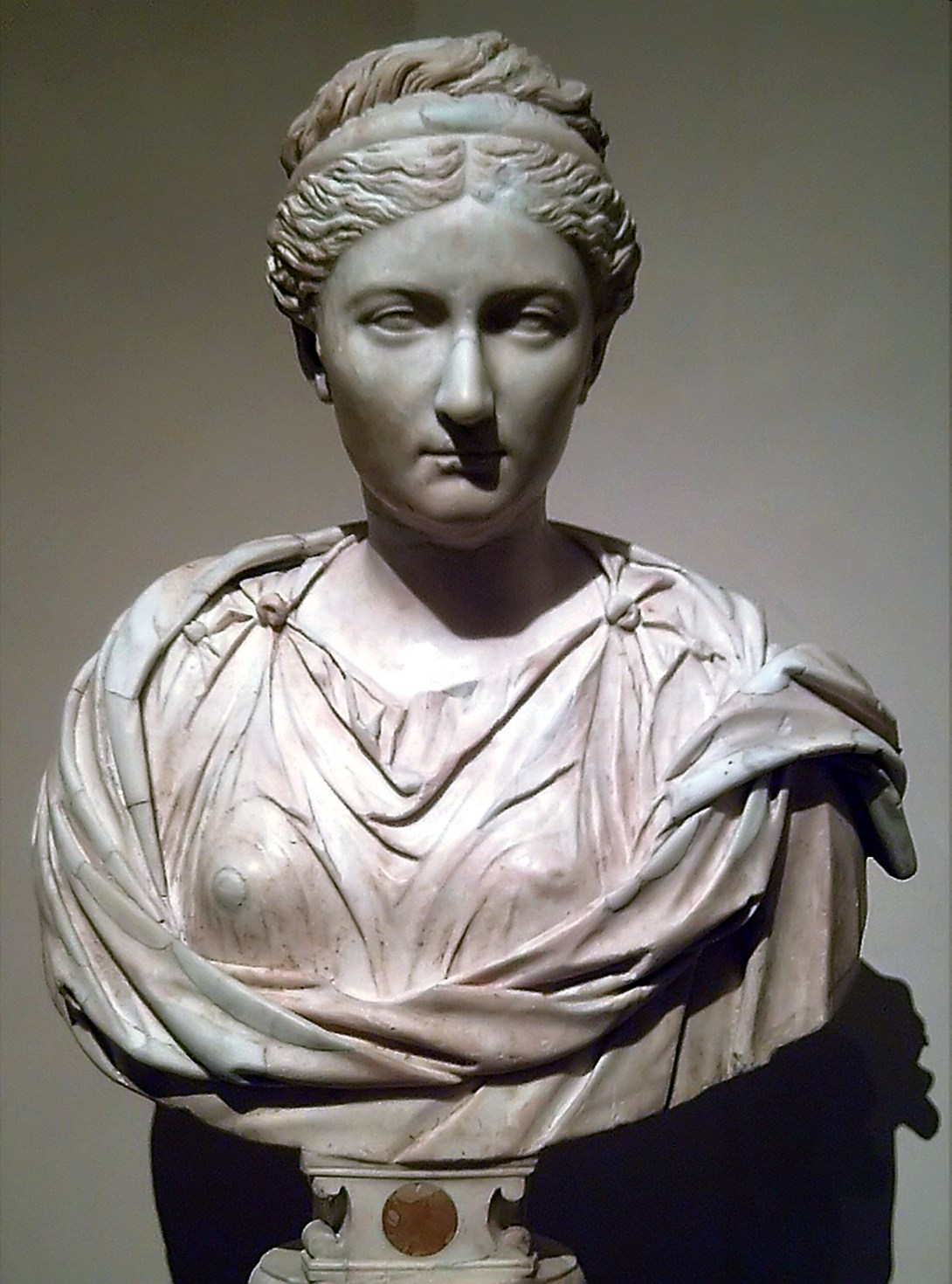
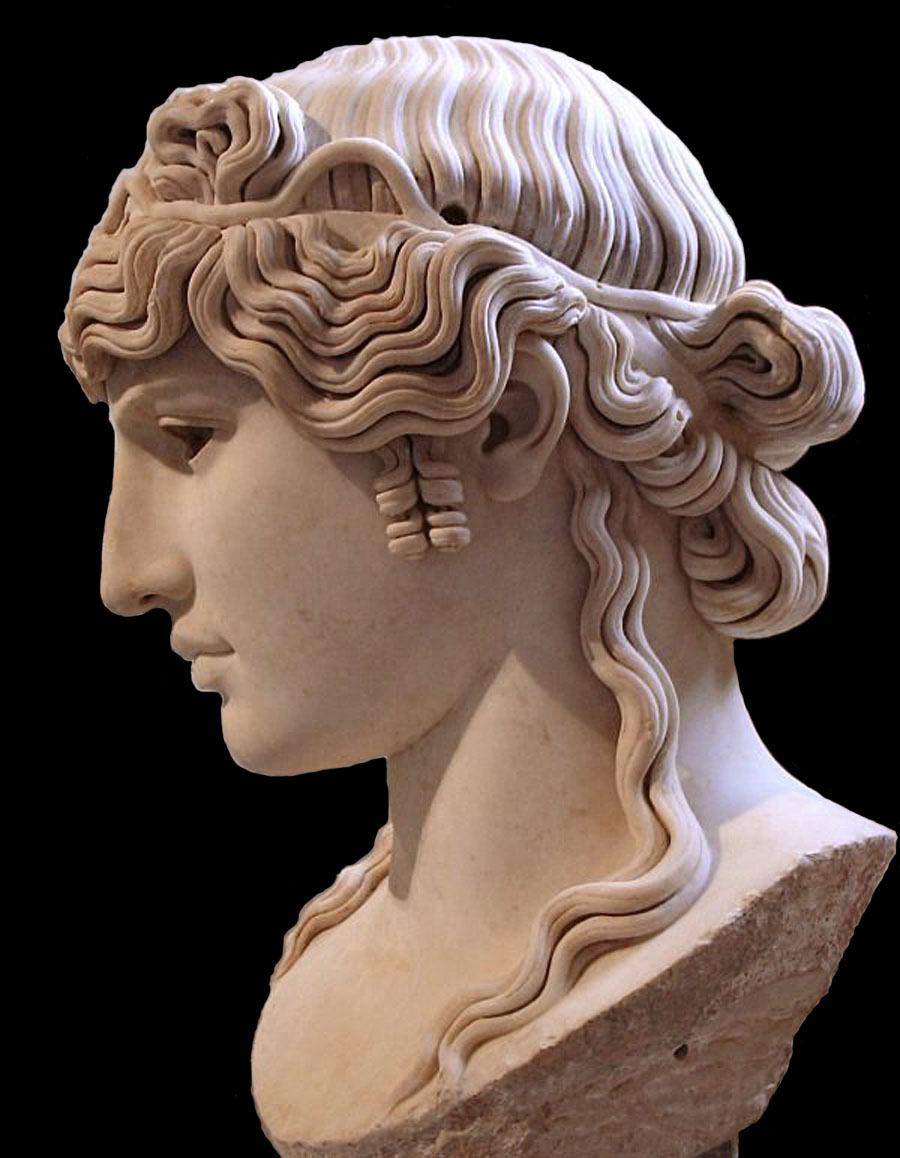
Two portraits c. 130 AD: the empress Vibia Sabina (left); and the Antinous Mondragone

Portraiture, which survives mainly in sculpture, was the most copious form of imperial art. Portraits during the Augustan period utilize classical proportions, evolving later into a mixture of realism and idealism. Republican portraits were characterized by verism, but as early as the 2nd century BC, Greek heroic nudity was adopted for conquering generals. Imperial portrait sculptures may model a mature head atop a youthful nude or semi-nude body with perfect musculature. Clothed in the toga or military regalia, the body communicates rank or role, not individual characteristics.

Portraiture in painting is represented primarily by the Fayum mummy portraits, which evoke Egyptian and Roman traditions of commemorating the dead with realistic painting. Marble portrait sculpture were painted, but traces have rarely survived.

=== Sculpture and sarcophagi ===
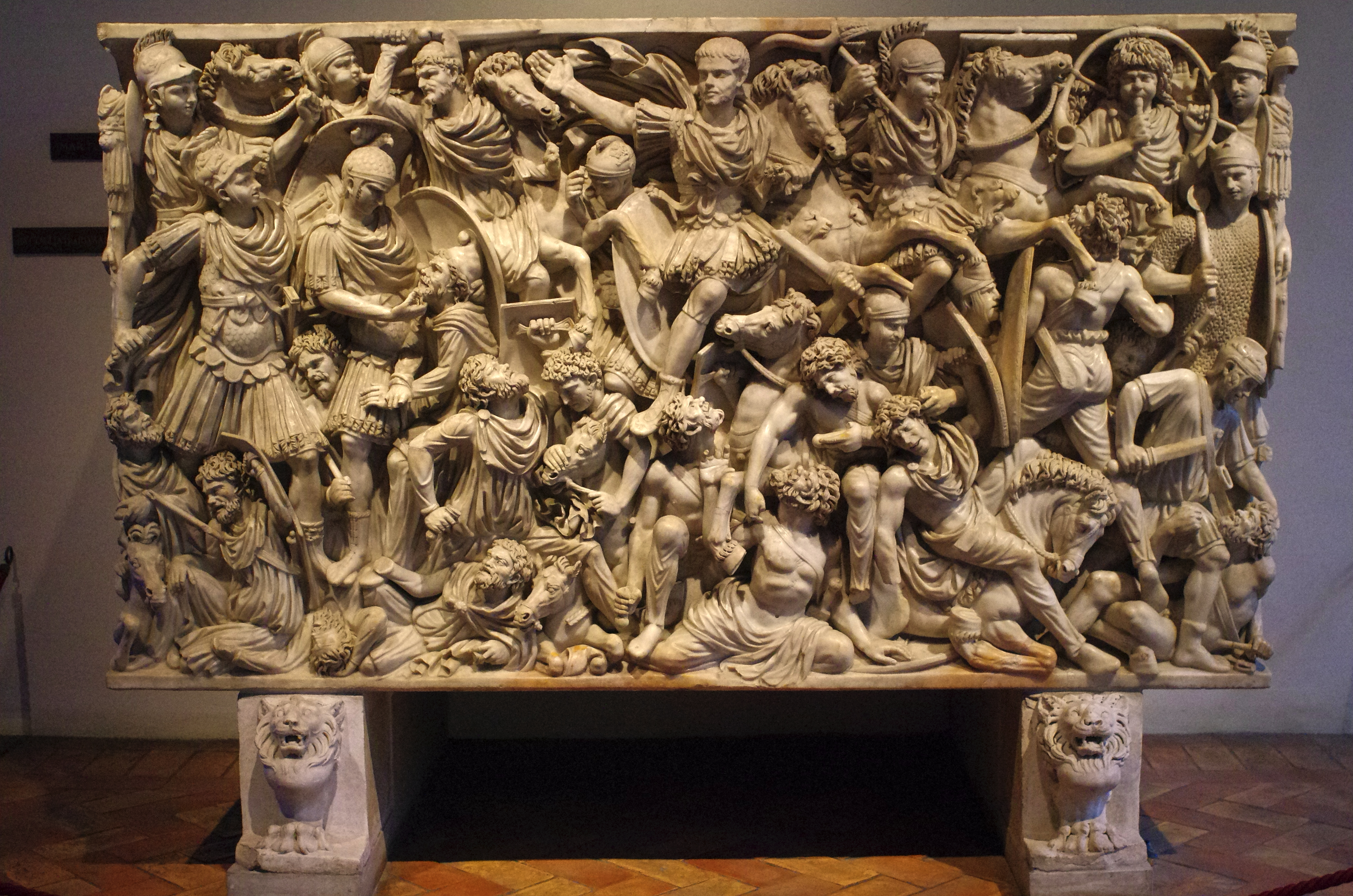
On the Ludovisi sarcophagus

Examples of Roman sculpture survive abundantly, though often in damaged or fragmentary condition, including freestanding statuary in marble, bronze and terracotta, and reliefs from public buildings and monuments. Niches in amphitheatres were originally filled with statues, as were formal gardens. Temples housed cult images of deities, often by famed sculptors.

Elaborately carved marble and limestone sarcophagi are characteristic of the 2nd to 4th centuries. Sarcophagus relief has been called the "richest single source of Roman iconography", depicting mythological scenes or Jewish/Christian imagery as well as the deceased's life.

=== Painting ===
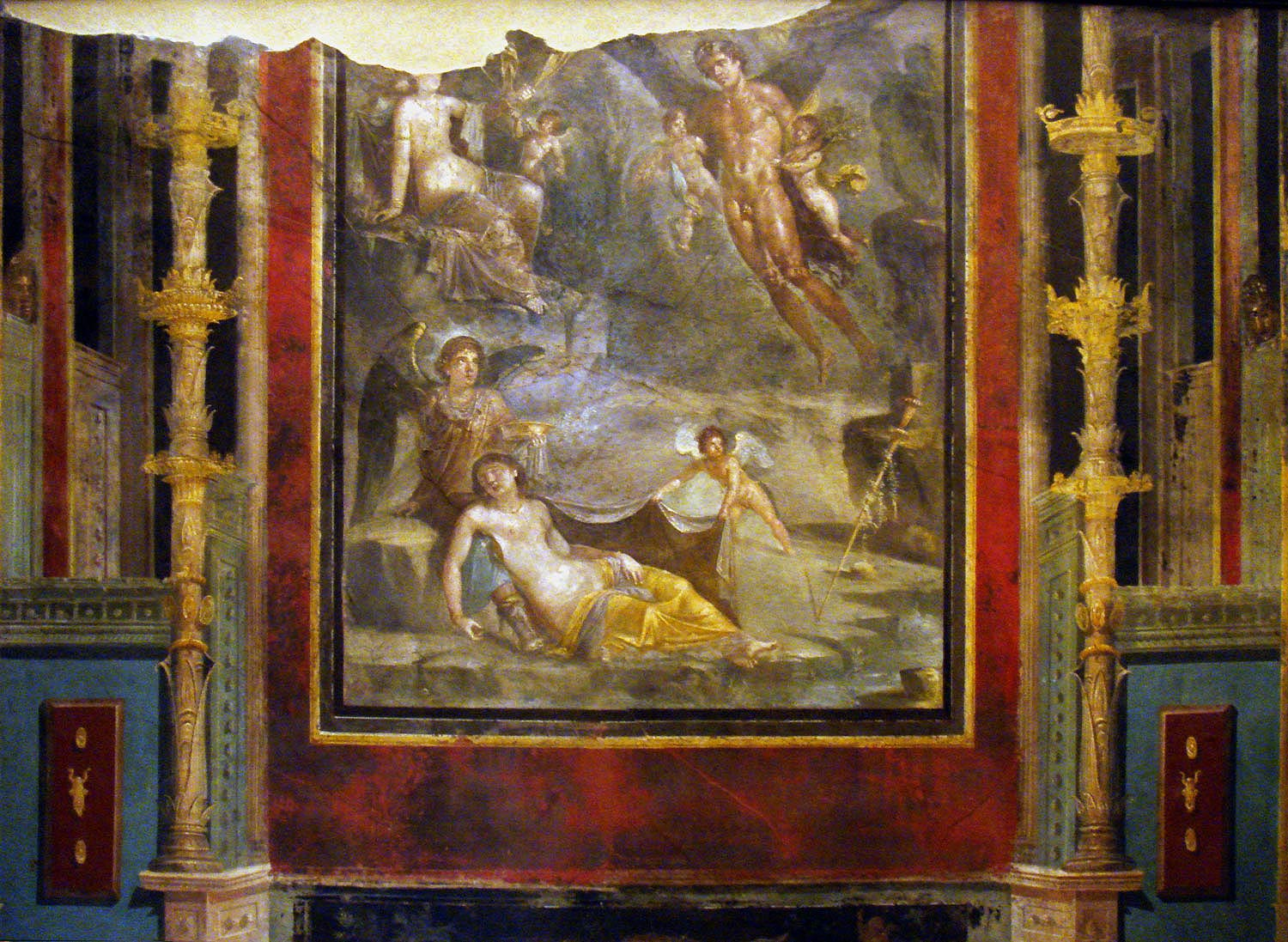
The Wedding of Zephyrus and Chloris (54–68 AD, Pompeian Fourth Style) within painted architectural panels from the Casa del Naviglio

Initial Roman painting drew from Etruscan and Greek models and techniques. Examples of Roman paintings can be found in palaces, catacombs and villas. Much of what is known of Roman painting is from the interior decoration of private homes, particularly as preserved by the eruption of Vesuvius. In addition to decorative borders and panels with geometric or vegetative motifs, wall painting depicts scenes from mythology and theatre, landscapes and gardens, spectacles, everyday life, and erotic art.

=== Mosaic ===
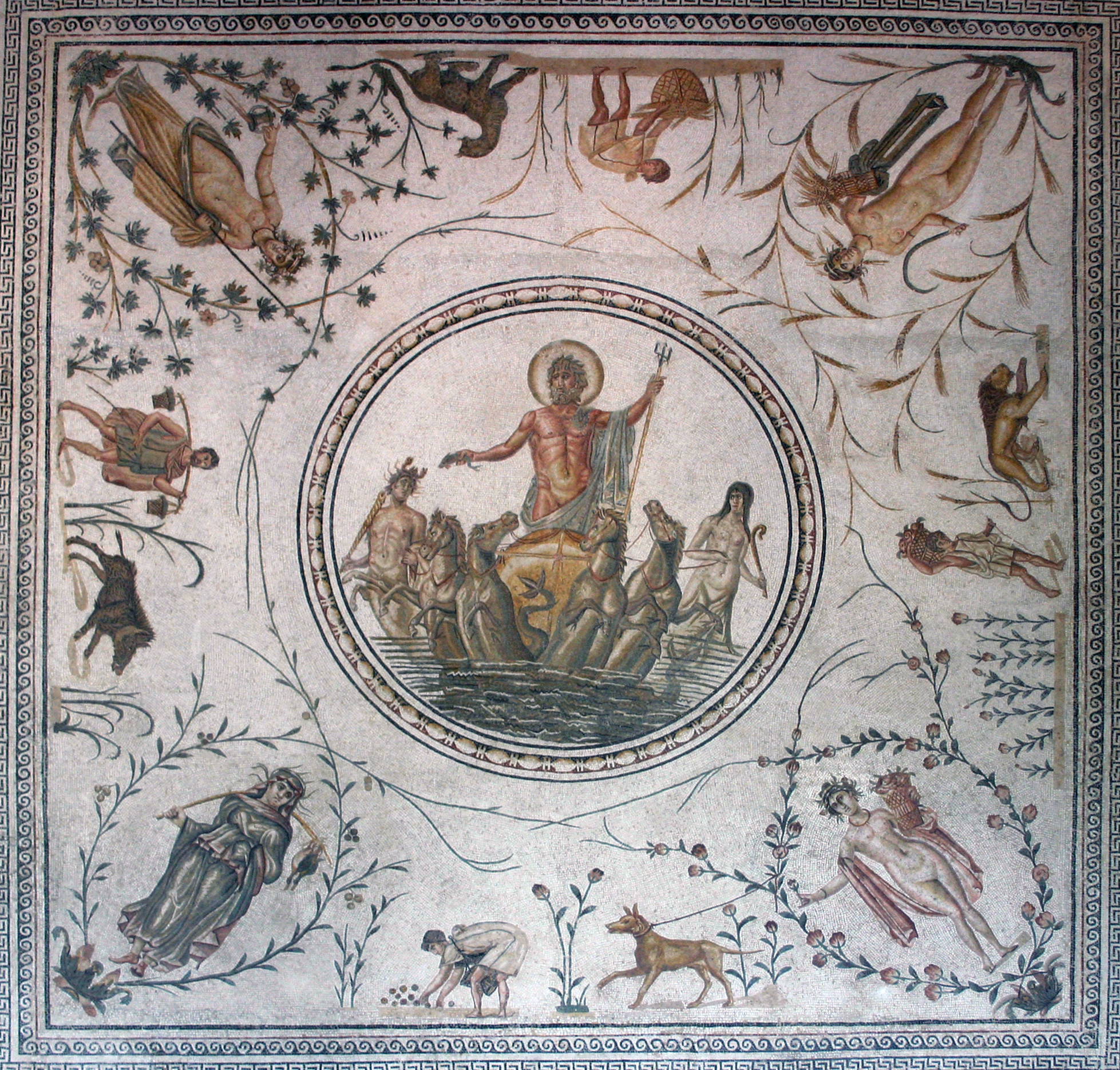
The Triumph of Neptune floor mosaic from Africa Proconsularis (present-day Tunisia)

Mosaics are among the most enduring of Roman decorative arts, and are found on floors and other architectural features. The most common is the tessellated mosaic, formed from uniform pieces (tesserae) of materials such as stone and glass. Opus sectile is a related technique in which flat stone, usually coloured marble, is cut precisely into shapes from which geometric or figurative patterns are formed. This more difficult technique became especially popular for luxury surfaces in the 4th century (e.g. the Basilica of Junius Bassus).

Figurative mosaics share many themes with painting, and in some cases use almost identical compositions. Geometric patterns and mythological scenes occur throughout the Empire. In North Africa, a particularly rich source of mosaics, homeowners often chose scenes of life on their estates, hunting, agriculture, and local wildlife. Plentiful and major examples of Roman mosaics come also from present-day Syria (particularly the Antioch mosaics), Italy, southern France, Spain, and Portugal.

=== Decorative arts ===
Decorative arts for luxury consumers included fine pottery, silver and bronze vessels and implements, and glassware. Pottery manufacturing was economically important, as were the glass and metalworking industries. Imports stimulated new regional centres of production. Southern Gaul became a leading producer of the finer red-gloss pottery (terra sigillata) that was a major trade good in 1st-century Europe. Glassblowing was regarded by the Romans as originating in Syria in the 1st century BC, and by the 3rd century, Egypt and the Rhineland had become noted for fine glass.

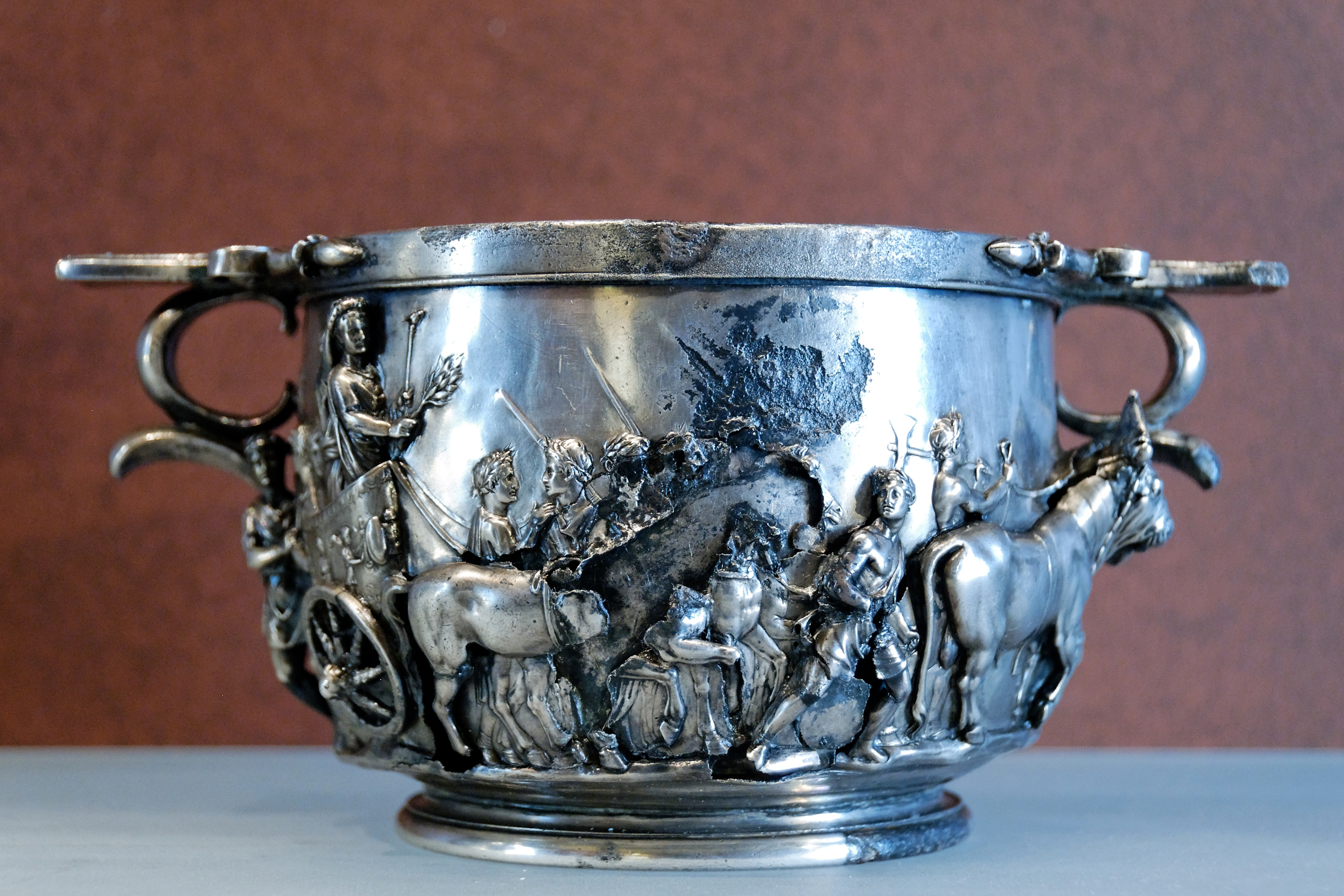
Silver cup, from the Boscoreale Treasure (early 1st century AD)

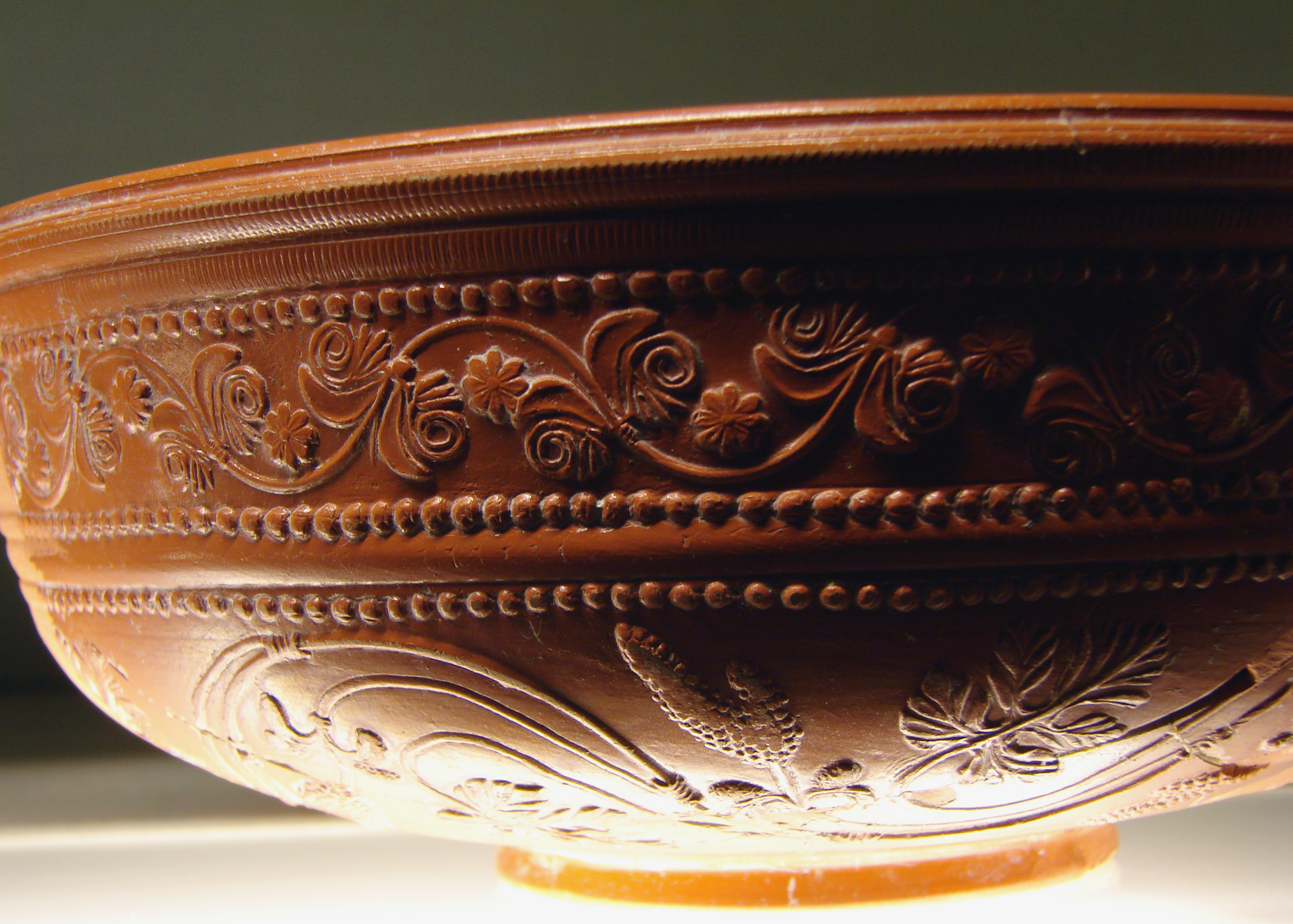
Finely decorated Gallo-Roman terra sigillata bowl

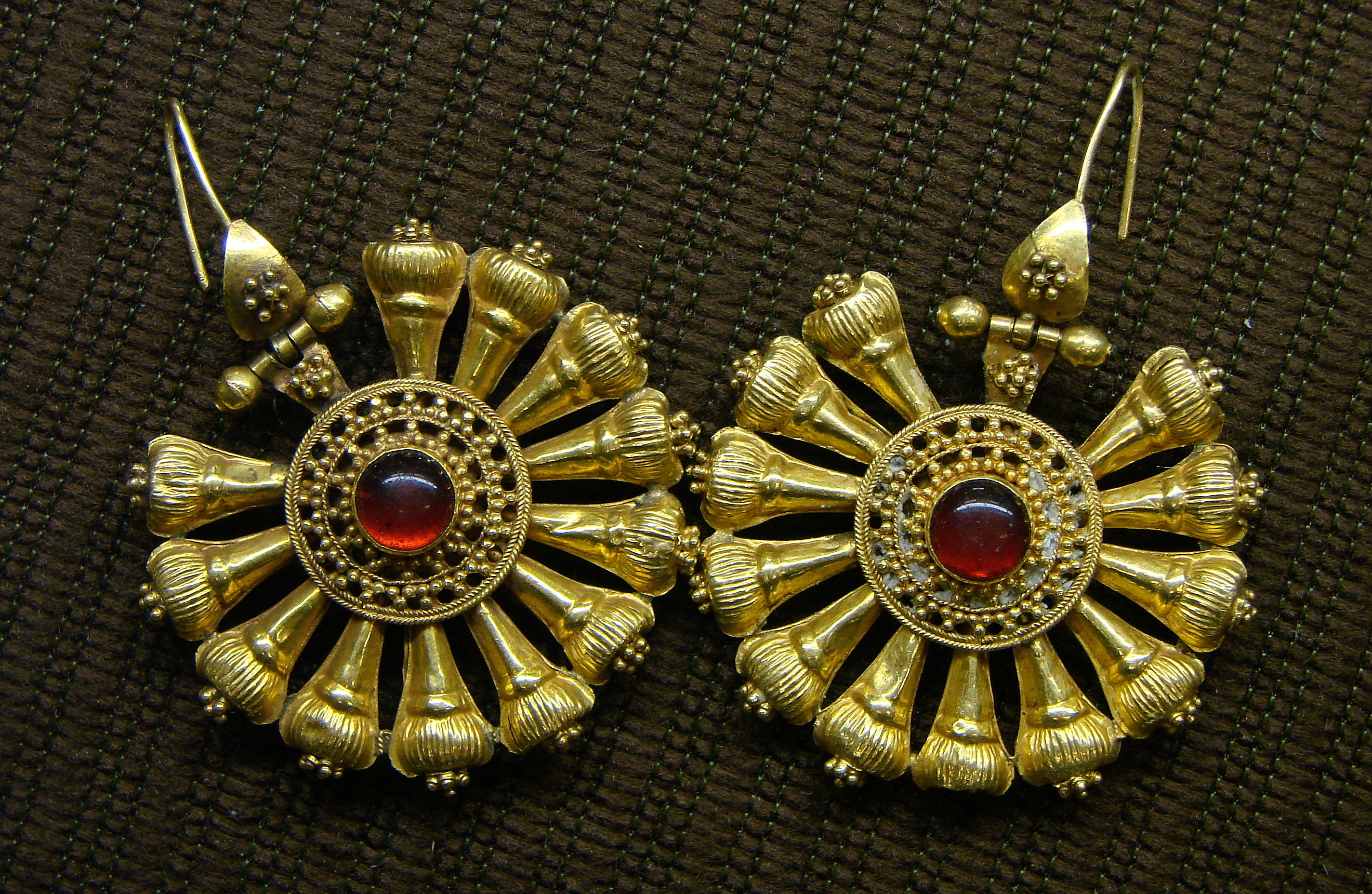
Gold earrings with gemstones, 3rd century

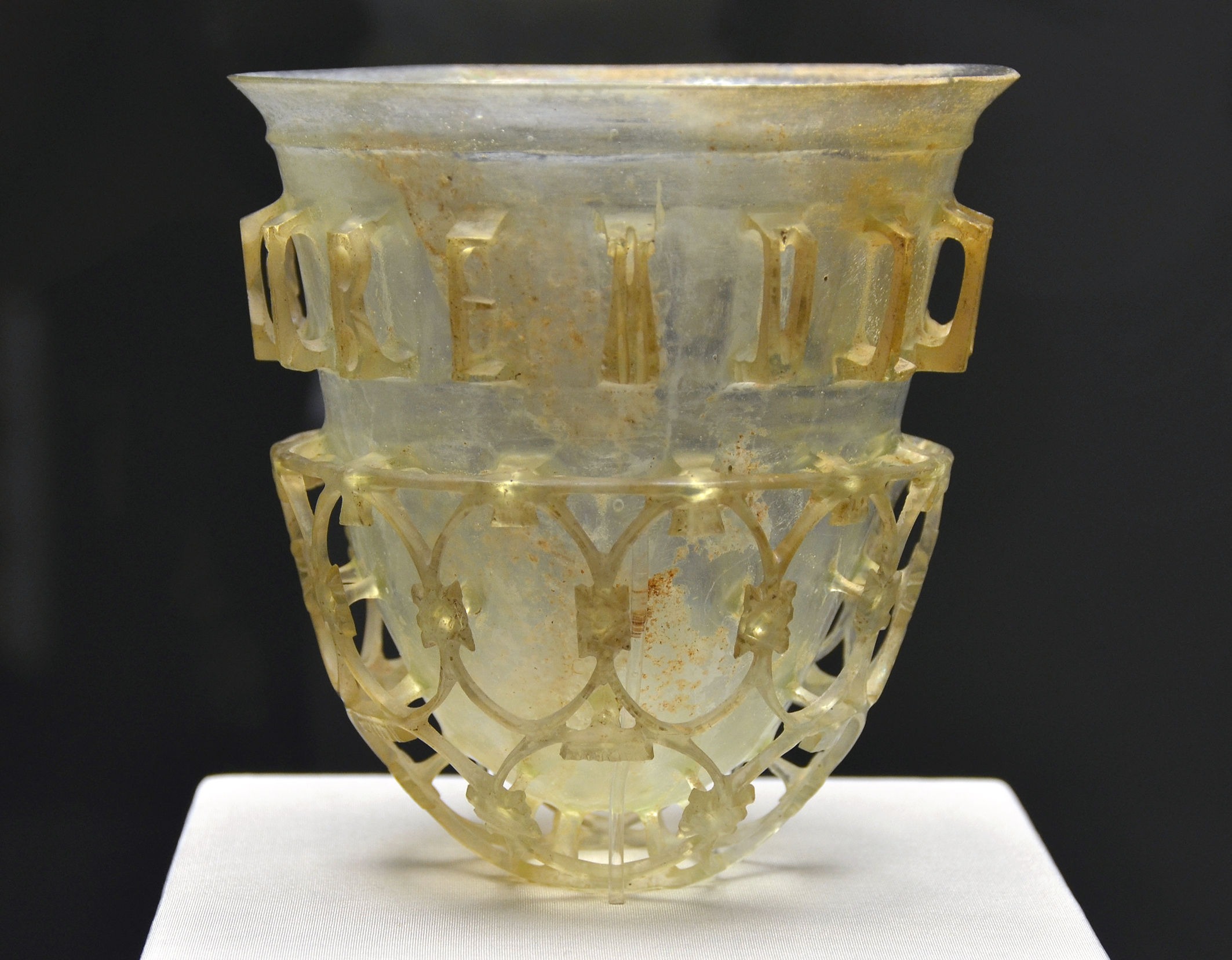
Glass cage cup from the Rhineland, 4th century

=== Performing arts ===
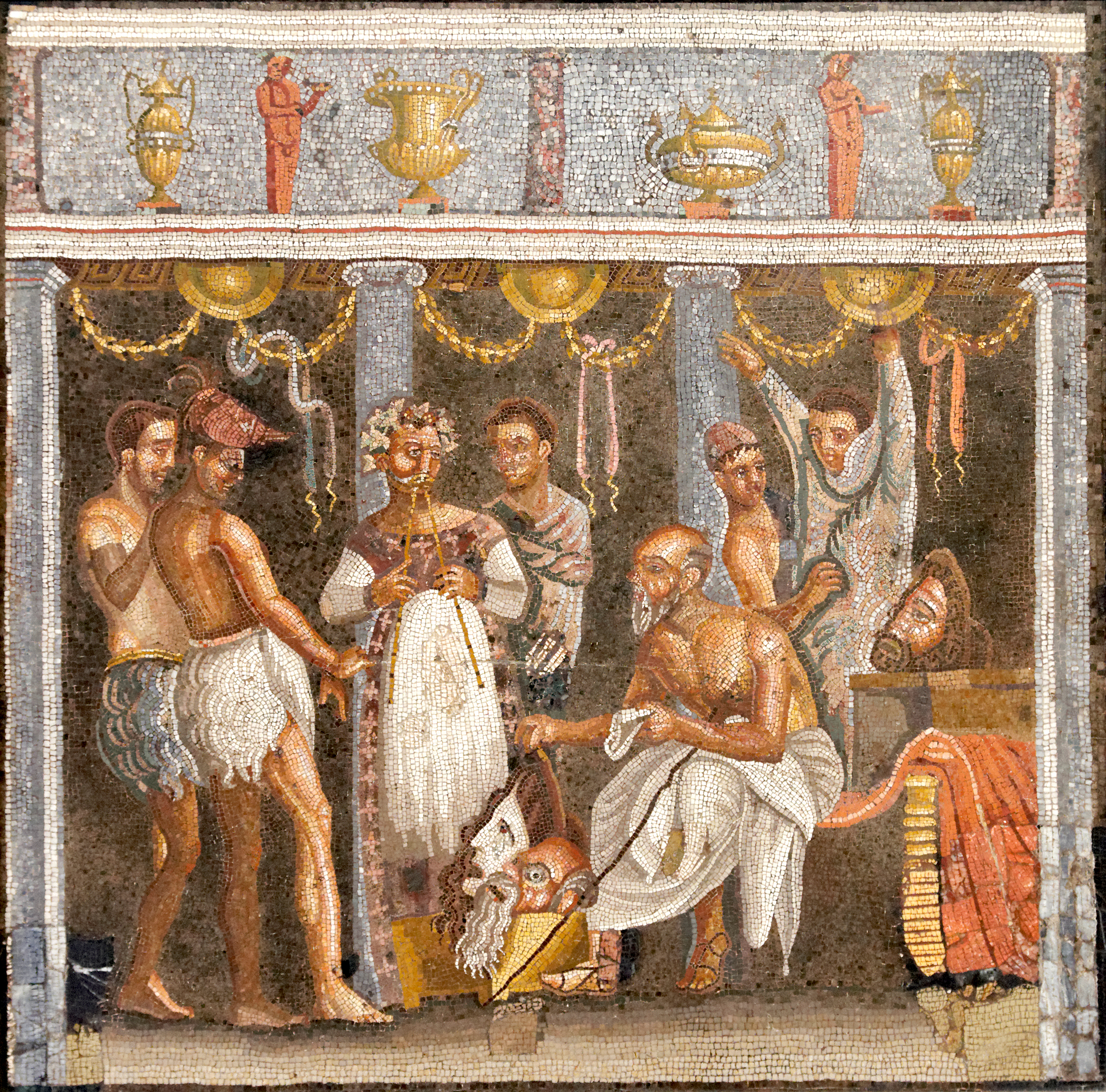
All-male theatrical troupe preparing for a masked performance, on a mosaic from the House of the Tragic Poet

In Roman tradition, borrowed from the Greeks, literary theatre was performed by all-male troupes that used face masks with exaggerated facial expressions to portray emotion. Female roles were played by men in drag (travesti). Roman literary theatre tradition is represented in Latin literature by the tragedies of Seneca, for example.

More popular than literary theatre was the genre-defying mimus theatre, which featured scripted scenarios with free improvisation, risqué language and sex scenes, action sequences, and political satire, along with dance, juggling, acrobatics, tightrope walking, striptease, and dancing bears. Unlike literary theatre, mimus was played without masks, and encouraged stylistic realism. Female roles were performed by women. Mimus was related to pantomimus, an early form of story ballet that contained no spoken dialogue but rather a sung libretto, often mythological, either tragic or comic.

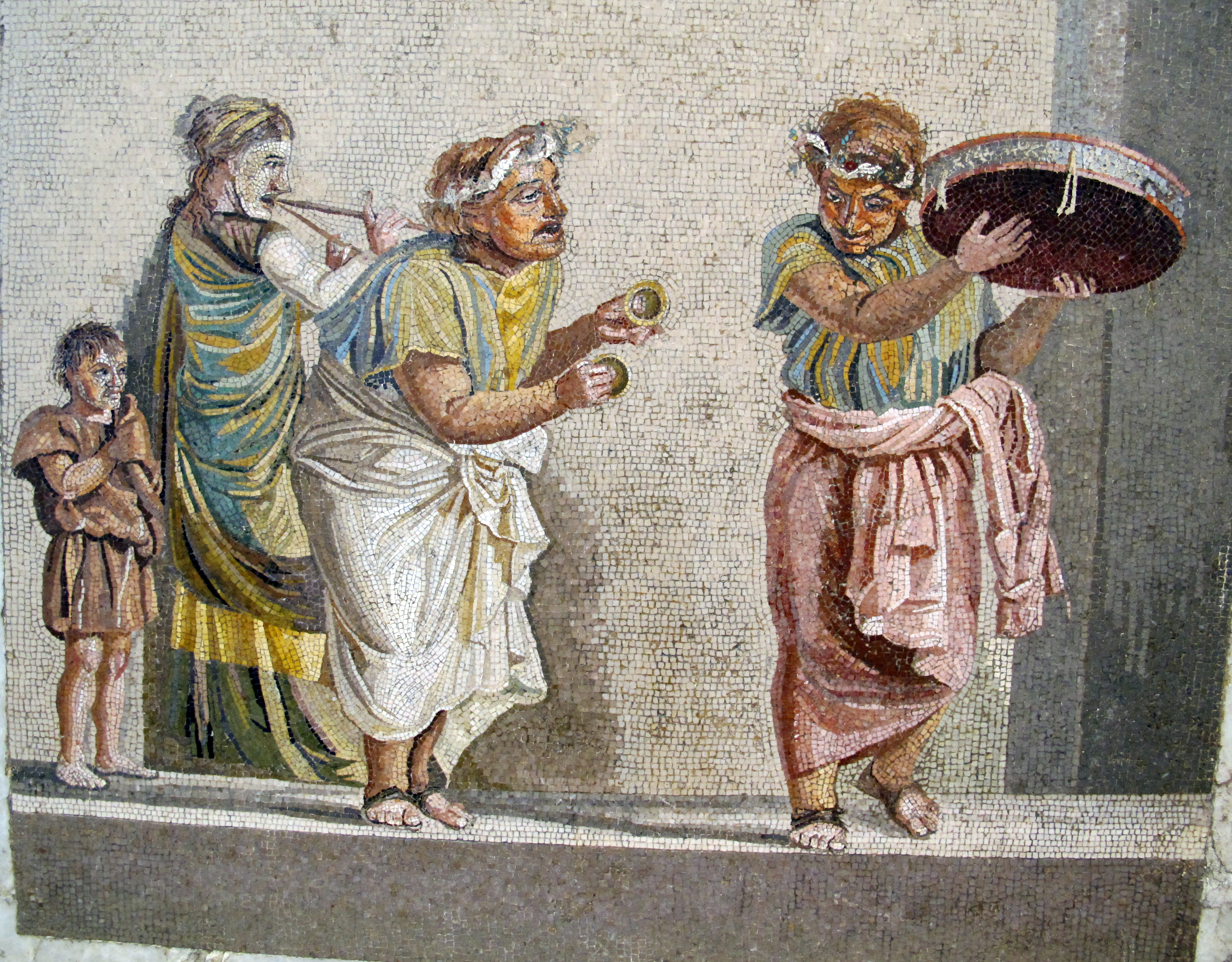
Trio of musicians playing an aulos, cymbala, and tympanum (mosaic from Pompeii)

Although sometimes regarded as foreign, music and dance existed in Rome from earliest times. Music was customary at funerals, and the tibia, a woodwind instrument, was played at sacrifices. Song (carmen) was integral to almost every social occasion. Music was thought to reflect the orderliness of the cosmos. Various woodwinds and "brass" instruments were played, as were stringed instruments such as the cithara, and percussion. The cornu, a long tubular metal wind instrument, was used for military signals and on parade. These instruments spread throughout the provinces and are widely depicted in Roman art. The hydraulic pipe organ (hydraulis) was "one of the most significant technical and musical achievements of antiquity", and accompanied gladiator games and events in the amphitheatre. Although certain dances were seen at times as non-Roman or unmanly, dancing was embedded in religious rituals of archaic Rome. Ecstatic dancing was a feature of the mystery religions, particularly the cults of Cybele and Isis. In the secular realm, dancing girls from Syria and Cadiz were extremely popular.

Like gladiators, entertainers were legally infames, technically free but little better than slaves. "Stars", however, could enjoy considerable wealth and celebrity, and mingled socially and often sexually with the elite. Performers supported each other by forming guilds, and several memorials for theatre members survive. Theatre and dance were often condemned by Christian polemicists in the later Empire.

== Literacy, books, and education ==
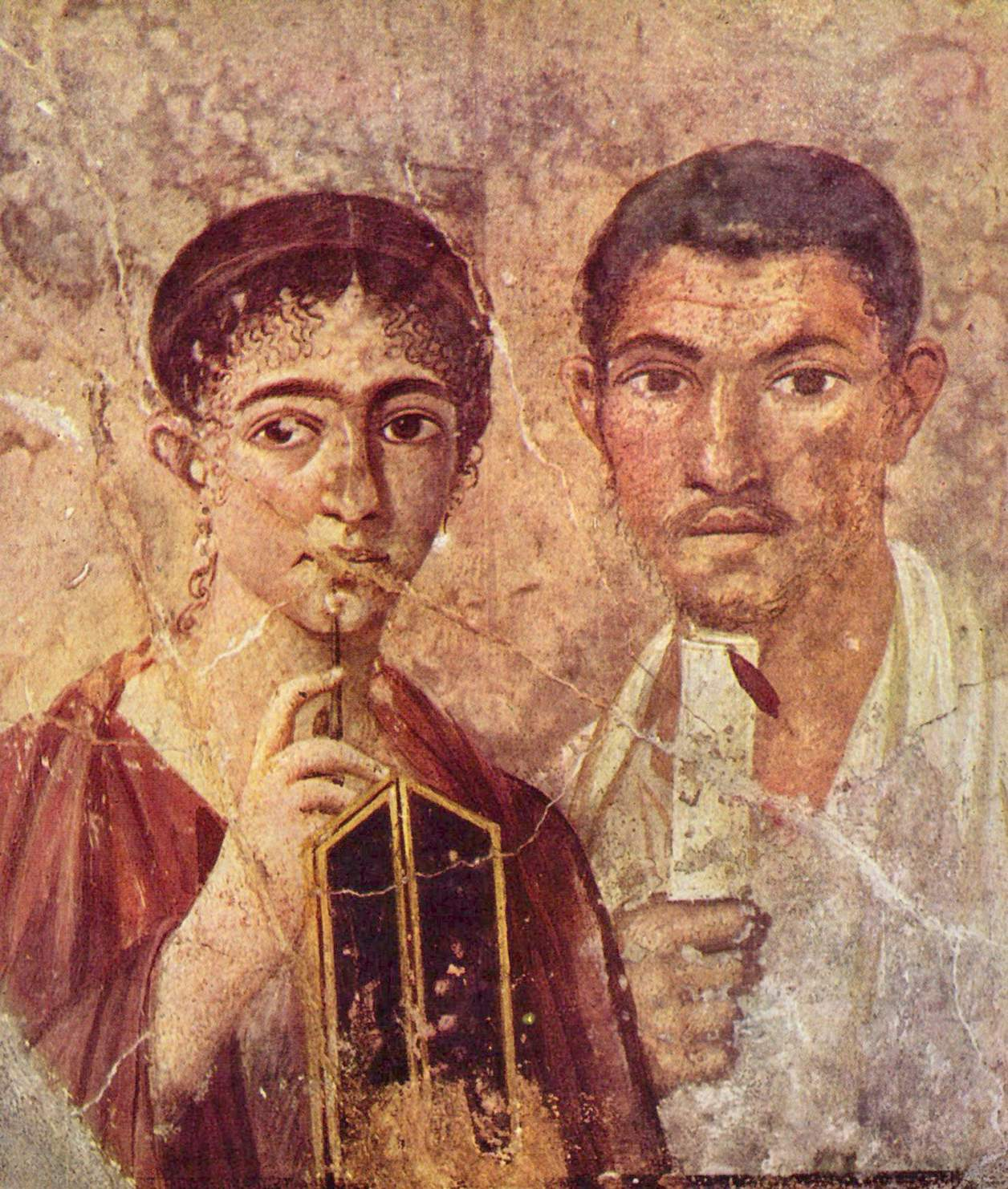
Pride in literacy was displayed through emblems of reading and writing, as in this portrait of Terentius Neo and his wife (c. 20 AD).

Estimates of the average literacy rate range from 5 to over 30%. The Roman obsession with documents and inscriptions indicates the value placed on the written word. (Note: Clifford Ando posed the question as "what good would 'posted edicts' do in a world of low literacy?'.) Laws and edicts were posted as well as read out. Illiterate Roman subjects could have a government scribe (scriba) read or write their official documents for them. The military produced extensive written records.

Numeracy was necessary for commerce. Slaves were numerate and literate in significant numbers; some were highly educated. Graffiti and low-quality inscriptions with misspellings and solecisms indicate casual literacy among non-elites. (Note: Political slogans and obscenities are widely preserved as graffiti in Pompeii: Antonio Varone, Erotica Pompeiana: Love Inscriptions on the Walls of Pompeii ("L'Erma" di Bretschneider, 2002). Soldiers sometimes inscribed sling bullets with aggressive messages: Phang, "Military Documents, Languages, and Literacy," p. 300.)

The Romans had an extensive priestly archive, and inscriptions appear throughout the Empire in connection with votives dedicated by ordinary people, as well as "magic spells" (e.g. the Greek Magical Papyri).

Books were expensive, since each copy had to be written out on a papyrus roll (volumen) by scribes. The codex—pages bound to a spine—was still a novelty in the 1st century, but by the end of the 3rd century was replacing the volumen. Commercial book production was established by the late Republic, and by the 1st century certain neighbourhoods of Rome and Western provincial cities were known for their bookshops. The quality of editing varied wildly, and plagiarism or forgery were common, since there was no copyright law.

Reconstruction of a wax writing tablet

Collectors amassed personal libraries, and a fine library was part of the cultivated leisure (otium) associated with the villa lifestyle. Significant collections might attract "in-house" scholars, and an individual benefactor might endow a community with a library (as Pliny the Younger did in Comum). Imperial libraries were open to users on a limited basis, and represented a literary canon. Books considered subversive might be publicly burned, and Domitian crucified copyists for reproducing works deemed treasonous.

Literary texts were often shared aloud at meals or with reading groups. Public readings (recitationes) expanded from the 1st through the 3rd century, giving rise to "consumer literature" for entertainment. Illustrated books, including erotica, were popular, but are poorly represented by extant fragments.

Literacy began to decline during the Crisis of the Third Century. The emperor Julian banned Christians from teaching the classical curriculum, but the Church Fathers and other Christians adopted Latin and Greek literature, philosophy and science in biblical interpretation. As the Western Roman Empire declined, reading became rarer even for those within the Church hierarchy, although it continued in the Byzantine Empire.

=== Education ===
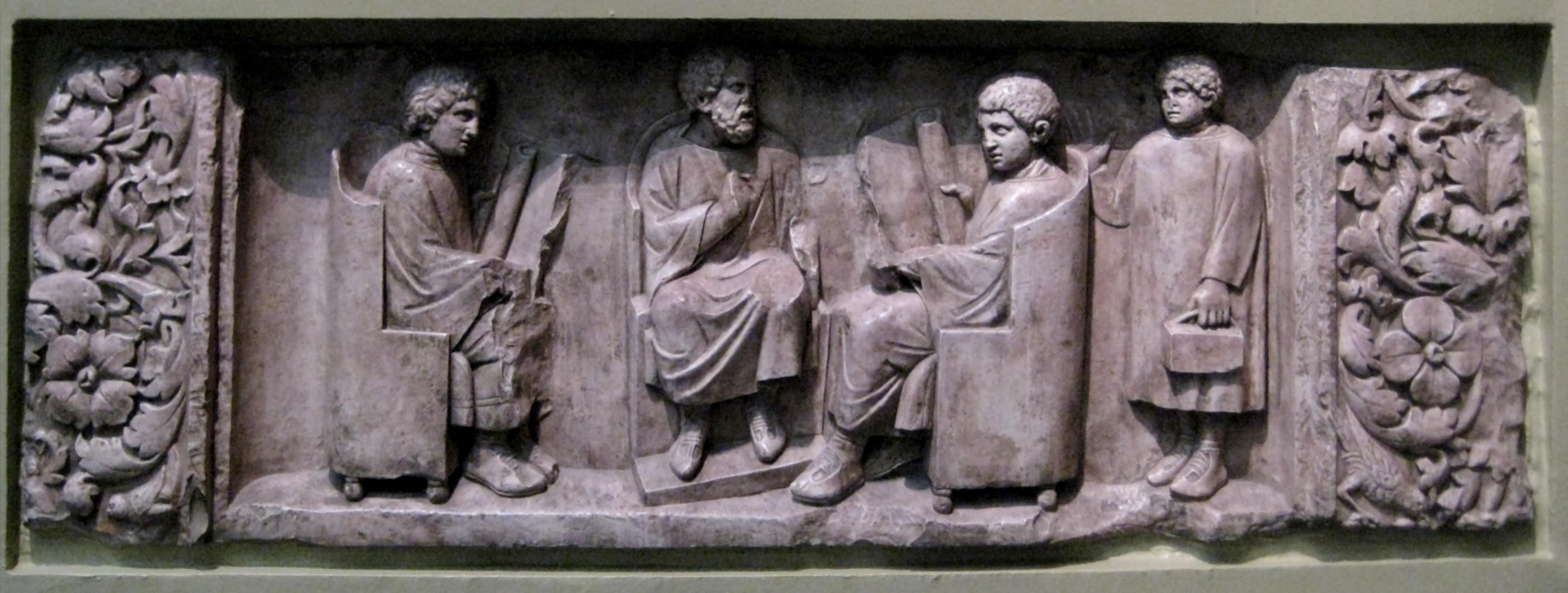
A teacher with two students, as a third arrives with his loculus, a writing case

Traditional Roman education was moral and practical. Stories were meant to instil Roman values (mores maiorum). Parents were expected to act as role models, and working parents passed their skills to their children, who might also enter apprenticeships. Young children were attended by a pedagogue, usually a Greek slave or former slave, who kept the child safe, taught self-discipline and public behaviour, attended class and helped with tutoring.

Formal education was available only to families who could pay for it; lack of state support contributed to low literacy. Primary education in reading, writing, and arithmetic might take place at home if parents hired or bought a teacher. Other children attended "public" schools organized by a schoolmaster (ludimagister) paid by parents. Vernae (homeborn slave children) might share in-home or public schooling. Boys and girls received primary education generally from ages 7 to 12, but classes were not segregated by grade or age. Most schools employed corporal punishment. For the socially ambitious, education in Greek as well as Latin was necessary. Schools became more numerous during the Empire, increasing educational opportunities.

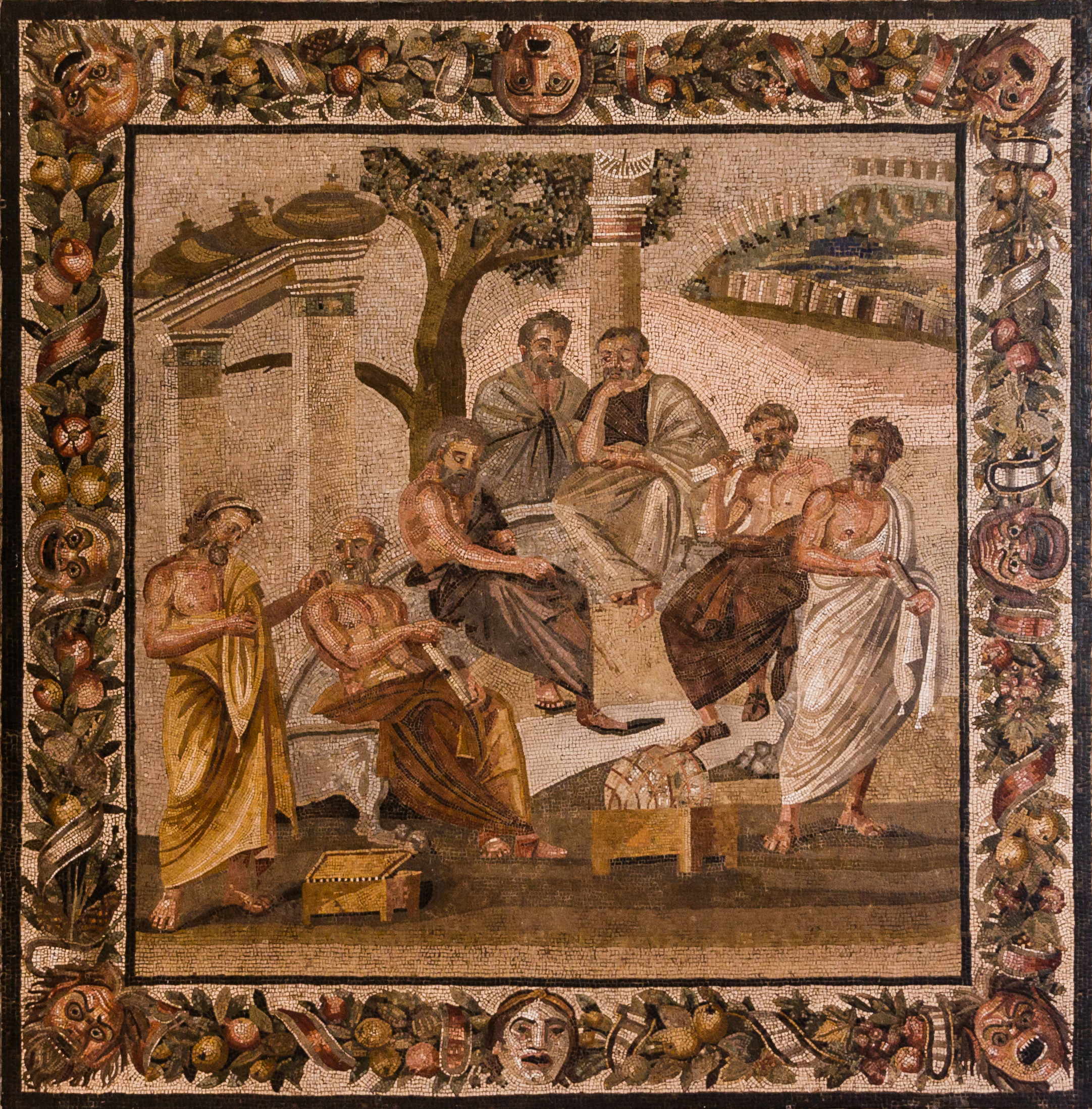
Mosaic from Pompeii depicting the Academy of Plato

At the age of 14, upperclass males made their rite of passage into adulthood, and began to learn leadership roles through mentoring from a senior family member or family friend. Higher education was provided by grammatici or rhetores. The grammaticus or "grammarian" taught mainly Greek and Latin literature, with history, geography, philosophy or mathematics treated as explications of the text. With the rise of Augustus, contemporary Latin authors such as Virgil and Livy also became part of the curriculum. The rhetor was a teacher of oratory or public speaking. The art of speaking (ars dicendi) was highly prized, and eloquentia ("speaking ability, eloquence") was considered the "glue" of civilized society. Rhetoric was not so much a body of knowledge (though it required a command of the literary canon) as it was a mode of expression that distinguished those who held social power. The ancient model of rhetorical training—"restraint, coolness under pressure, modesty, and good humour"—endured into the 18th century as a Western educational ideal.

In Latin, illiteratus could mean both "unable to read and write" and "lacking in cultural awareness or sophistication". Higher education promoted career advancement. Urban elites throughout the Empire shared a literary culture imbued with Greek educational ideals (paideia). Hellenistic cities sponsored schools of higher learning to express cultural achievement. Young Roman men often went abroad to study rhetoric and philosophy, mostly to Athens. The curriculum in the East was more likely to include music and physical training. On the Hellenistic model, Vespasian endowed chairs of grammar, Latin and Greek rhetoric, and philosophy at Rome, and gave secondary teachers special exemptions from taxes and legal penalties. In the Eastern Empire, Berytus (present-day Beirut) was unusual in offering a Latin education, and became famous for its school of Roman law. The cultural movement known as the Second Sophistic (1st–3rd century AD) promoted the assimilation of Greek and Roman social, educational, and esthetic values.

Literate women ranged from cultured aristocrats to girls trained to be calligraphers and scribes. The ideal woman in Augustan love poetry was educated and well-versed in the arts. Education seems to have been standard for daughters of the senatorial and equestrian orders. An educated wife was an asset for the socially ambitious household.

=== Literature ===
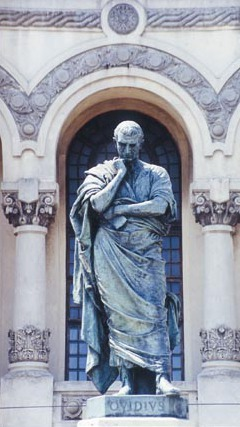
Statue in Constanța, Romania (the ancient colony Tomis), commemorating Ovid's exile

Literature under Augustus, along with that of the Republic, has been viewed as the "Golden Age" of Latin literature, embodying classical ideals. The three most influential Classical Latin poets—Virgil, Horace, and Ovid—belong to this period. Virgil's Aeneid was a national epic in the manner of the Homeric epics of Greece. Horace perfected the use of Greek lyric metres in Latin verse. Ovid's erotic poetry was enormously popular, but ran afoul of Augustan morality, contributing to his exile. Ovid's Metamorphoses wove together Greco-Roman mythology; his versions of Greek myths became a primary source of later classical mythology, and his work was hugely influential on medieval literature. The early Principate produced satirists such as Persius and Juvenal.

The mid-1st through mid-2nd century has conventionally been called the "Silver Age" of Latin literature. The three leading writers—Seneca, Lucan, and Petronius—committed suicide after incurring Nero's displeasure. Epigrammatist and social observer Martial and the epic poet Statius, whose poetry collection Silvae influenced Renaissance literature, wrote during the reign of Domitian. Other authors of the Silver Age included Pliny the Elder, author of the encyclopedic Natural History; his nephew, Pliny the Younger; and the historian Tacitus.

The principal Latin prose author of the Augustan age is the historian Livy, whose account of Rome's founding became the most familiar version in modern-era literature. The Twelve Caesars by Suetonius is a primary source for imperial biography. Among Imperial historians who wrote in Greek are Dionysius of Halicarnassus, Josephus, and Cassius Dio. Other major Greek authors of the Empire include the biographer Plutarch, the geographer Strabo, and the rhetorician and satirist Lucian.

From the 2nd to the 4th centuries, Christian authors were in active dialogue with the classical tradition. Tertullian was one of the earliest prose authors with a distinctly Christian voice. After the conversion of Constantine, Latin literature is dominated by the Christian perspective. In the late 4th century, Jerome produced the Latin translation of the Bible that became authoritative as the Vulgate. Around that same time, Augustine wrote The City of God against the Pagans, considered "a masterpiece of Western culture".

In contrast to the unity of Classical Latin, the literary esthetic of late antiquity has a tessellated quality. A continuing interest in the religious traditions of Rome prior to Christian dominion is found into the 5th century, with the Saturnalia of Macrobius and The Marriage of Philology and Mercury of Martianus Capella. Latin poets of late antiquity include Ausonius, Prudentius, Claudian, and Sidonius Apollinaris.

== Religion ==
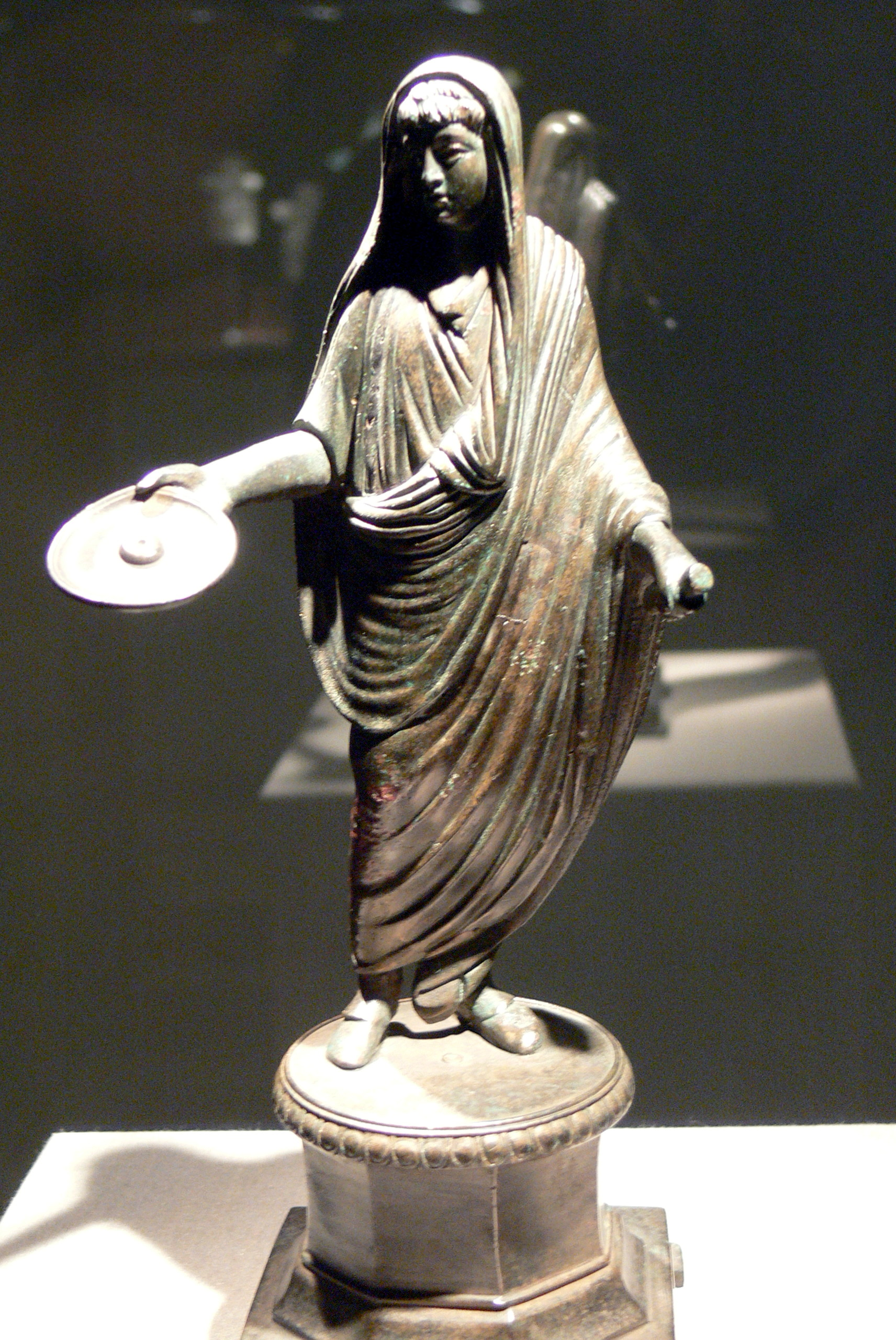
A Roman priest, his head ritually covered with a fold of his toga, extends a patera in a gesture of libation (2nd–3rd century)

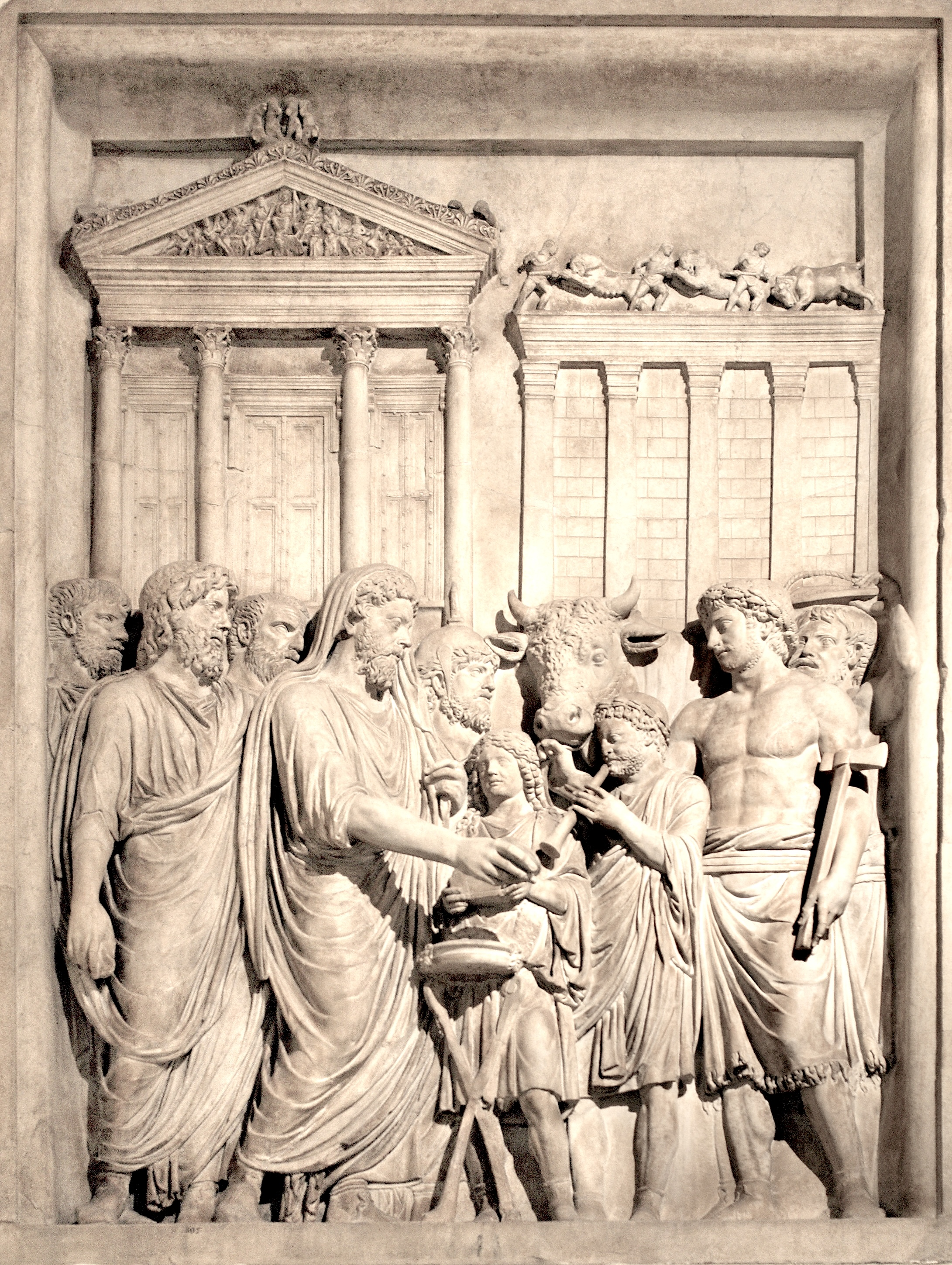
The emperor Marcus Aurelius sacrificing at the Temple of Jupiter

The Romans thought of themselves as highly religious, and attributed their success to their collective piety (pietas) and good relations with the gods (pax deorum). The archaic religion believed to have come from the earliest kings of Rome was the foundation of the mos maiorum, "the way of the ancestors", central to Roman identity.

Roman religion was practical and contractual, based on the principle of do ut des, "I give that you might give". Religion depended on knowledge and the correct practice of prayer, ritual, and sacrifice, not on faith or dogma, although Latin literature preserves learned speculation on the nature of the divine. For ordinary Romans, religion was a part of daily life. Each home had a household shrine to offer prayers and libations to the family's domestic deities. Neighbourhood shrines and sacred places such as springs and groves dotted the city. The Roman calendar was structured around religious observances; as many as 135 days were devoted to religious festivals and games (ludi).

In the wake of the Republic's collapse, state religion adapted to support the new regime. Augustus justified one-man rule with a vast programme of religious revivalism and reform. Public vows now were directed at the wellbeing of the emperor. So-called "emperor worship" expanded on a grand scale the traditional veneration of the ancestral dead and of the Genius, the divine tutelary of every individual. Upon death, an emperor could be made a state divinity (divus) by vote of the Senate. The Roman imperial cult, influenced by Hellenistic ruler cult, became one of the major ways Rome advertised its presence in the provinces and cultivated shared cultural identity. Cultural precedent in the Eastern provinces facilitated a rapid dissemination of Imperial cult, extending as far as Najran, in present-day Saudi Arabia. (Note: The caesareum at Najaran was possibly known later as the "Kaaba of Najran") Rejection of the state religion became tantamount to treason.

The Romans are known for the great number of deities they honoured. As the Romans extended their territories, their general policy was to promote stability among diverse peoples by absorbing local deities and cults rather than eradicating them, (Note: "This mentality," notes John T. Koch, "lay at the core of the genius of cultural assimilation which made the Roman Empire possible"; entry on "Interpretatio romana," in Celtic Culture: A Historical Encyclopedia (ABC-Clio, 2006), p. 974.) building temples that framed local theology within Roman religion. Inscriptions throughout the Empire record the side-by-side worship of local and Roman deities, including dedications made by Romans to local gods. (Note: See, for instance, the altar dedicated by a Roman citizen and depicting a sacrifice conducted in the Roman manner for the Germanic goddess Vagdavercustis in the 2nd century AD.) By the height of the Empire, numerous syncretic or reinterpreted gods were cultivated, among them cults of Cybele, Isis, Epona, and of solar gods such as Mithras and Sol Invictus, found as far north as Roman Britain. Because Romans had never been obligated to cultivate one god or cult only, religious tolerance was not an issue.

Mystery religions, which offered initiates salvation in the afterlife, were a matter of personal choice, practiced in addition to one's family rites and public religion. The mysteries, however, involved exclusive oaths and secrecy, which conservative Romans viewed with suspicion as characteristic of "magic", conspiracy, and subversive activity. Thus, sporadic and sometimes brutal attempts were made to suppress religionists. In Gaul, the power of the druids was checked, first by forbidding Roman citizens to belong to the order, and then by banning druidism altogether. However, Celtic traditions were reinterpreted within the context of Imperial theology, and a new Gallo-Roman religion coalesced; its capital at the Sanctuary of the Three Gauls established precedent for Western cult as a form of Roman-provincial identity. Judaism posed difficulties for Roman policy that led at times to compromise and granting of special exemptions. Tertullian noted that Judaism, unlike Christianity, was considered a religio licita, "legitimate religion". The Jewish–Roman wars resulted from political as well as religious conflicts; the siege of Jerusalem in 70 AD led to the sacking of the Second Temple and the dispersal of Jewish political power (see Jewish diaspora).

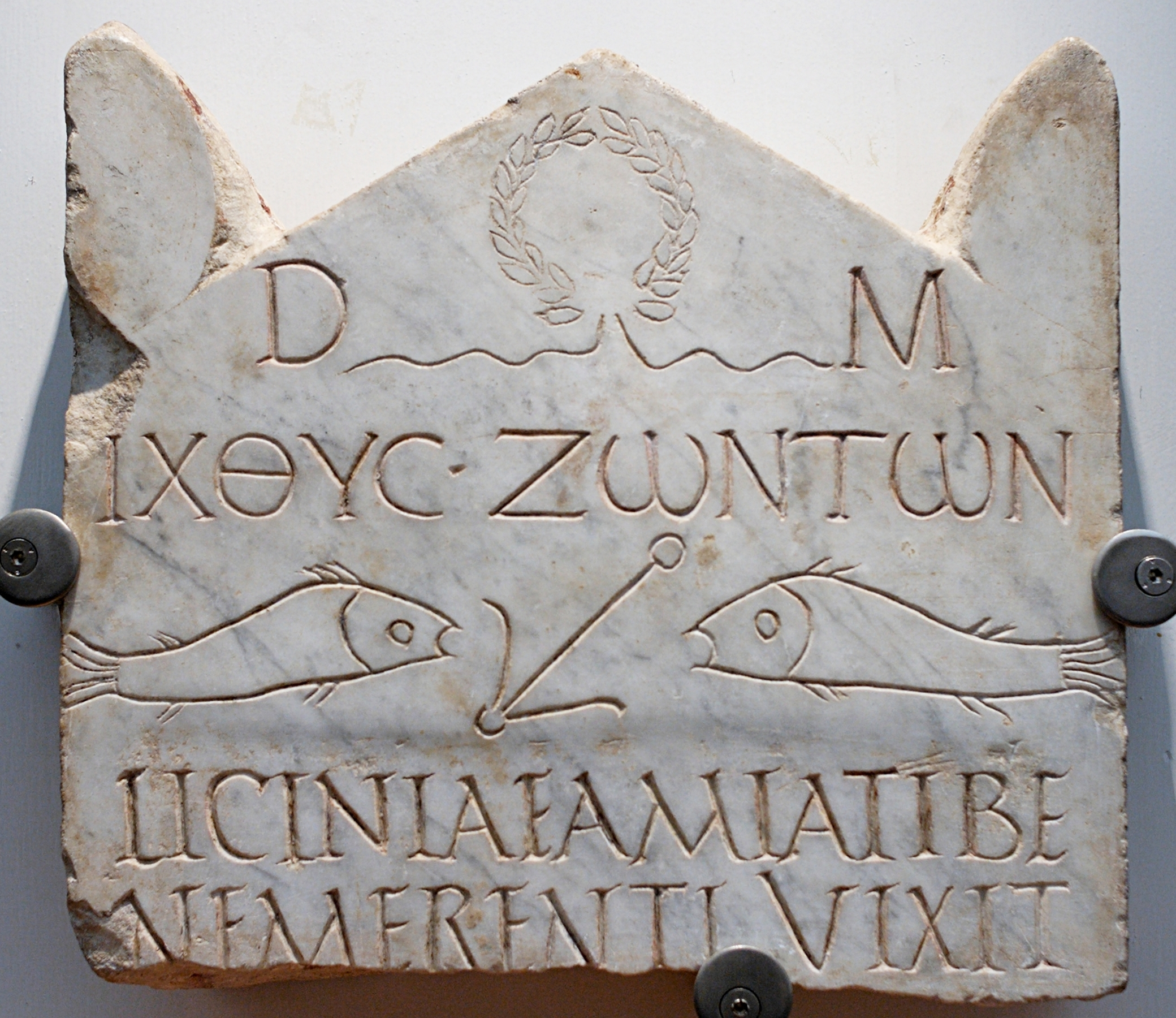
A 3rd-century funerary stele is among the earliest Christian inscriptions, written in both Greek and Latin.

Christianity emerged in Roman Judaea as a Jewish religious sect in the 1st century and gradually spread out of Jerusalem throughout the Empire and beyond. Imperially authorized persecutions were limited and sporadic, with martyrdoms occurring most often under the authority of local officials. Tacitus reports that after the Great Fire of Rome in AD 64, the emperor attempted to deflect blame from himself onto the Christians. A major persecution occurred under the emperor Domitian and a persecution in 177 took place at Lugdunum, the Gallo-Roman religious capital. A letter from Pliny the Younger, governor of Bithynia, describes his persecution and executions of Christians. The Decian persecution of 246–251 seriously threatened the Christian Church, but ultimately strengthened Christian defiance. Diocletian undertook the most severe persecution of Christians, from 303 to 311.

From the 2nd century onward, the Church Fathers condemned the diverse religions practiced throughout the Empire as "pagan". In the early 4th century, Constantine I became the first emperor to convert to Christianity. He supported the Church financially and made laws that favored it, but the new religion was already successful, having moved from less than 50,000 to over a million adherents between 150 and 250. Constantine and his successors banned public sacrifice while tolerating other traditional practices. Constantine never engaged in a purge, there were no "pagan martyrs" during his reign, and people who had not converted to Christianity remained in important positions at court. Julian attempted to revive traditional public sacrifice and Hellenistic religion, but met Christian resistance and lack of popular support.

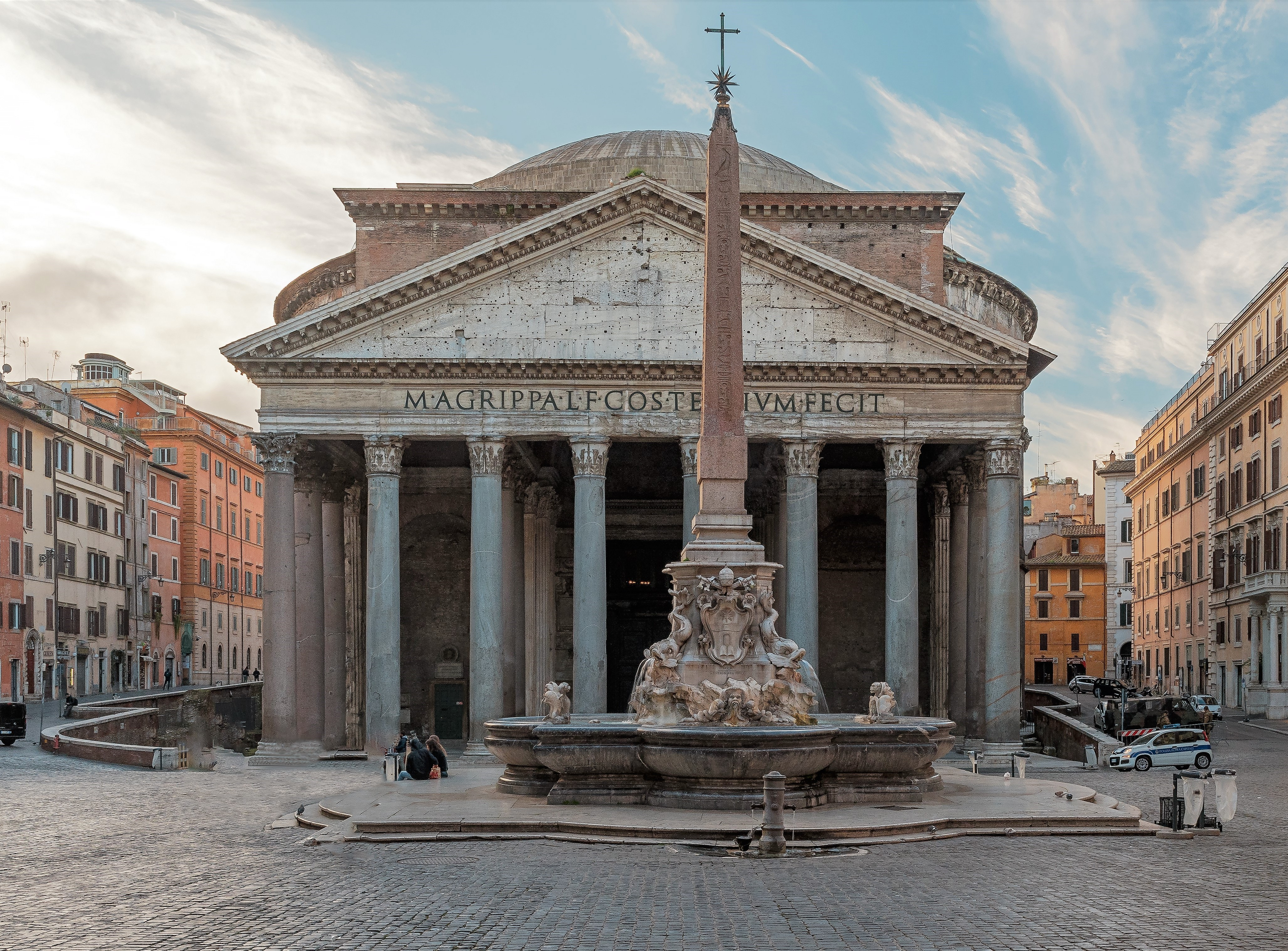
The Pantheon in Rome, a Roman temple originally built under Augustus, later converted into a Catholic church in the 7th century

Christians of the 4th century believed the conversion of Constantine showed that Christianity had triumphed over paganism (in Heaven) and little further action besides such rhetoric was necessary. Thus, their focus shifted towards heresy. According to Peter Brown, "In most areas, polytheists were not molested, and apart from a few ugly incidents of local violence, Jewish communities also enjoyed a century of stable, even privileged, existence". There were anti-pagan laws, but they were not generally enforced; through the 6th century, centers of paganism existed in Athens, Gaza, Alexandria, and elsewhere.

According to recent Jewish scholarship, toleration of the Jews was maintained under Christian emperors. This did not extend to heretics: Theodosius I made multiple laws and acted against alternate forms of Christianity, and heretics were persecuted and killed by both the government and the church throughout late antiquity. Non-Christians were not persecuted until the 6th century. Rome's original religious hierarchy and ritual influenced Christian forms, and many pre-Christian practices survived in Christian festivals and local traditions.

== Legacy ==
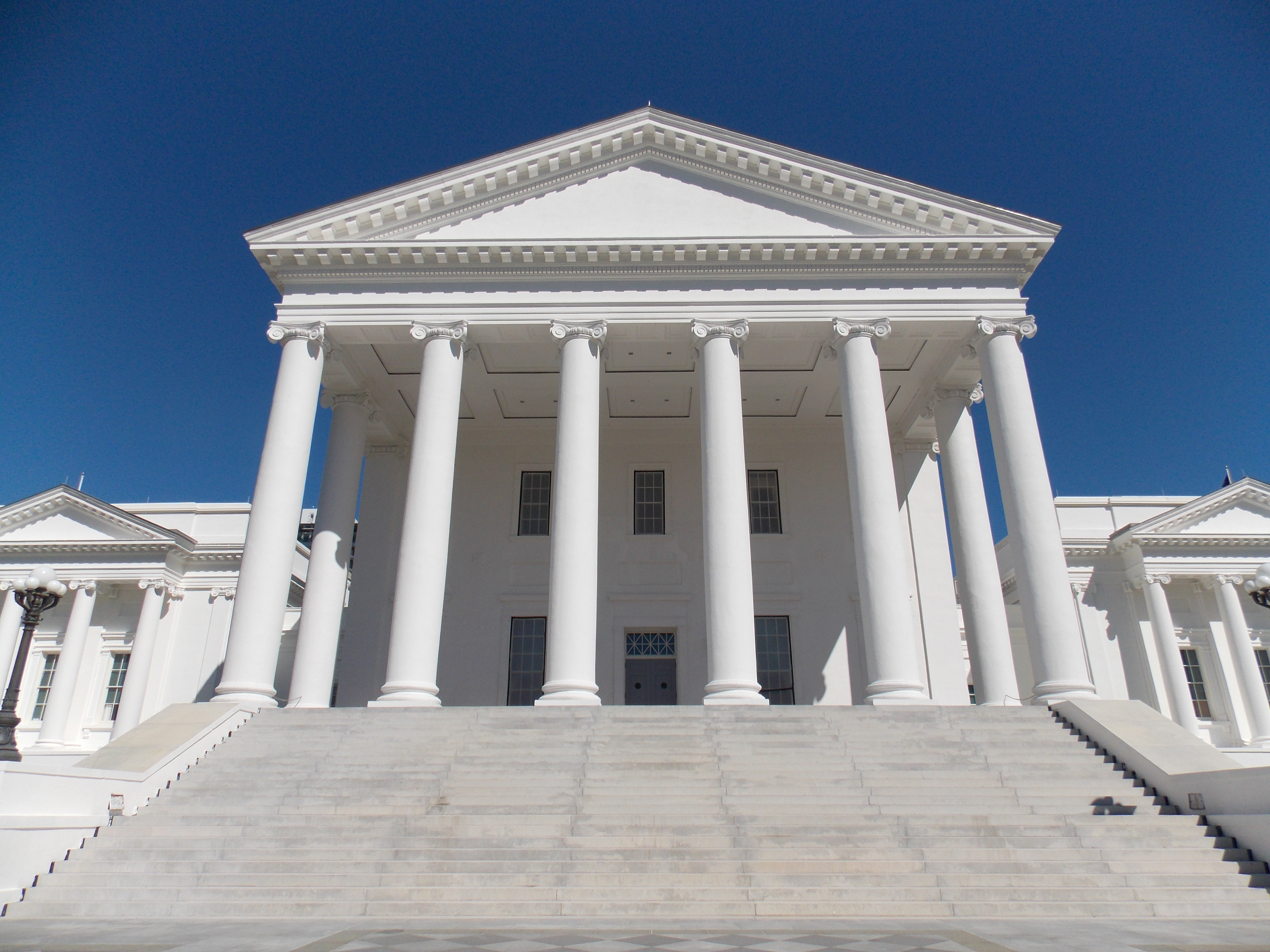
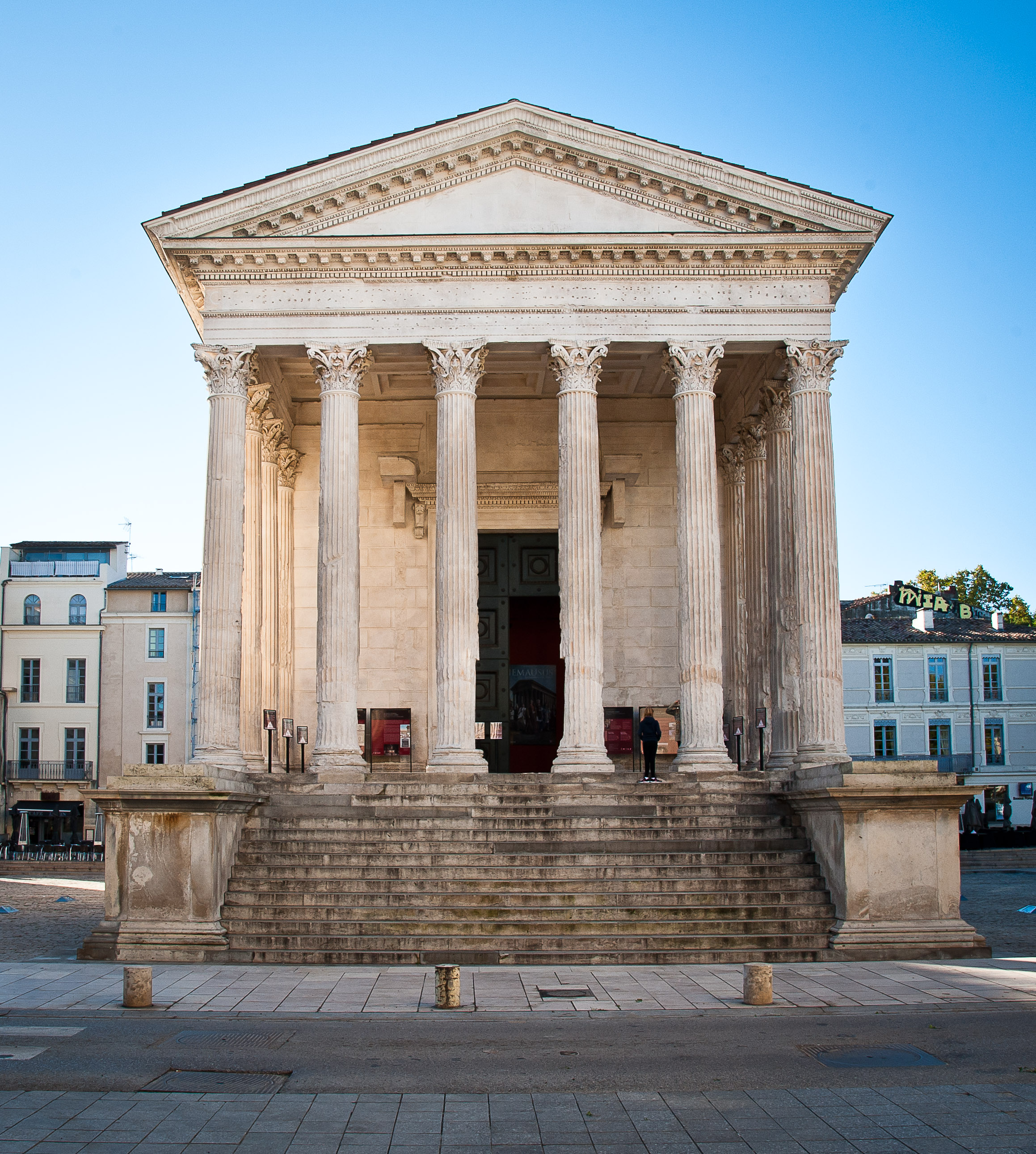
The Virginia State Capitol (left), completed in 1788, was modelled after the Maison Carrée (right), in Nîmes, France, a Roman temple built around 16 BC under Augustus.

Several states claimed to be the Roman Empire's successor. The Holy Roman Empire was established in 800 when Pope Leo III crowned Charlemagne as Roman emperor. The Russian Tsardom, as inheritor of the Byzantine Empire's Orthodox Christian tradition, counted itself the Third Rome (Constantinople having been the second), in accordance with the concept of translatio imperii. The last Eastern Roman titular, Andreas Palaiologos, sold the title of Emperor of Constantinople to Charles VIII of France; upon Charles' death, Palaiologos reclaimed the title and on his death granted it to Ferdinand and Isabella and their successors, who never used it. When the Ottomans took Constantinople in 1453, Mehmed II established his capital there and claimed to sit on the throne of the Roman Empire. He even launched an invasion of Otranto with the purpose of re-uniting the Empire, which was aborted by his death. In the medieval West, "Roman" came to mean the church and the Catholic Pope. The Greek form Romaioi remained attached to the Greek-speaking Christian population of the Byzantine Empire and is still used by Greeks.

The Roman Empire's control of the Italian Peninsula influenced Italian nationalism and the unification of Italy (Risorgimento) in 1861. In the United States, the founders saw Athenian democracy and Roman republicanism as models for the mixed constitution, but regarded the emperor as a figure of tyranny.

== See also ==
- Byzantine Empire under the Justinian dynasty – Period of Byzantine history from 518 to 602
- Daqin ("Great Qin") – Ancient Chinese name for the Roman Empire; see also Sino-Roman relations
- Gallo-Roman site of Sanxay – Structures in Vienne, France
- Imperial Italy – Aspect of politics in Fascist Italy
- List of political systems in France
- List of Roman dynasties
- Outline of ancient Rome

== Bibliography ==
=== Primary Sources ===
- The Digest of Justinian. Vol. 1. Translated by Charles H. Monro. CUP. 1904.
- Cassius Dio (1914–1927) [c. 230 CE]. Dio's Roman History in nine volumes (in Greek and English). Translated by Cary, Earnest; Foster, Herbert B. William Heinemann / Macmillan / G. P. Putnam's Sons / Harvard University Press. Online text at penelope.uchicago.edu.
- Gaius (1904) [c. 160 CE]. Gai Institutiones or Institutes of Roman Law by Gaius (in Lithuanian and English). Translated by Edward Poste (4th ed.). Clarendon Press. Online text at University of Grenoble-Alpes.
- Quintus Horatius Flaccus (1894) [c. 35–10 BCE]. Buckley, Theodore A. (ed.). The Works of Horace. Translated by Christopher Smart (New ed.). Harper & Brothers. Online text at The Perseus Catalog.
- Dessau, Hermann, ed. (1892). Inscriptiones Latinae Selectae (ILS). Vol. 1. Berlin: Weidmann.
- Decimus Junius Juvenalis (1928) [100–127 CE]. "The Satires of Juvenal". In Thomas E. Page; Edward Capps; William H.D. Rouse (eds.). Juvenal and Persius. LCL # 91 (in Latin and English). Translated by George G. Ramsay. William Heinemann / G. P. Putnam's Sons. Online text at Wikisource.
- Lucian (1921–2008) [c. 175 CE]. Lucian. LCL # 130. Vol. 3 of 8. Translated by Austin Morris Harmon (Reprinted ed.). Heinemann / HUP.
- Marcus Valerius Martialis (1919–1920) [86–103 CE]. Epigrams. In two volumes - LCL # 94, 95, 480 (in Latin and English). Translated by Walter C.A. Ker. William Heinemann / G. P. Putnam's Sons.
- Publius Ovidius Naso (2005) [c. 8 BCE–12 CE]. The poems of exile: Tristia and The Black Sea Letters. Translated and annotated by Peter Green. UCP. ISBN 0520242602.
- Pliny the Elder (1855–1857) [c. 77–79 CE]. Natural History. In six volumes. Translated by John Bostock; Henry Thomas Riley. Henry George Bohn. Online text at perseus.tufts.edu.
- Pliny the Younger (1915) [c. 97–112]. Letters. In two volumes - LCL # 55, 59. Translated by William Melmoth. Heinemann / Macmillan.
- Plutarch of Chaeronea (1936) [c. 100 CE]. Plutarch's Moralia in fourteen volumes. LCL # 321. Vol. X - 771E-854D. Translated by Harold North Fowler. Heinemann / HUP.

Marcus Fabius Quintilianus (1920–1996) [c. 95 CE]. Institutio Oratoria. In five volumes - LCL # 124-127, 494. Translated by Harold E. Butler (Reprinted ed.). HUP. Online text at penelope.uchicago.edu.

- Sidonius Apollinaris (1915) [c. 477 CE]. The Letters of Sidonius. Vol. 2 of 2. Translated and annotated by Ormonde M. Dalton. Clarendon Press.
- Strabo (1917–1949) [c. 7 BCE]. The Geography of Strabo in Eight Volumes. LCL # 49-50-182-196-211-223-241-267 (in Greek and English). Translated by Horace Leonard Jones. Heinemann / G. P. Putnam's Sons / HUP.
- C. Suetonius Tranquillus (1914) [121 CE]. The Lives of the Caesars. Two volumes. Translated by John C. Rolfe. William Heinemann / Macmillan. Volume 1, Volume 2. Online text at penelope.uchicago.edu.
- Publius Cornelius Tacitus (1876) [c. 98 CE]. The Life and Death of Julius Agricola. Translated by Alfred John Church; William Jackson Brodribb. Online text at Wikisource.
- —— (1876) [c. 109 CE]. Annals. Translated by Alfred John Church; William Jackson Brodribb. Online text at Wikisource.
- Tertullian, Quintus Septimius Florens (1977) [c.200 CE]. Apology / De spectaculis. Translated by Terrot R. Glover (Reprinted ed.). HUP. Online text at tertullian.org. ISBN 0674992768.
- Virgil (2017) [c. 19 BCE]. Virgil's Aeneid. Translated by John Dryden. CreateSpace Independent Publishing Platform. Online text at the Internet Classics Archivve. ISBN 978-1977954657.

=== Secondary Sources ===
- Abbott, Frank Frost (1901). A History and Description of Roman Political Institutions. Ginn. OCLC 1069567291.
- Adams, James Noel (May 2003). "'Romanitas' and the Latin Language". Classical Quarterly. 53 (1): 184–205. doi:10.1093/cq/53.1.184.
- Albrecht, Michael von (1997). A History of Roman Literature: From Livius Andronicus to Boethius : with Special Regard to Its Influence on World Literature. Vol. 2. Brill. ISBN 978-9-0041-0709-0.
- Ando, Clifford (2000). Imperial Ideology and Provincial Loyalty in the Roman Empire. UCP. ISBN 0520220676.
- Auguet, Roland (2012) [1970]. Cruelty and Civilization: The Roman Games (Reprinted ed.). Routledge. ISBN 978-0415104524.
- Bennett, Julian (1997). Trajan: Optimus Princeps. A Life and Times. IUP. ISBN 0253332168.
- Bohec, Yann Le (2001) [1989]. The Imperial Roman Army. Translated by Raphael Bate. Routledge. ISBN 0415222958.
- Bowersock, Glen Warren; Brown, Peter; Grabar, Oleg, eds. (1999). Late Antiquity: A Guide to the Postclassical World. HUP. ISBN 9780674511736.
- Bowman, Alan K.; Garnsey, Peter; Rathbone, Dominic, eds. (2000). The Cambridge Ancient History. Vol. 11 - The High Empire, A.D. 70–192 (2nd ed.). CUP. ISBN 9780521263351.
- Bowman, Alan K.; Garnsey, Peter; Cameron, Averil, eds. (2005). The Cambridge Ancient History. Vol. 12 - The Crisis of Empire, A.D. 193–337 (2nd ed.). CUP. ISBN 0521301998.
- Bradley, Keith (2002) [1994]. Slavery and Society at Rome (Reprinted ed.). CUP. ISBN 0521378877.
- Bury, John Bagnall (1958) [1923]. History of the Later Roman Empire. From the Death of Theodosius I to the Death of Justiniaf. Vol. 1 of 2. Dover. Online text of Ch. 9 at penelope.uchicago.edu.
- Cavallo, Guglielmo; Chartier, Roger, eds. (2003) [1995]. A History of Reading in the West. Translated by Lydia G. Cochrane. UMP. ISBN 1558494111.
- Clarke, John R. (1991). The Houses of Roman Italy, 100 B.C.-A.D. 250: Ritual, Space, and Decoration. UCP. ISBN 0520084292.
- Dickey, Eleanor (2023). Latin Loanwords in Ancient Greek: A Lexicon and Analysis (1st ed.). CUP. doi:10.1017/9781108888387. ISBN 9781108897341. S2CID 258920619.
- Dickie, Matthew W. (2003) [2001]. Magic and Magicians in the Greco-Roman World. Routledge. ISBN 0415311292.
- Dunbabin, Katherine M.D. (2006) [1999]. Mosaics of the Greek and Roman World. CUP. ISBN 9780521002301.
- Duncan-Jones, Richard (1994). Money and Government in the Roman Empire. CUP. ISBN 0521441927.
- Dyson, Stephen L. (2010). Rome: A Living Portrait of an Ancient City. JHUP. ISBN 9780801892547.
- Edmondson, J.C. (1996). "Dynamic Arenas: Gladiatorial Presentations in the City of Rome and the Construction of Roman Society during the Early Empire". In William J. Slater (ed.). Roman Theater and Society. E. Togo Salmon Papers I. UMP. ISBN 0472107216.
- Edwards, Catharine (2007). Death in Ancient Rome. YUP. ISBN 9780300112085.
- Elsner, Jaś; Huskinson, Janet, eds. (2011). Life, Death and Representation: Some New Work on Roman Sarcophagi. Walter de Gruyter. ISBN 9783110202137.
- Freeman, Charles (2000) [1999]. The Greek achievement: the Foundation of the Western World. Penguin Books. ISBN 9780140293234.
- Frier, Bruce W.; McGinn, Thomas A. (2004). A Casebook on Roman Family Law. OUP. ISBN 9780195161854.
- Fuhrmann, Christopher J. (2012). Policing the Roman Empire: Soldiers, Administration, and Public Order. OUP. ISBN 9780199737840.
- Gagarin, Michael, ed. (2010). The Oxford Encyclopedia of Ancient Greece and Rome. In 7 volumes. OUP. ISBN 9780195170726.
- Gazda, Elaine K. (1991). "Introduction". In Elaine K. Gazda; Anne E. Haeckl (eds.). Roman Art in the Private Sphere: Architecture and Décor of the Domus, Villa, and Insula. UMP. ISBN 0472083147.
- Gibbon, Edward (1836) [1776–1789]. The History of the Decline and Fall of the Roman Empire. (4 volumes). Annotations by Henry Hart Milman. Harper & Brothers. Online edition at Project Gutenberg.
- Goldhill, Simon (31 January 2024). "Latin Literature and Greek". In Gibson, Roy; Whitton, Christopher (eds.). The Cambridge Critical Guide to Latin Literature. Cambridge and New York: Cambridge University Press. pp. 847–906. ISBN 978-1-108-36330-3.
- Goldsworthy, Adrian Keith (2003). The Complete Roman Army (PDF). Thames & Hudson. ISBN 9780500051245.
- Goldsworthy, Adrian Keith (2009). How Rome Fell: Death of a Superpower. YUP. ISBN 9780300137194.
- Gowers, Emily (2003) [1993]. The Loaded Table: Representation of Food in Roman Literature. OUP. ISBN 0198150822.
- Greene, Kevin (1990). The Archaeology of the Roman Economy. UCP. ISBN 0520074017.
- Habinek, Thomas N. (2005). The World of Roman Song: From Ritualized Speech to Social Order. JHUP. ISBN 0801881056.
- Harris, William V. (1989). Ancient Literacy. HUP. ISBN 0674033817.
- Harper, Kyle (2019). The Fate of Rome - Climate, Disease, and the End of an Empire. PUP. ISBN 9780691192062.
- Harris, William V. (1999). "Demography, Geography and the Sources of Roman Slaves". The Journal of Roman Studies. 89: 62–75. doi:10.2307/300734. JSTOR 300734. S2CID 162766304.
- Harris, William V., ed. (2010). The Monetary Systems of the Greeks and Romans. OUP. ISBN 9780199586714.
- Hekster, Olivier; Kaizer, Ted, eds. (2011). Frontiers in the Roman World. Proceedings of the Ninth Workshop of the International Network Impact of Empire (Durham, 16–19 April 2009). Brill. ISBN 9789004201194.
- Holleran, Claire (2012). Shopping in Ancient Rome: The Retail Trade in the Late Republic and the Principate. OUP. ISBN 9780199698219.
- Hornblower, Simon; Spawforth, Antony, eds. (1999). The Oxford Classical Dictionary (3rd ed.). OUP. ISBN 019866172X.
- Humphrey, John H. (1986). Roman Circuses: Arenas for Chariot Racing. UCP. ISBN 0520049217.
- Johnson, William A.; Parker, Holt N., eds. (2009). Ancient Literacies: The Culture of Reading in Greece and Rome. OUP. ISBN 9780195340150.
- Johnson, William A. (2010). Readers and Reading Culture in the High Roman Empire: A Study of Elite Communities. OUP. ISBN 9780195176407.
- Jones, Arnold H.M. (1960). "The Cloth Industry Under the Roman Empire". Economic History Review. 13 (2): 183–192. JSTOR 2591177.
- Jones, R. F. J.; Bird, D. G. (November 1972). "Roman Gold-Mining in North-West Spain, II: Workings on the Rio Duerna". Journal of Roman Studies. 62: 59–74. doi:10.2307/298927. JSTOR 298927. S2CID 162096359.
- Junkelmann, Marcus (2000). Das Spiel mit dem Tod. So kämpften Roms Gladiatoren (in German). Mainz: Philipp von Zabern Verlag. ISBN 3805325630.
- Kelly, Christopher (2006). The Roman Empire: A Very Short Introduction. OUP. ISBN 9780192803917.
- Kousser, Rachel Meredith (2008). Hellenistic and Roman Ideal Sculpture: The Allure of the Classical. CUP. ISBN 9780521877824.
- Laes, Christian (2011) [2006]. Children in the Roman Empire: Outsiders Within. CUP. ISBN 9780521897464.
- Liu, Jinyu (2009). Collegia Centonariorum: The Guilds of Textile Dealers in the Roman West. Brill. ISBN 9789004177741.
- McClelland, John (2007). Body and Mind: Sport in Europe from the Roman Empire to the Renaissance. Routledge. ISBN 9780714653570.
- McGinn, Thomas A.J. (2003) [1998]. Prostitution, Sexuality and the Law in Ancient Rome. OUP. ISBN 0195161327.
- Marshall, Anthony J. (Autumn 1976). "Library Resources and Creative Writing at Rome". Phoenix. 30 (3): 252–264. doi:10.2307/1087296. JSTOR 1087296.
- Métraux, Guy P.R. (2008). "Prudery and Chic in Late Antique Clothing". In Edmondson, Jonathan; Keith, Alison (eds.). Roman Dress and the Fabrics of Roman Culture. UTP. ISBN 9780802093196.
- Millar, Fergus (November 1983). "Empire and City, Augustus to Julian: Obligations, Excuses and Status". Journal of Roman Studies. 73: 76–96. doi:10.2307/300073. JSTOR 300073. S2CID 159799017.
- Morris, Ian; Scheidel, Walter, eds. (2009). The Dynamics of Ancient Empires: State Power from Assyria to Byzantium. OUP. ISBN 9780195371581.
- Naerebout, Frederick G. (2009). "Dance in the Roman Empire and Its Discontents". In Hekster, Olivier; Schmidt-Hofner, Sebastian; Witschel, Christian (eds.). Ritual Dynamics and Religious Change in the Roman Empire. Proceedings of the Eighth Workshop of the International Network Impact of Empire (Heidelberg, 5-7 July 2007). Brill. pp. 143–158. ISBN 9789004174818.
- Nicolet, Claude (1991). Space, Geography, and Politics in the Early Roman Empire. University of Michigan Press. ISBN 0472100963.
- Nicolle, David (2000). Constantinople 1453: The End of Byzantium. Osprey Publishing. ISBN 1841760919.
- Peachin, Michael, ed. (2011). The Oxford Handbook of Social Relations in the Roman World. OUP. ISBN 9780195188004.
- Potter, David S., ed. (2009). A Companion to the Roman Empire. Wiley. ISBN 9781405199186.
- Potter, David S.; Mattingly, David J. (1999). Life, Death, and Entertainment in the Roman Empire. UMP. ISBN 9780472085682.
- Rawson, Beryl, ed. (1992) [1987]. The Family in Ancient Rome: New Perspectives (Reprinted ed.). CUP. ISBN 0801493560.
- —— (2003). Children and Childhood in Roman Italy. OUP. ISBN 0199240345.
- Roberts, Michael John (2010) [1989]. The Jeweled Style: Poetry and Poetics in Late Antiquity. CUP. ISBN 9780801476334.
- Rochette, Bruno (2011). "Ch. 30 - Language Policies in the Roman Republic and Empire". In Clackson, James (ed.). A Companion to the Latin Language. Blackwell. doi:10.1002/9781444343397. hdl:2268/35932. ISBN 9781444343397.
- —— (January–June 2018). "Was there a Roman linguistic imperialism during the Republic and the early Principate?". Lingue e Linguaggio (1): 107–128. doi:10.1418/90426. ISSN 1720-9331.
- —— (2023). "The Attitude of the Roman Emperors towards Language Practices". In Mullen, Alex (ed.). Social Factors in the Latinization of the Roman West (1st ed.). OUP. ISBN 9780198887294.
- Rüpke, Jörg, ed. (2011) [2007]. A Companion to Roman Religion. Blackwell. ISBN 9781444339246.
- Stambaugh, John E. (1988). The Ancient Roman City. JHUP. ISBN 0801836921.
- Severy, Beth (2003). Augustus and the Family at the Birth of the Empire. Routledge. ISBN 041530959X.
- Treadgold, Warren (1997). A History of the Byzantine State and Society. Stanford University Press. ISBN 0804726302.
- Vout, Caroline (1996). "The Myth of the Toga: Understanding the History of Roman Dress". Greece and Rome. 43 (2): 204–220. doi:10.1093/gr/43.2.204.
- Wilson-Jones, Mark (2003) [2000]. Principles of Roman Architecture. YUP. ISBN 030010202X.
- Winterling, Aloys (2009). Politics and Society in Imperial Rome. Wiley-Blackwell. ISBN 9781405179690.
- Wiseman, Timothy P. (1970). "The Definition of Eques Romanus". Historia: Zeitschrift für Alte Geschichte. 19 (1): 67–83.
- Wood, Gordon S. (2011). The Idea of America: Reflections on the Birth of the United States. Penguin Publishing Group. ISBN 978-1-1015-1514-3.
