= Portrait of Terentius Neo =

Pompeiian fresco portraying a literary couple

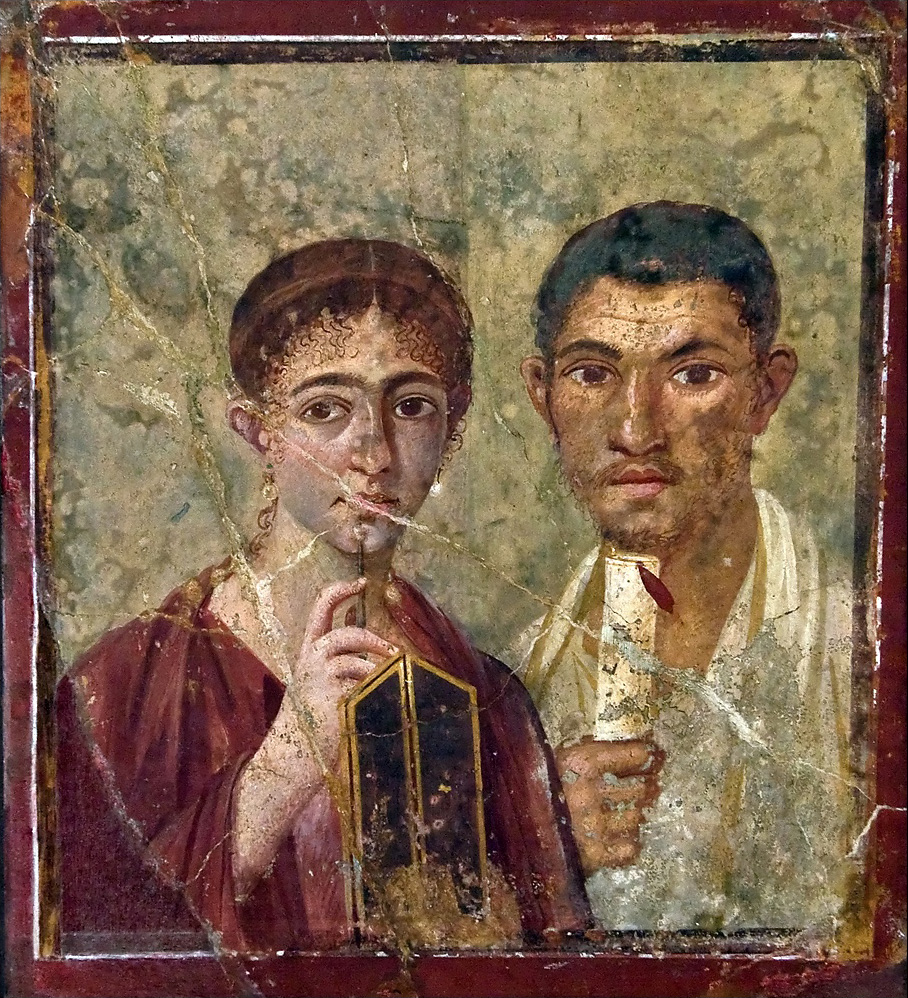
- Portrait of Terentius Neo and his wife, from Pompeii, c. AD 50
- Type: Fresco
- Period/culture: Early Imperial period
- Discovered: House of Terentius Neo; Pompeii, Campania, Italy
- Present location: National Archaeological Museum, Naples, Italy
- Culture: Roman

The Portrait of Terentius Neo is a Roman fresco, created circa 50 AD, depicting a couple holding objects important to literacy. It was found in Pompeii in the House of Terentius Neo in Regio 7, Insula 2, 6, and is now in the National Archaeological Museum, Naples.

It is highly unusual for individualized painted portraits to survive from the Roman era, but holding objects to do with literacy is common in portraits, which are mostly more idealized, and may be intended to represent authors, or real people depicted as dead authors. That does not seem to be the case here. In its original setting the portrait was underneath a smaller painting showing Cupid and Psyche in a "passionate embrace", Psyche with wings, and her buttocks mostly displayed to the viewer.

== Description ==
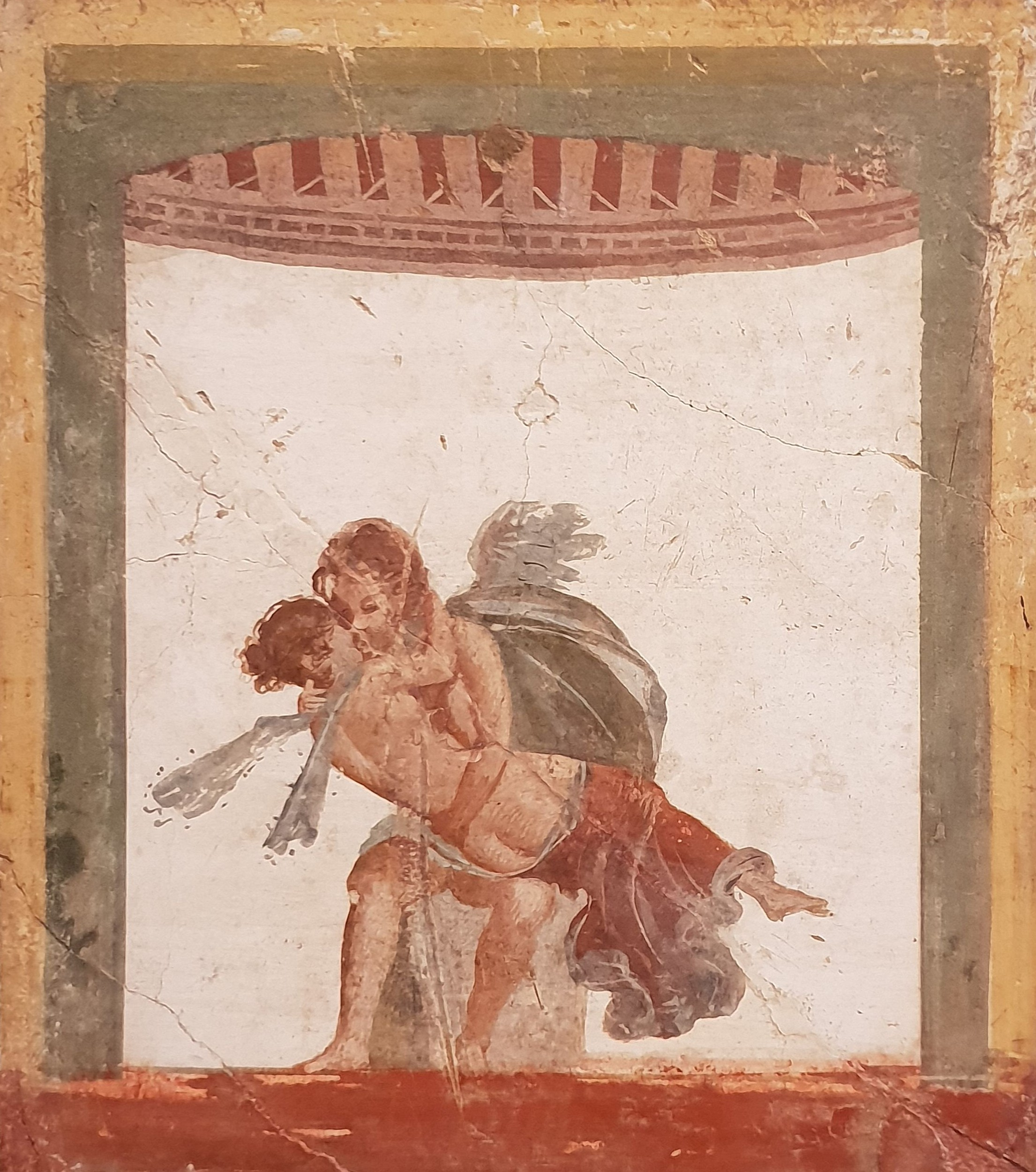
The smaller painting showing Cupid and Psyche, originally painted just above the portraits

The fresco is considered one of the finest pieces of art from the area of Vesuvius. It was sometimes erroneously called the portrait of Paquius Proculus, but this was the result of some confusion because the fresco was not found in the House of Paquius Proculus, which is in Reg I, Ins 7, 1.

An inscription found on the outside of the house is an election recommendation by Terentius Neo. The portrait is unusual in several ways: the couple is shown of equal status and are both members of a confident and fashionable mercantile class; the portrait shows realistic imperfections or peculiarities in the faces which is rare in the very few similar frescoes, though typical of Roman portrait sculpture, and brings their characters to life.

According to the museum, "The portrait represents a typical provincial bourgeois, showing off like a refined aristocrat, being portrayed with the toga and a roll of papyrus". Since bread was the staple food of Roman Italy, bakers could get very wealthy; the grandiose Tomb of Eurysaces the Baker (who was probably a freedman) in Rome comes from about a century earlier.

The pair of middle-class Pompeians are believed to be husband and wife. Terentius Neo was a bakery owner as the house had been modified to include a bakery. The man wears a toga, the mark of a Roman citizen, and holds a rotulus, suggesting he is also involved in local public or cultural events. The woman is in the foreground and holds a stylus and wax tablet, emphasizing that she is of equal status, educated, and literate.
