= Married couple funerary reliefs =

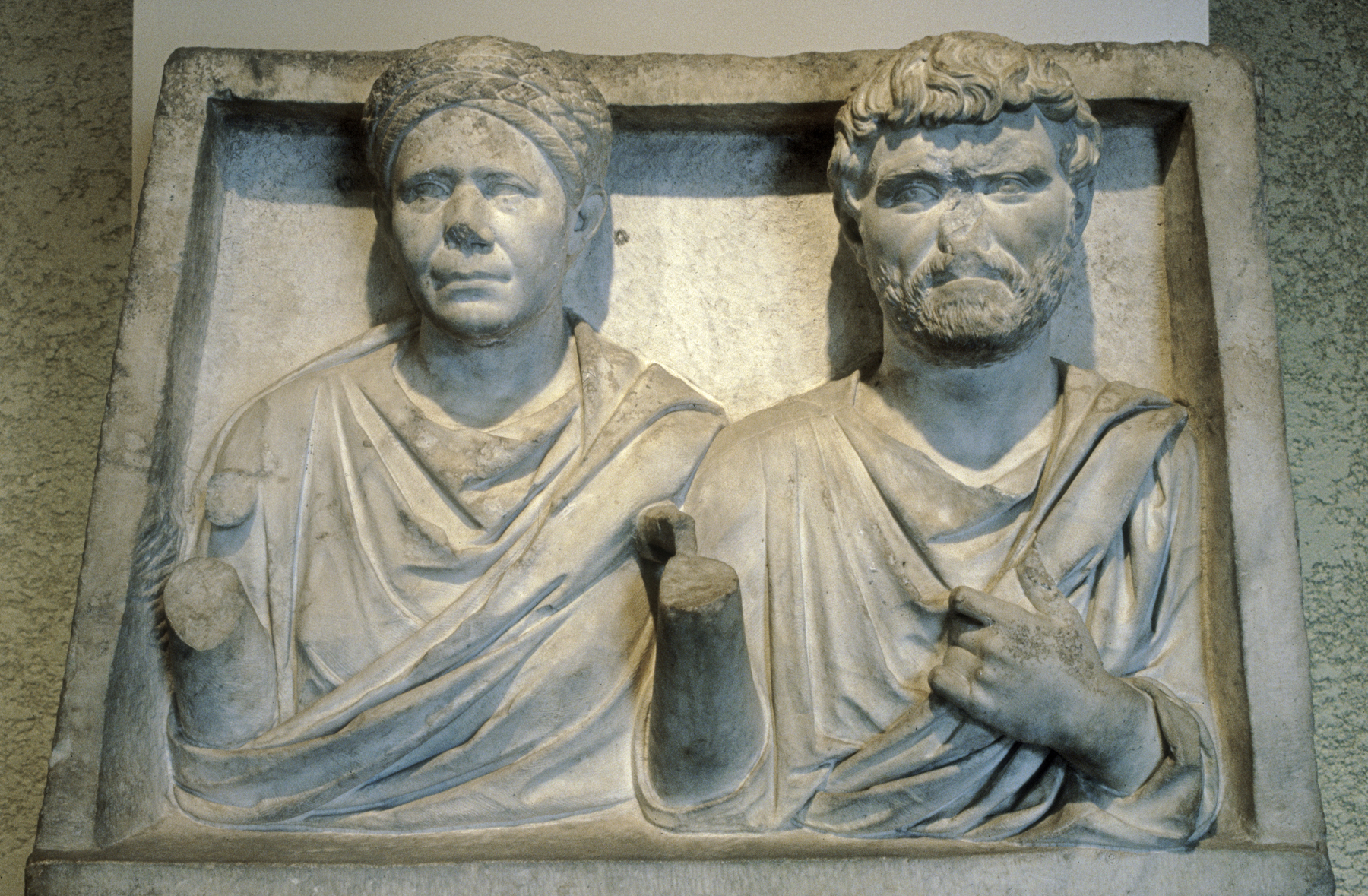
Framed grave relief, possibly from the Hadrianic or Antonine period (2nd century)

Funerary reliefs of married couples were common in Roman funerary art. They are one of the most common funerary portraits found on surviving freedmen reliefs. By the fourth century, a portrait of a couple on a sarcophagus from the empire did not necessarily signify the burial of two spouses but instead demonstrated the importance of the material bond.

== Lucius Antistius Sarculo and Antistia Plutia ==
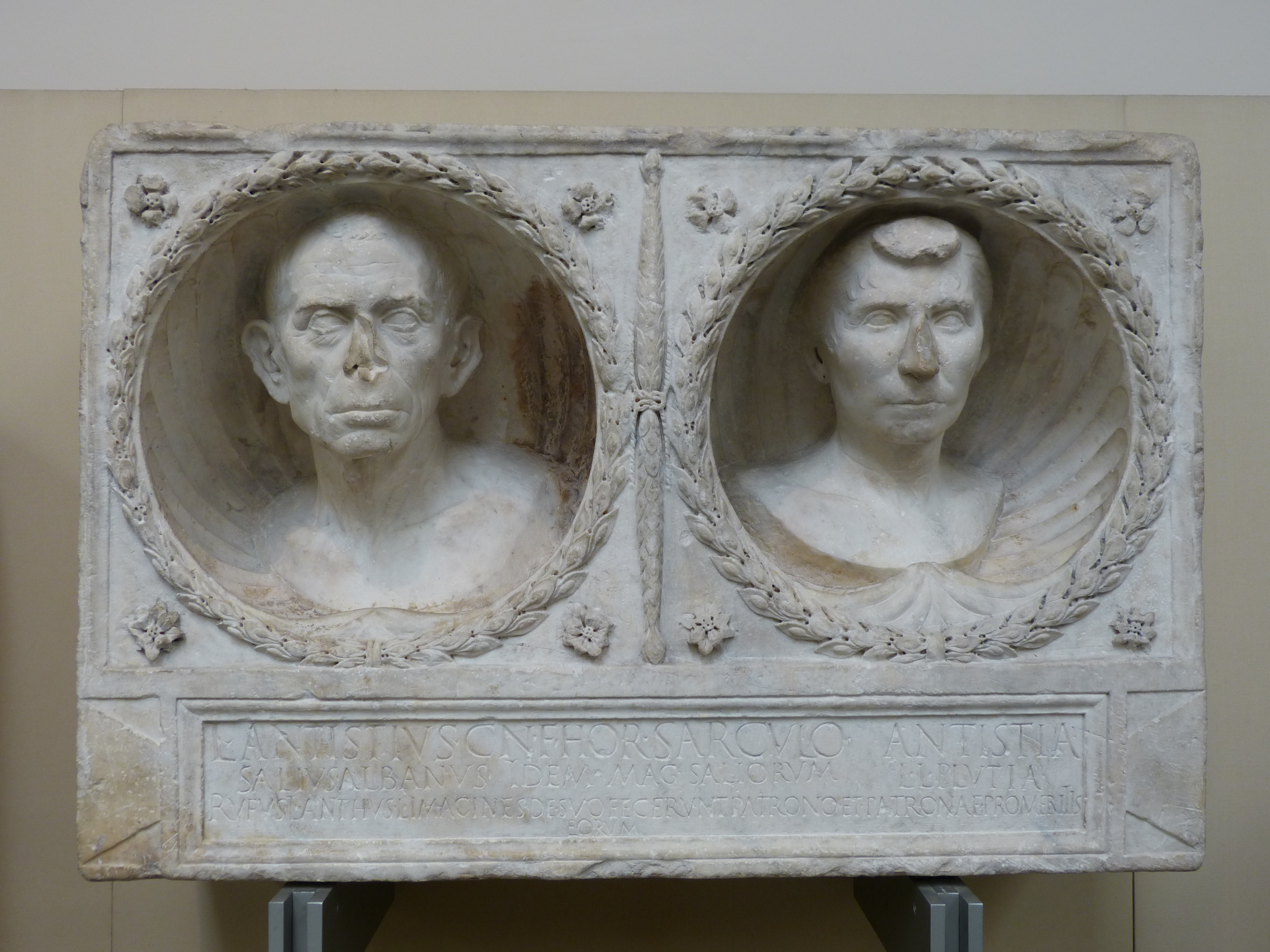
Marble funerary relief of Lucius Antistius Sarculo and his wife Antistia Plutia. Roman, about 30–10 BC. Found in Rome. GR 1858,0819.2 (Sculpture 2275)

This relief originally was part of the funerary monument of Lucius Antistius Sarculo. This relief consists of two figures: a free-born Roman priest of the Salian order, and his wife and freedwoman (former slave) Antisia Plutia.

The relief is typical of the realistic style with the lined eyes, the hollowed cheeks and the prominent ears of the Antistius, along with other characteristic. Furthermore, the couple’s hairstyles indicate a date towards the end of the first century BC. Antistius' hair is cut close to his head, emphasizing his retreating hairline. Antistia's hair, drawn back into a small bun, with some curls brought forward and a small topknot at the front of the head, follows exactly the hairstyle of the Livia, wife of Emperor Augustus (r. 27 BC – AD 14).

== Via Statilia relief ==
An example of a Late Roman Republic double portrait of a man and a woman, a husband and wife, that once decorated a tomb of the Via Statilia in Rome. The wife and husband were probably former slaves because slavery in ancient Rome was common. It has been estimated that Italy alone had about two million slaves. Some slaves gained freedom in return for their service, while other died as slaves in service of their original or new owner. As slaves, couples had no legal standing, after they had been freed former slaves became people in the eye of the law. Therefore, freedmen and freedwomen would portray themselves as married couple on their tombs.

== Other examples ==
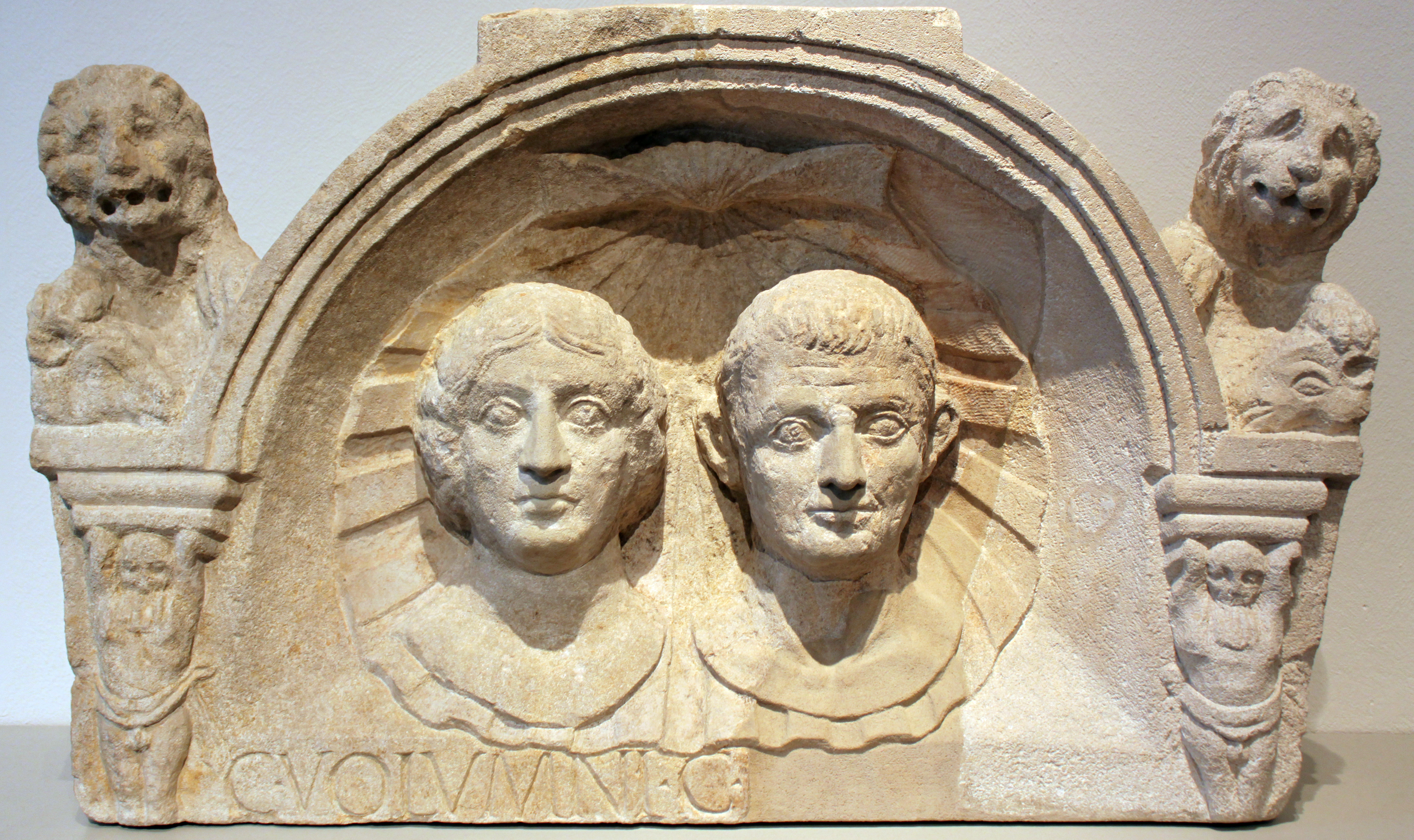
Tombstone of Gaius Volumnius and his wife; Upper Italy

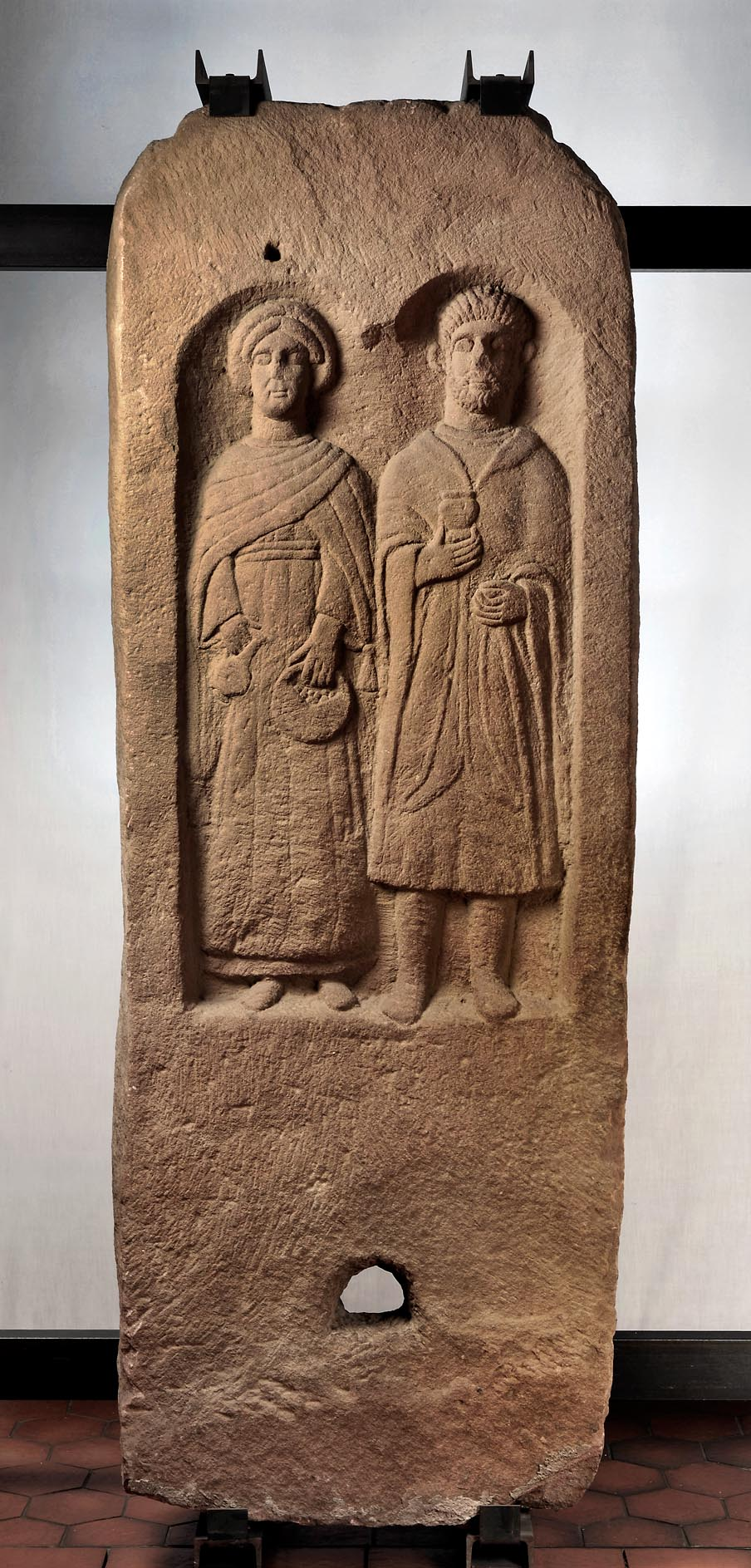
A 3rd century funeral stele of a peasant couple of Roman Gaul, found in present-day Oberhaslach

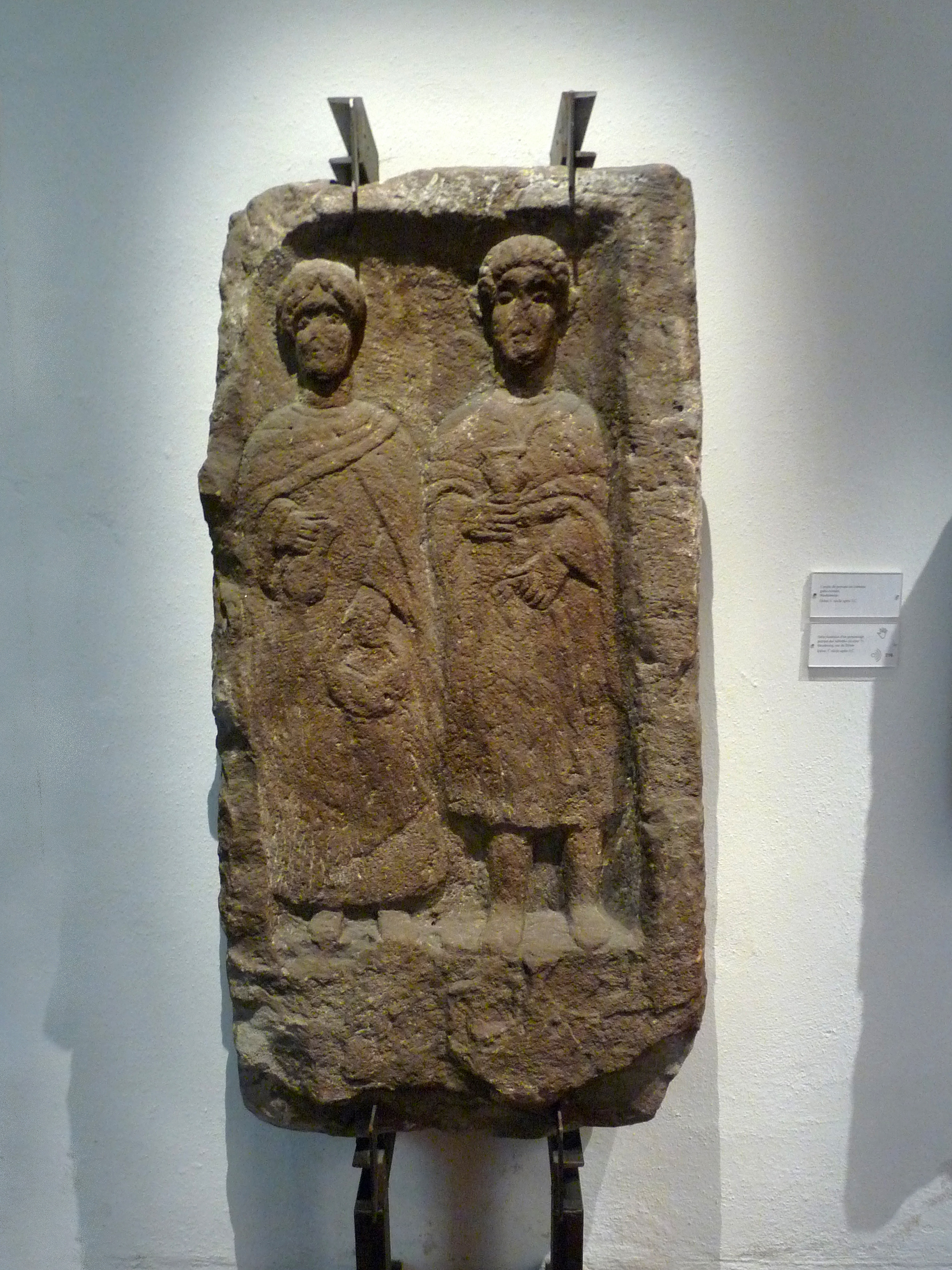
Another peasant couple in Gallo-Roman costume (4th century), found in Marlenheim

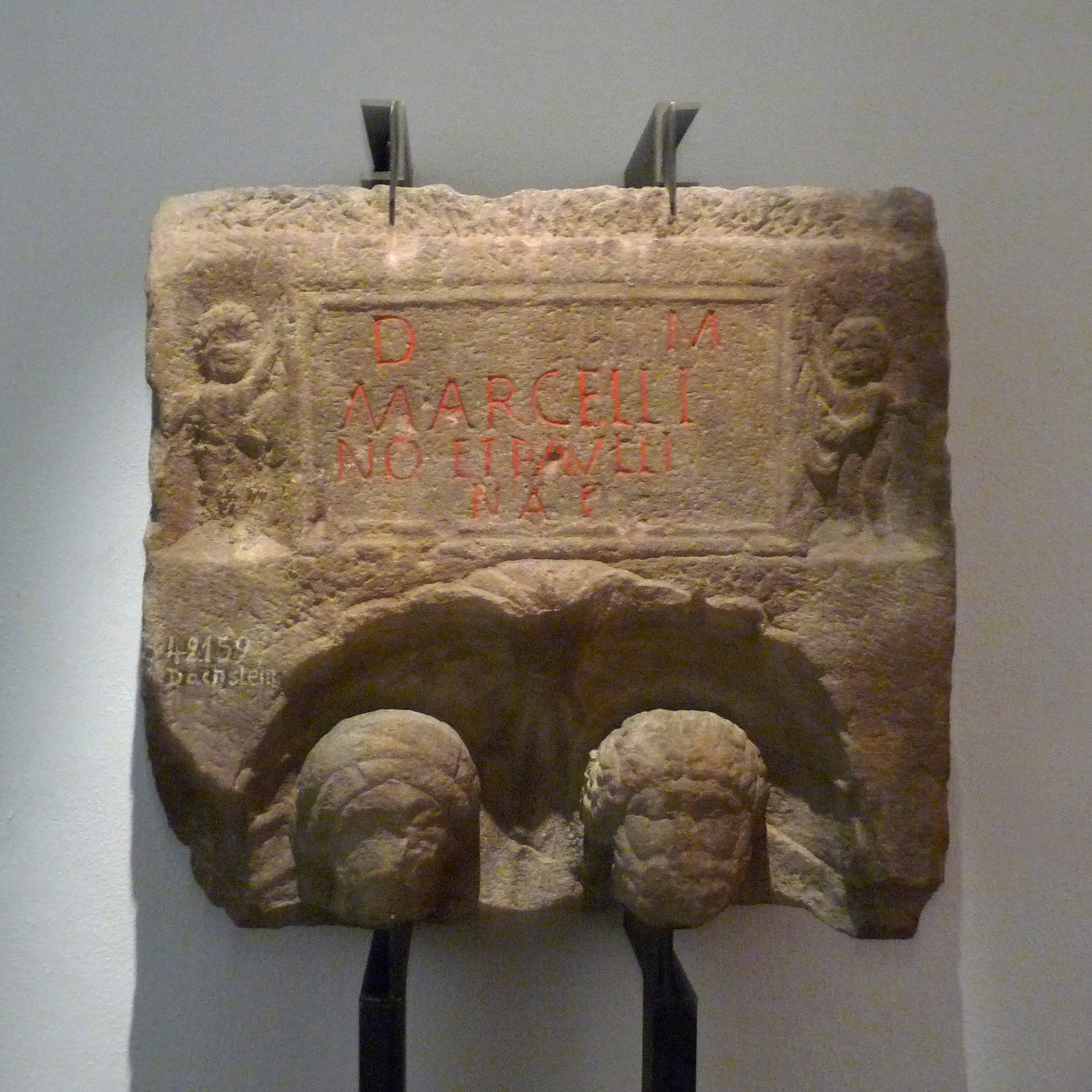
Funerary stele of a couple, with epigraphic cartridge held by two Cupids. Middle of the 3rd century. Found in Dachstein

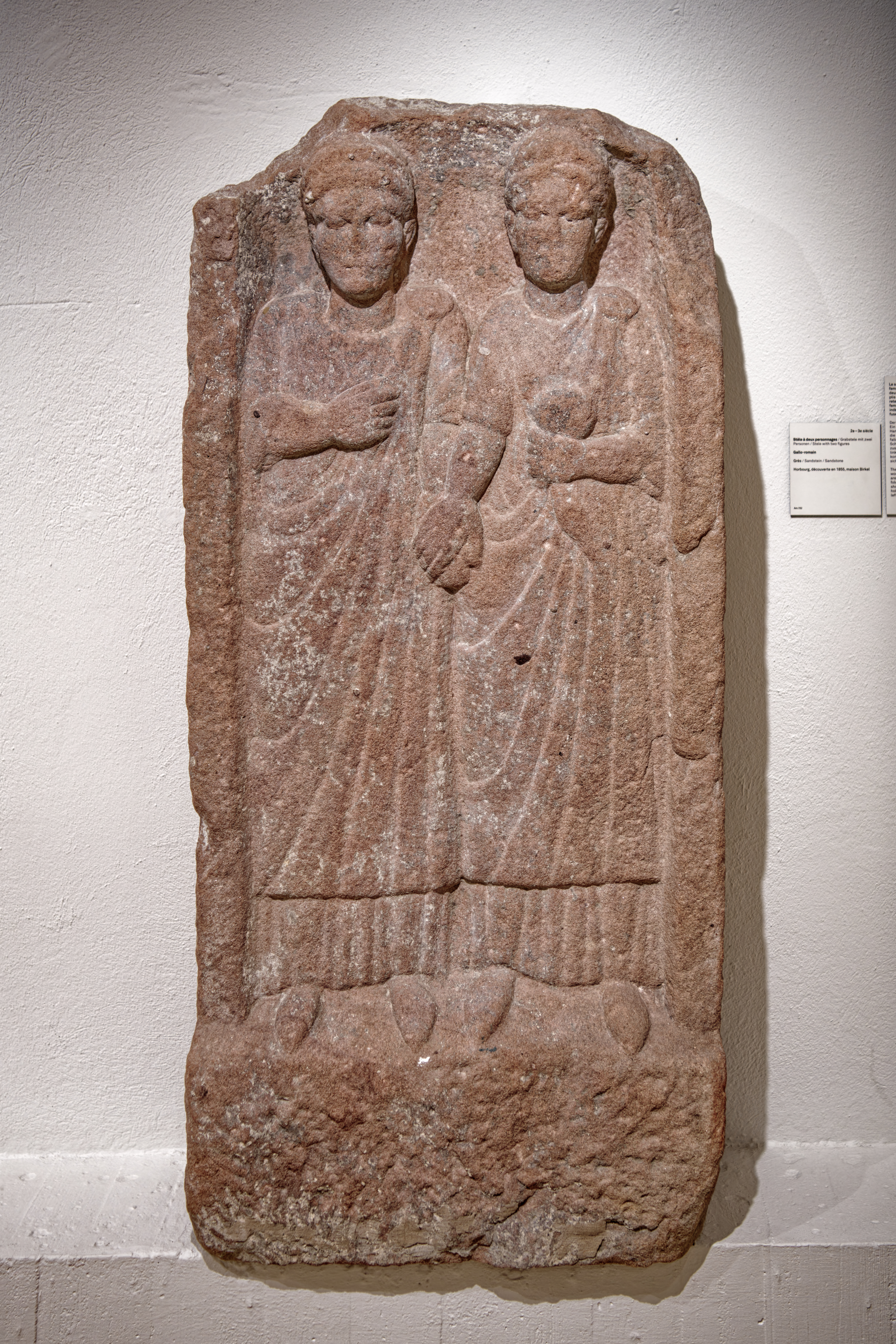
Gallo-Roman tombstone showing a couple holding hands. Found in Horbourg

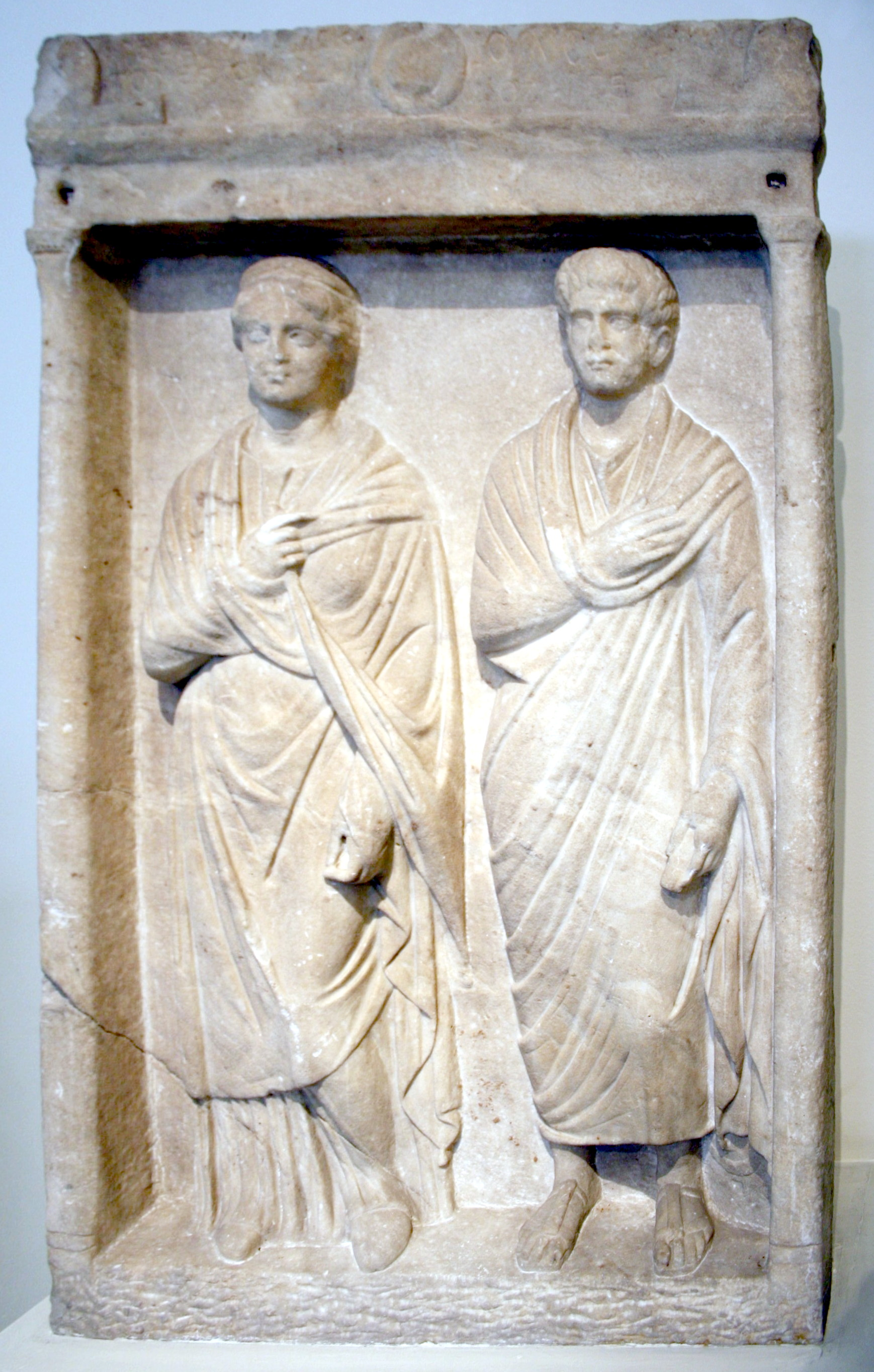
Funerary stele for a couple, dating from the period of emperor Gallienus (261–268)

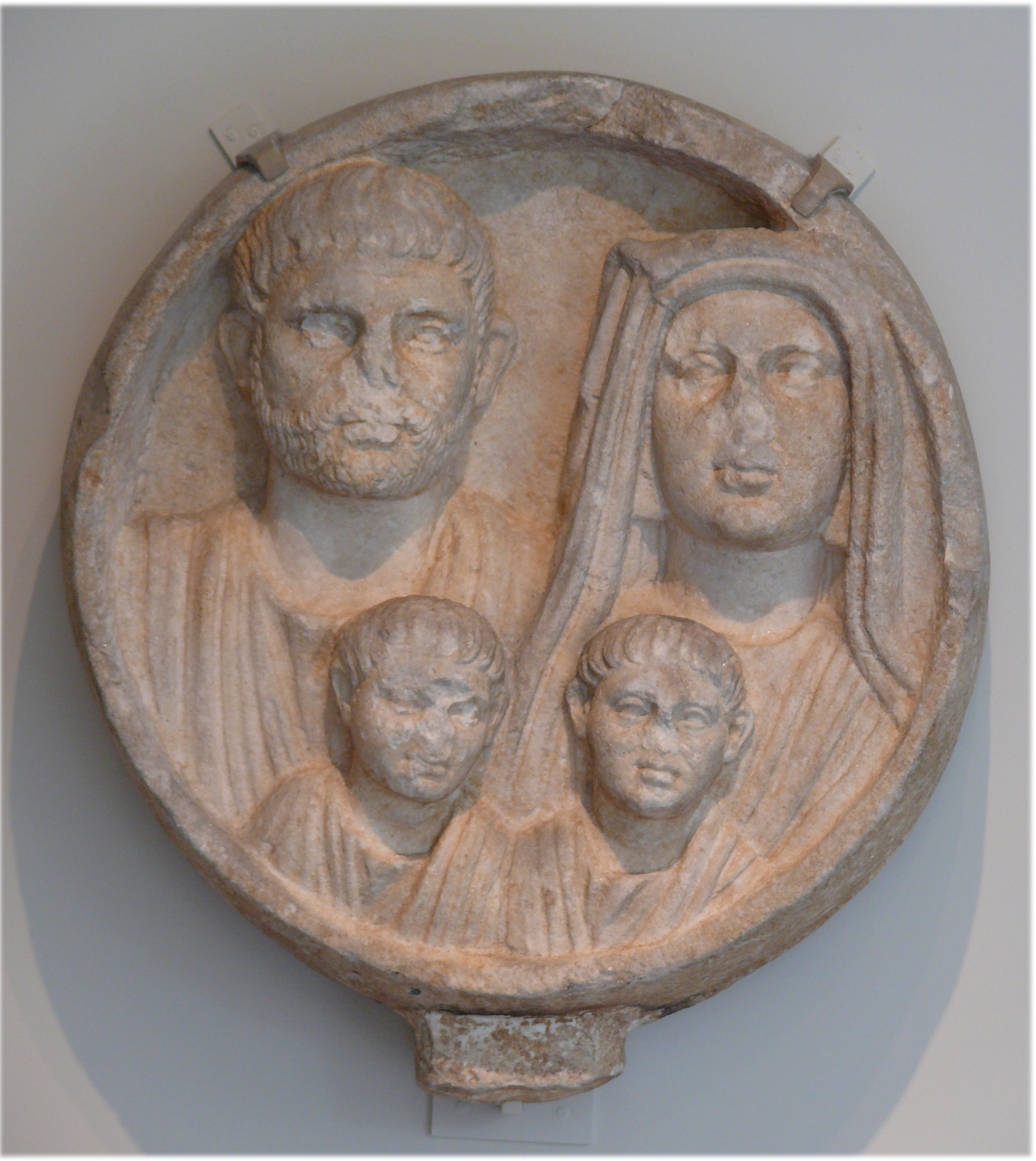
Roman funerary relief from 2nd–3rd century showing a couple and their kids
