= Education in ancient Rome =

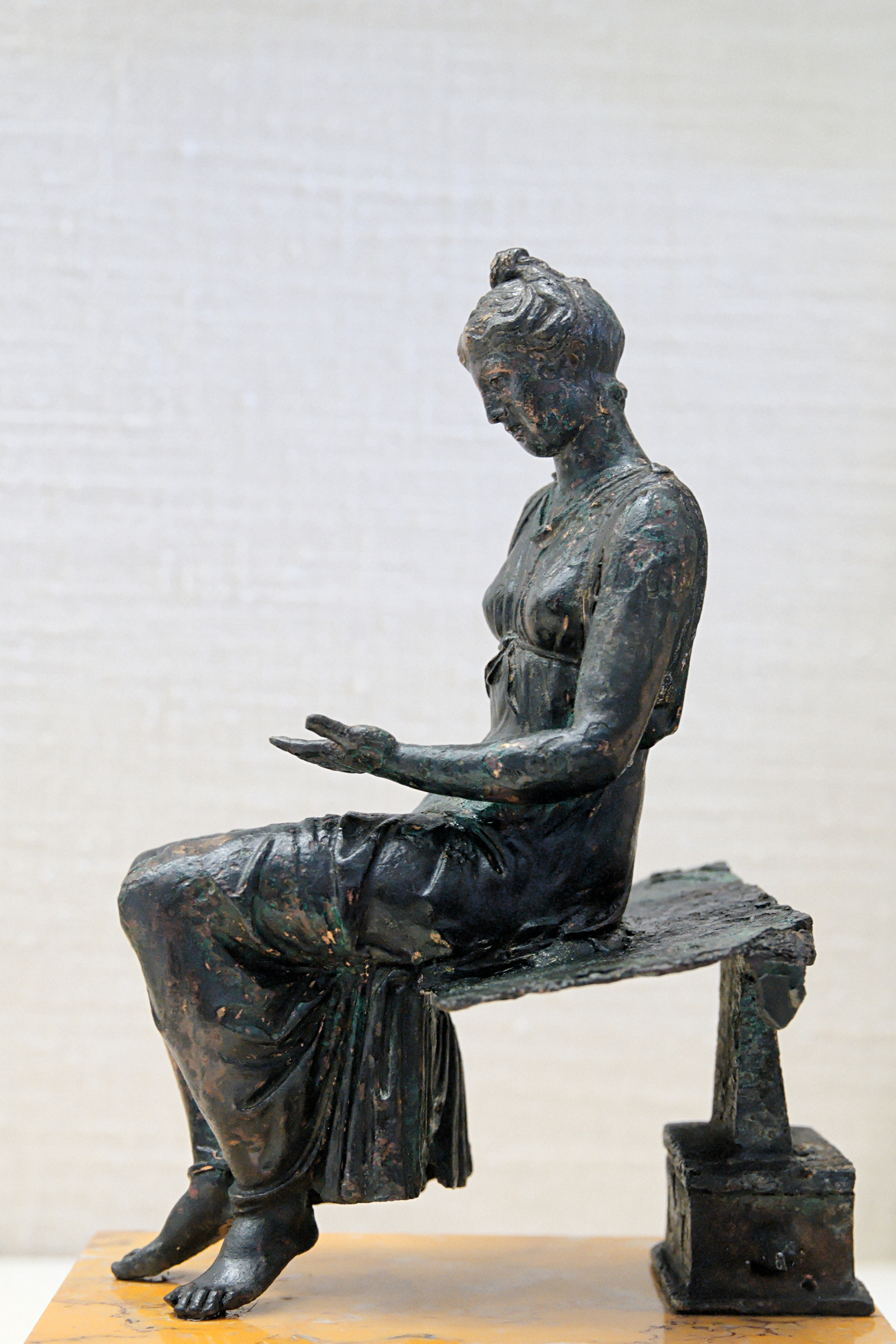
Bronze statuette of a girl reading (1st century)

Education in ancient Rome progressed from an informal, familial system of education in the early Republic to a tuition-based system during the late Republic and the Empire. The Roman education system was based on the Greek system – and many of the private tutors in the Roman system were enslaved Greeks or freedmen. The educational methodology and curriculum used in Rome was copied in its provinces and provided a basis for education systems throughout later Western civilization. Organized education remained relatively rare, and there are few primary sources or accounts of the Roman educational process until the 2nd century AD. Due to the extensive power wielded by the pater familias over Roman families, the level and quality of education provided to Roman children varied drastically from family to family; nevertheless, Roman popular morality came eventually to expect fathers to have their children educated to some extent, and a complete advanced education was expected of any Roman who wished to enter politics.

== Education during the Empire ==
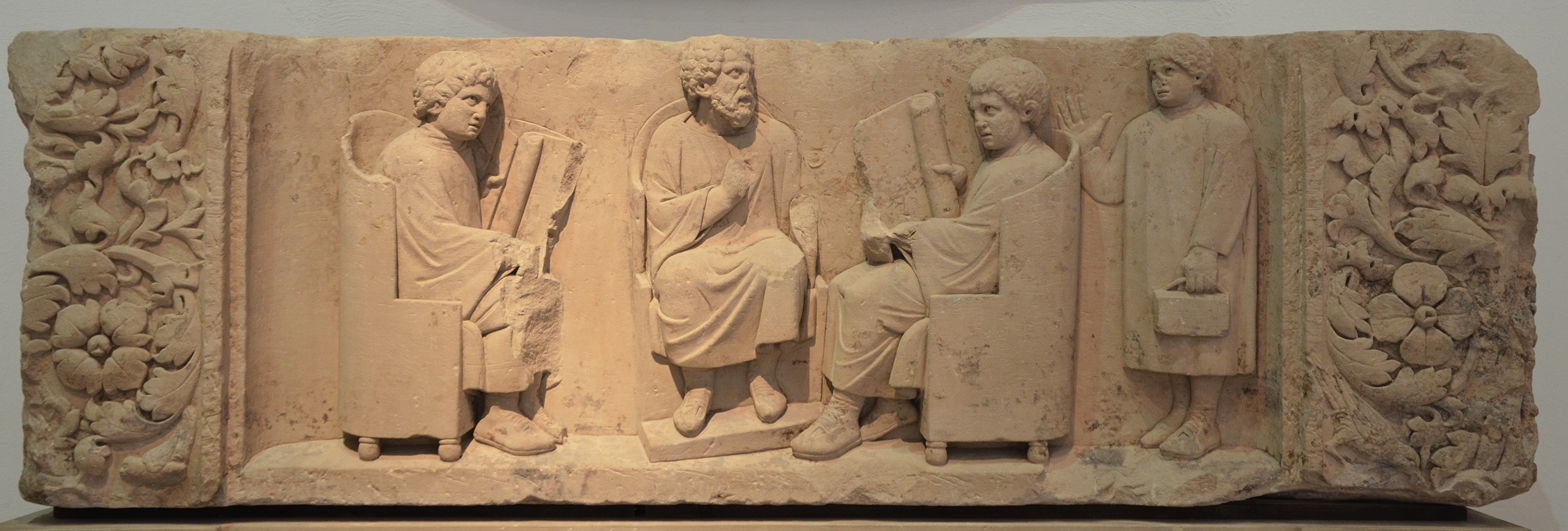
Relief found in Neumagen near Trier, a teacher with two discipuli and a puer capsarius (180-185 AD)

At the height of the Roman Republic and later the Roman Empire, the Roman system of education gradually found its final form. Formal schools were established, which serviced paying students; very little that could be described as free public education existed. Both boys and girls were educated, though not necessarily together.

In a system much like the one that predominates in the modern world, the Roman education system developed arranged schools in tiers. The educator Quintilian recognized the importance of starting education as early as possible, noting that "memory … not only exists even in small children but is specially retentive at that age". A Roman student would progress through schools just as a student today might go from primary school to secondary school and then to college. They were generally exempted from studies during the market days which formed a kind of weekend every eight days. Progression depended more on ability than age, with great emphasis being placed upon a student's ingenium or inborn "gift" for learning, and a more tacit emphasis on a student's ability to afford high-level education.

== Influences ==
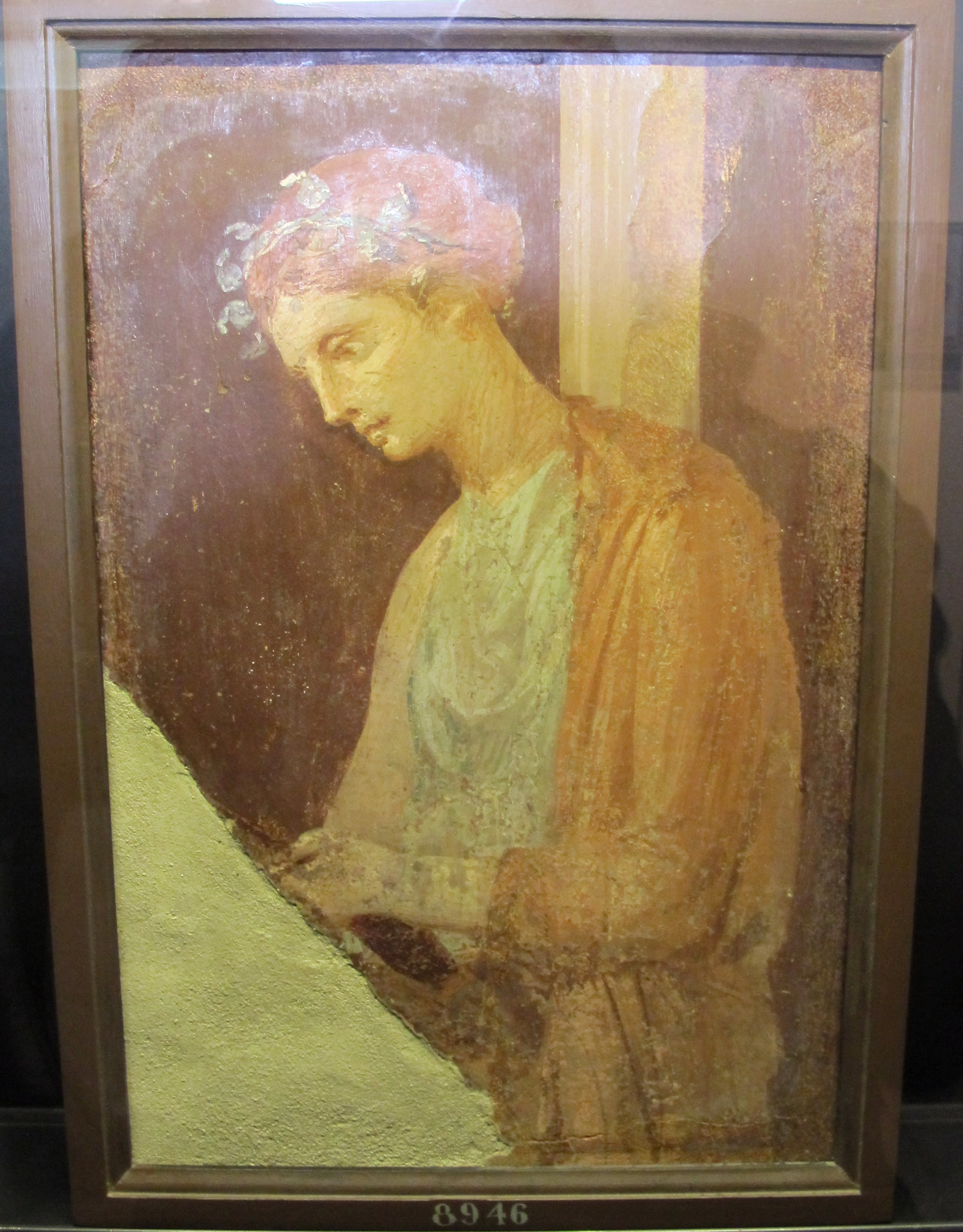
Roman fresco of a woman reading a text, Pompeian Fourth Style (60–79 AD), Pompeii, Italy

Prior to the 3rd century BC, the Roman system of education was closely bound to the Roman social institution of patria potestas, in which the father acted as head of the household (pater familias), and had, according to law, the absolute right of control over his children. It was the father's duty to educate his children and should he be unable to fulfil this duty, the task was assumed by other family members. It was not until 272 BC with the capture of Tarentum, the annexation of Sicily in 241 BC, and the period following the First Punic War that Romans were exposed to a strong influence of Greek thought and lifestyle and found leisure to study the arts.

In the 3rd century BC, a Greek captive from Tarentum named Livius Andronicus was sold as a slave and employed as a tutor for his master's children. After obtaining his freedom, he continued to live in Rome and became the first schoolmaster (private tutor) to follow Greek methods of education and would translate Homer's Odyssey into Latin verse in Saturnian meter.

As Rome grew in size and in power, following the Punic Wars, the importance of the family as the central unit within Roman society began to deteriorate, and with this decline, the old Roman system of education carried out by the pater familias deteriorated as well. The new educational system began to center more on the one encountered by the Romans with the prominent Greek and Hellenistic centers of learning such as Alexandria later on. It was becoming a literary educational system.

The situation of the Greeks was ideal for the foundation of literary education as they were the possessors of the great works of Homer, Hesiod, and the Lyric poets of Archaic Greece. The absence of a literary method of education from Roman life was due to the fact that Rome was bereft of any national literature. The military arts were all that Rome could afford to spend time studying. When not waging war, the Romans devoted what time remained to agriculture. The concern of Rome was that of survival, whether through defense or dominion. It was not until the appearance of Ennius (239–169 BC), the father of Roman poetry, that any sort of national literature surfaced.

While the Romans adopted many aspects of Greek education, two areas, in particular, were viewed as trifles: music and athletics. Music to the Greeks was fundamental to their educational system and tied directly to the Greek paideia. Mousike — literally 'the art of the Muses'— was a combination of modern-day music, dance, lyrics, and poetry, comparable to today's liberal arts. The area that many Romans considered unimportant equates to our modern definition of music. To the Greeks, the ability to play an instrument was the mark of a civilized, educated man, and through education in all areas of mousike, it was thought that the soul could become more moderate and cultivated. The Romans did not share this view and considered the study of music as a path to moral corruption. However, they did adopt one area of mousike: Greek literature.

Athletics, to the Greeks, was the means to obtaining a healthy and beautiful body, which was an end in and of itself and further promoted their love of competition. The Romans, though, did not share this stance either, believing that athletics was only the means to maintaining good soldiers.

This illustrates one of the central differences between the two cultures and their view on education: that to the Greeks beauty or activity could be an end in itself, and the practice of that activity was beneficial accordingly. The Romans, on the other hand, tended to be more practically minded when it came to what they taught their children. To them, it would appear, an area of study was good only as far as it served a better purpose or end determined outside of itself. Also, prior to the war, they had focused more on government and politics rather than the army and military.

== Tiers of schooling ==
=== Moral education ===
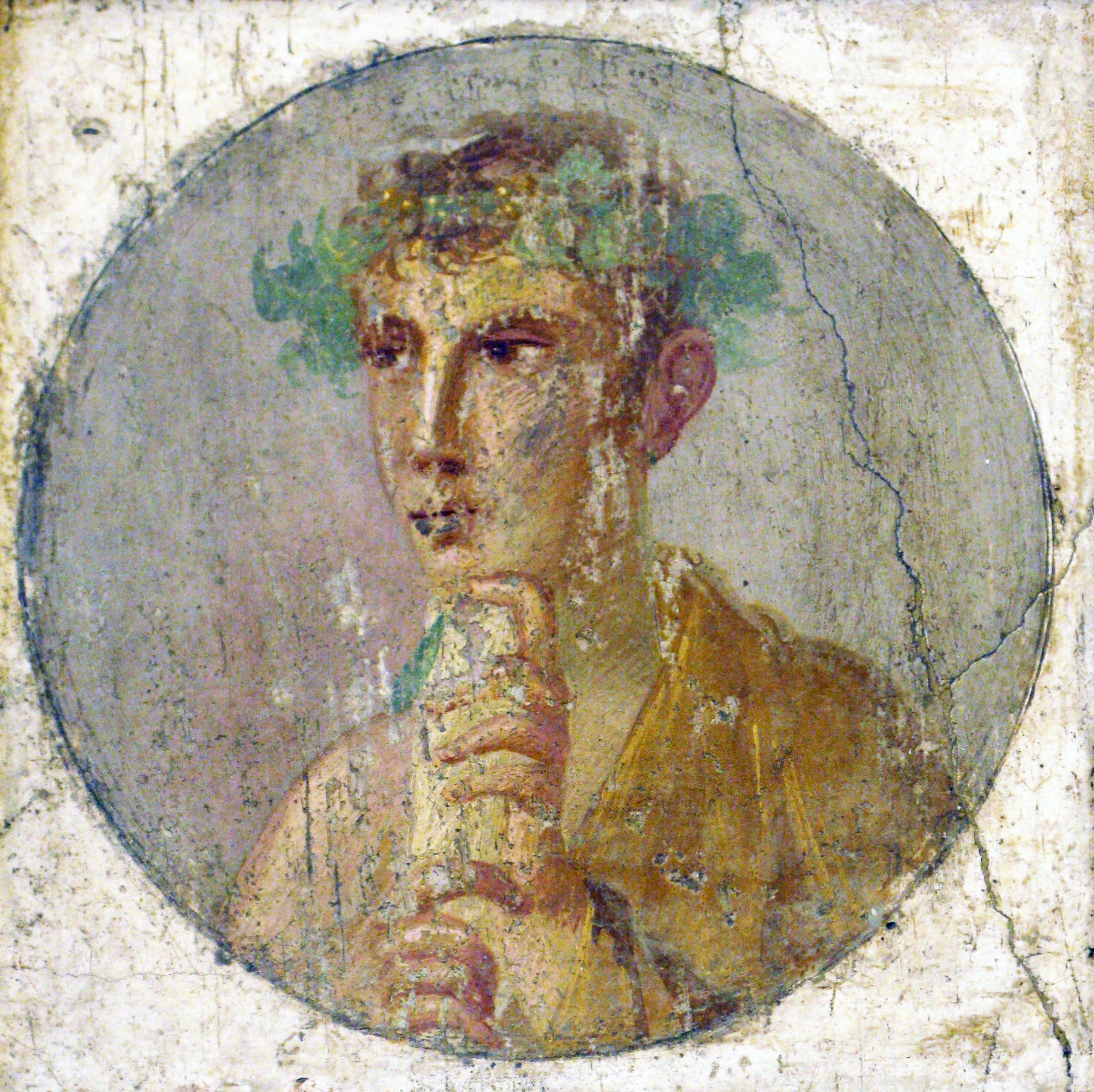
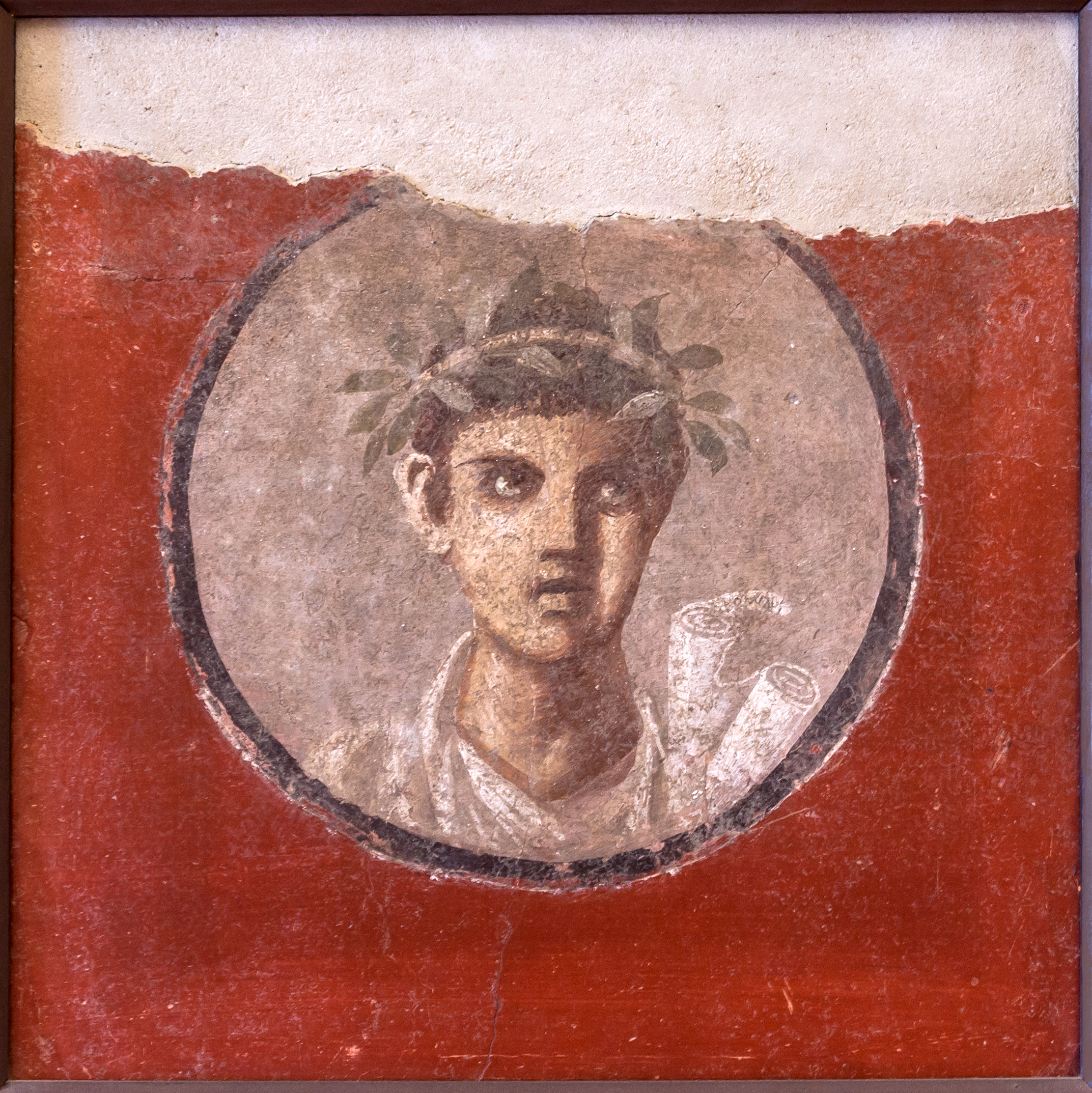
Roman portraiture frescos from Pompeii, 1st century AD, depicting two different men wearing laurel wreaths, one holding the rotulus (blondish figure, left), the other a volumen (brunet figure, right), both made of papyrus

At the foundation of ancient Greek education was an effective system of formal education, but in contrast, the Romans lacked such a system until the 3rd century BC. Instead, at the foundation of ancient Roman education was, above all else, the home and family, from which children derived their so-called "moral education".

Whereas Greek boys primarily received their education from the community, a Roman child's first and most important educators were almost always his or her parents. Parents taught their children the skills necessary for living in the early republic, which included agricultural, domestic, and military skills as well as the moral and civil responsibilities that would be expected from them as citizens. Roman education was carried on almost exclusively in the household under the direction of the pater familias. From the pater familias or highest-ranking male of the family, one usually learned "just enough reading, writing, and Arithmetic to enable them to understand simple business transactions and to count, weigh, and measure.

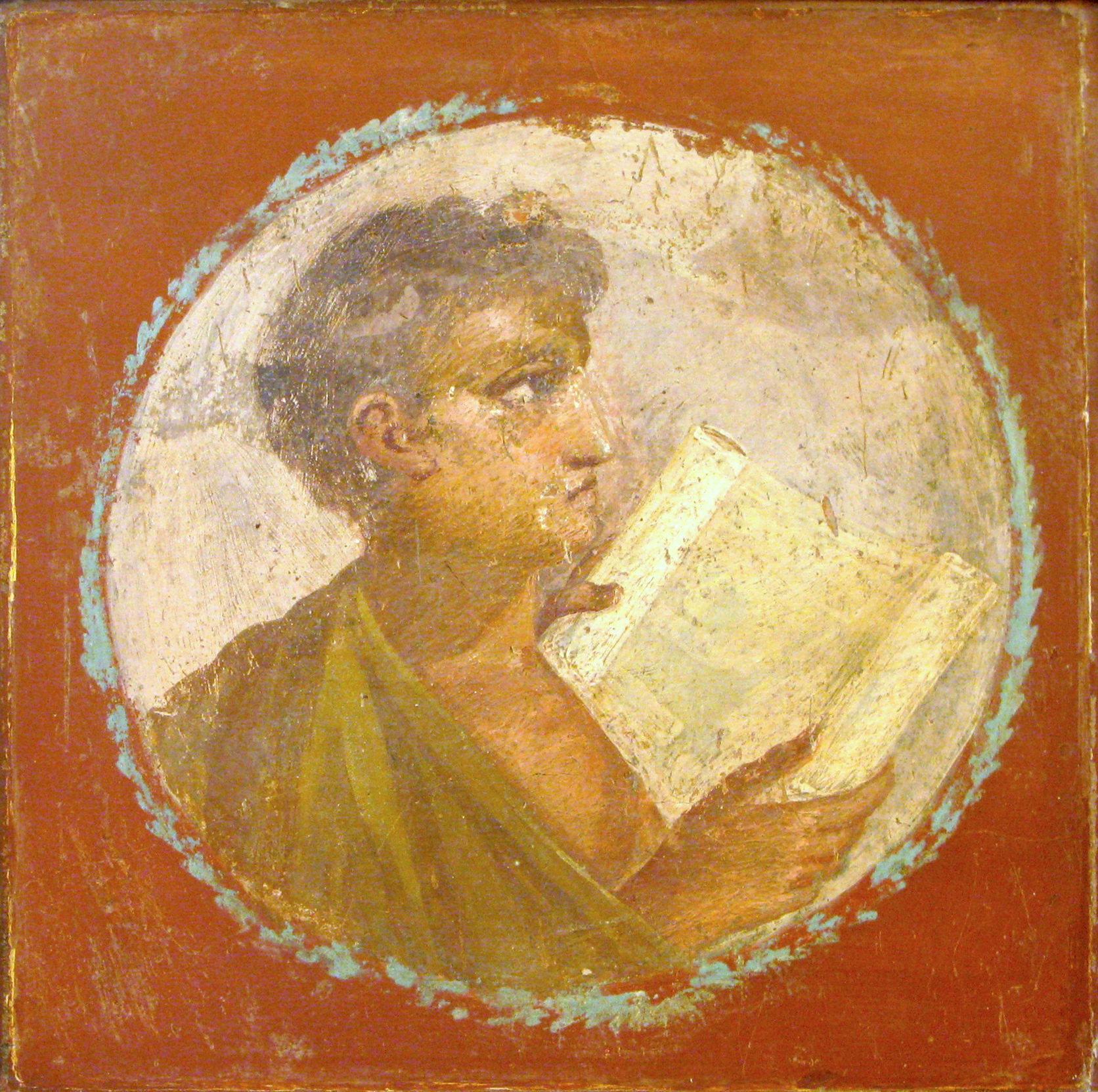
Roman portraiture fresco of a young man with a papyrus scroll, from Herculaneum, 1st century AD

Men like Cato the Elder adhered to this Roman tradition and took their roles as teachers very seriously. Cato the Elder not only made his children hardworking, good citizens and responsible Romans, but "he was his (son's) reading teacher, his law professor, his athletic coach. He taught his son not only to hurl a javelin, to fight in armor, and to ride a horse, but also to box, to endure both heat and cold, and to swim well".

Job training was also emphasized, and boys gained valuable experience through apprenticeships. Mothers, though, cannot be overlooked for their roles as moral educators and character builders of their children. Cornelia Africana, the mother of the Gracchi, is even credited as a major cause of her sons' renowned eloquence.

Perhaps the most important role of the parents in their children's education was to instil in them a respect for tradition and a firm comprehension of pietas, or devotion to duty. For a boy, this meant devotion to the state, and for a girl, devotion to her husband and family. As the Roman Republic transitioned into a more formal education, parents began to hire teachers for this level of advanced academic training. For this, "the Romans began to bring Greek slaves to Rome" to further enrich their children's knowledge and potential; yet, Romans still always cherished the tradition of pietas and the ideal of the father as his child's teacher.

=== Ludus ===
Rome as a republic or an empire never formally instituted a state-sponsored form of elementary education. In no stage of its history did Rome ever legally require its people to be educated on any level.

It was typical for Roman children of wealthy families to receive their early education from private tutors. However, it was common for children of more humble means to be instructed in a primary school, traditionally known as a ludus litterarius. An instructor in such a school was often known as a litterator or litteratus, which was seen as a more respectable title. There was nothing stopping a litterator from setting up his own school, aside from his meager wages. There were never any established locations for a ludus litterarius. They could be found in a variety of places, anywhere from a private residence to a gymnasium, or even in the street.

Typically, elementary education in the Roman world focused on the requirements of everyday life, reading and writing. The students would progress up from reading and writing letters, to syllables, to word lists, eventually memorizing and dictating texts. The majority of the texts used in early Roman education were literature, predominantly poetry. Greek poets, such as Homer and Hesiod, were frequently used as classroom examples due to the lack of Roman literature. Roman students were expected to work on their own. There was little sense of a class as a cohesive unit, exemplified by students coming and going at different times throughout the day. Young Roman students faced no formal examinations or tests. Their performance was measured through exercises that were either corrected or applauded based on performance. This created an unavoidable sense of competition amongst students.

Using a competitive educational system, Romans developed a form of social control that allowed elites to maintain class stability. This, along with the obvious monetary expenses, prevented the majority of Roman students from advancing to higher levels of education.

=== Grammaticus ===
At between nine and twelve years of age, boys from affluent families would leave their litterator behind and take up study with a grammaticus, who honed his students' writing and speaking skills, versed them in the art of poetic analysis, and taught them Greek if they did not yet know it. Poetry analysis continued to use the same poems and poets the students were exposed to in ludus, such as Phoenissae by Euripides. By this point, lower-class boys would already be working as apprentices, and girls — rich or poor — would be focused on making themselves attractive brides and, subsequently, capable mothers.

Daily activities included lectures by the grammaticus (narratio), expressive reading of poetry (lectio) and the analysis of poetry (partitio). The curriculum was thoroughly bilingual, as students were expected to both read and speak in Greek as well as in Latin. Assessment of a student's performance was done on-the-spot and on-the-fly according to standards set by his particular grammaticus, as no source on Roman education ever mentions work taken away to be graded. Instead, pupils would complete an exercise, display their results, and be corrected or congratulated as needed by the grammaticus, who reveled in his self-perception as a "guardian of language".

Famous grammatici include Lucius Orbilius Pupillus, who still serves as the quintessential pedagogue that is not afraid to flog or whip his students to drive a point home, and the freedman Marcus Verrius Flaccus, who gained imperial patronage and a widespread tutelage due to his novel practice of pitting students of similar age and ability against each other and rewarding the winner with a prize, usually an old book of some rarity.

Even at the height of his career, Verrius Flaccus, whose prestige allowed him to charge enormous fees and be hired by Augustus to teach his grandsons, never had his own schoolroom. Instead, he, like many of his fellow teachers, shared space at privately financed schools, which were dependent on (usually very low) tuition fees, and rented classroom space wherever they could find it. Other teachers sidestepped rent and lighting costs by convening their classes on pavements, colonnades, or in other public spaces, where traffic noise, street crowds, and bad weather posed problems.

Though both literary and documentary sources interchange the various titles for a teacher and often use the most general of terms as a catch-all, a price edict issued by Diocletian in AD 301 proves that such distinctions did in fact exist and that a litterator, grammaticus or rhetor, at least in theory, had to define himself as such. This Edict on Maximum Prices fixed the salary of a grammaticus at 200 denarii per pupil per month, though the edict was unenforceable, ignored, and eventually repealed.

Children continued their studies with the grammaticus until the age of fourteen or fifteen, at which point only the wealthiest and most promising students matriculated with a rhetor.

=== Rhetor ===
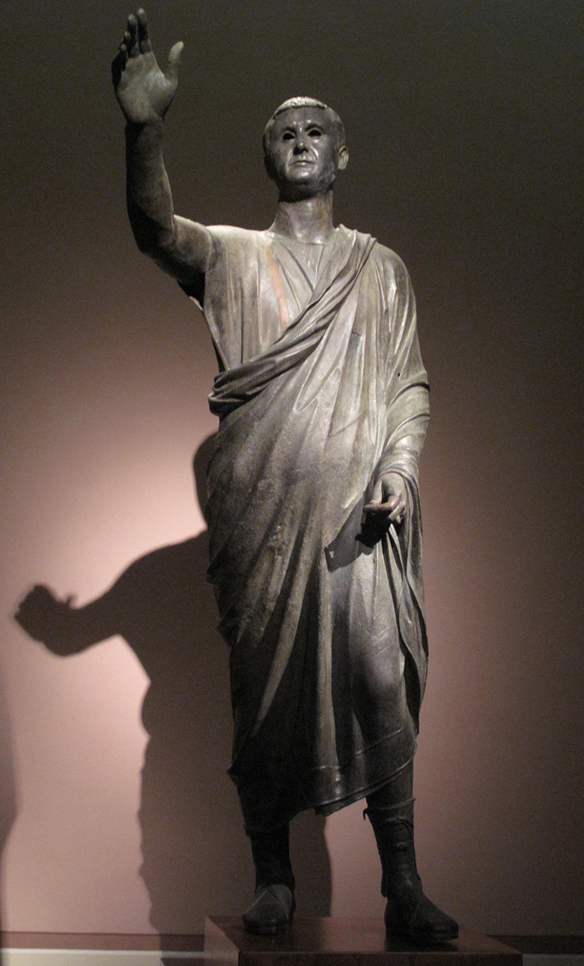
The Orator, c. 100 BC, an Etrusco-Roman bronze statue depicting Aule Metele (Latin: Aulus Metellus), an Etruscan man wearing a Roman toga while engaged in rhetoric; the statue features an inscription in the Etruscan alphabet

The rhetor was the final stage in Roman education. Very few boys went on to study rhetoric. Early on in Roman history, it may have been the only way to train as a lawyer or politician.

In early Roman times, rhetoric studies were not taught exclusively through a teacher, but were learned through a student's careful observation of his elders. The practice of rhetoric was created by the Greeks before it became an institution in Roman society, and it took a long time for it to gain acceptance in Rome.

The orator, or student of rhetoric, was important in Roman society because of the constant political strife that occurred throughout Roman history. Young men who studied under a rhetor would not only focus on public speaking. These students also learned other subjects such as geography, music, philosophy, literature, mythology, and geometry. These well-rounded studies gave Roman orators a more diverse education and helped prepare them for future debates.

Unlike other forms of Roman education, there is not much evidence to show that the rhetor level was available to be pursued in organized school. Because of this lack of evidence, it is assumed that the education was done through the previously mentioned private tutors. These tutors had an enormous impact on the opinions and actions of their students. In fact, their influence was so great that the Roman government expelled many rhetoricians and philosophers in 161 BC.

There were two fields of oratory study that were available for young men. The first of these fields was the deliberative branch of study. This field was for the training of young men who would later need to urge the "advisability or inadvisability" of measures affecting the Roman Senate. The second field of study was much more lucrative and was known as a judicial oratory. These orators would later enter into fields such as criminal law, which was important in gaining a public following. The support of the public was necessary for a successful political career in Rome.

Later in Roman history, the practice of declamation became focused more on the art of delivery as opposed to training to speak on important issues in the courts. Tacitus pointed out that during his day (the second half of the 1st century AD), students had begun to lose sight of legal disputes and had started to focus more of their training on the art of storytelling.

=== Philosophy ===
A final level of education was philosophical study. The study of philosophy is distinctly Greek, but was undertaken by many Roman students. To study philosophy, a student would have to go to a center of philosophy where philosophers taught, usually abroad in Greece. An understanding of a philosophical school of thought could have done much to add to Cicero's vaunted knowledge of 'that which is great', but could be pursued by the very wealthiest of Rome's elite. Romans regarded philosophical education as distinctly Greek and instead focused their efforts on building schools of law and rhetoric.

== See also ==
- Education in ancient Greece
- Ancient higher-learning institutions
