= Hanging scroll =

Type of scroll painting

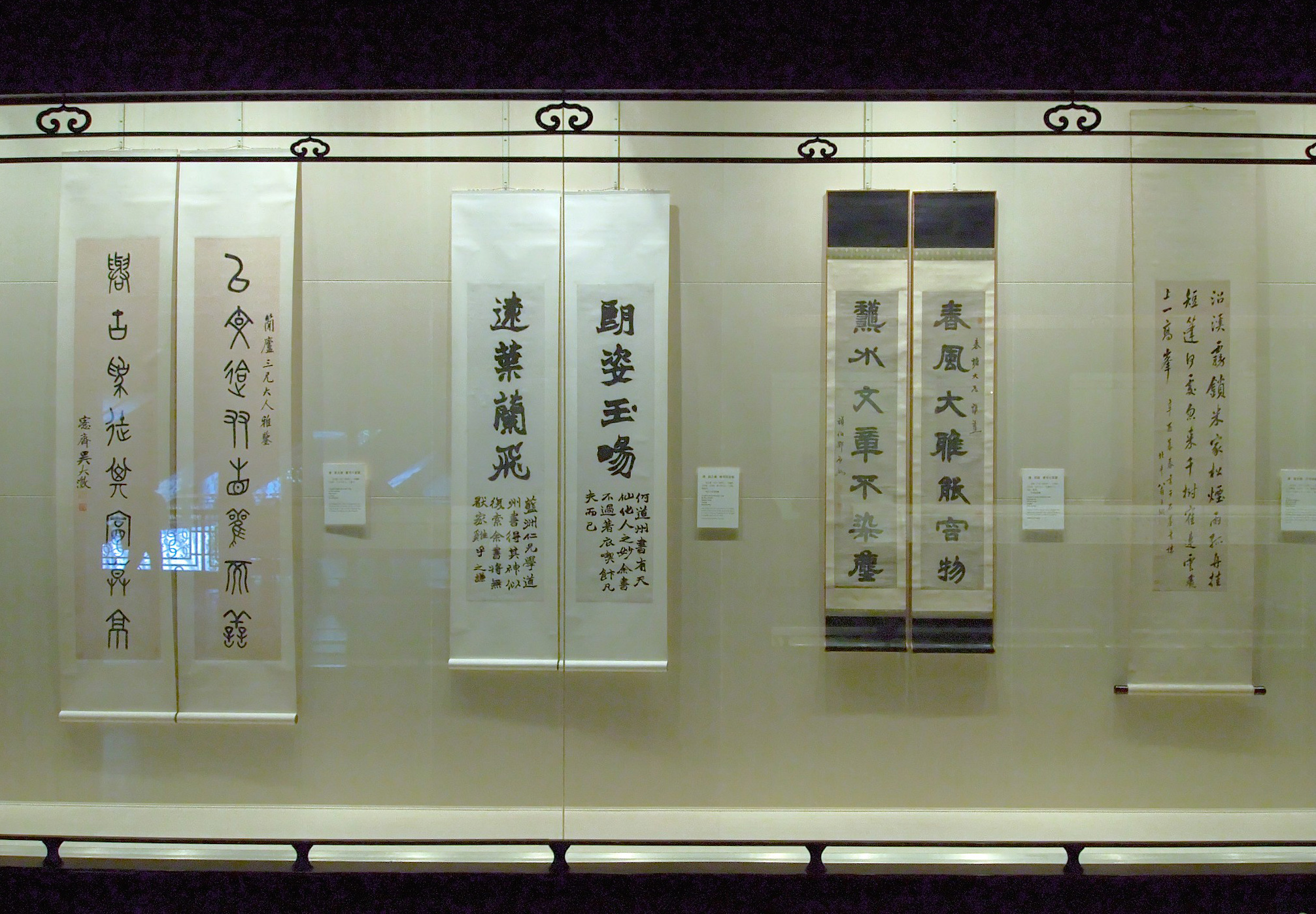
- Chinese hanging scrolls on display

Chinese name
- Chinese: 立軸 掛軸 軸
Transcriptions
Standard Mandarin
- Hanyu Pinyin: lìzhóu guàzhóu zhóu
- Bopomofo: ㄌㄧˋㄓㄡˊ ㄍㄨㄚˋㄓㄡˊ ㄓㄡˊ
Yue: Cantonese
- Yale Romanization: lahpjuhk gwajuhk juhk
- Jyutping: lap6zuk6 gwaa3zuk6 zuk6
- Canton Romanization: leb6zug6 gua3zug6 zug6
Southern Min
- Hokkien POJ: li̍p-te̍k kòa-te̍k te̍k

Vietnamese name
- Vietnamese alphabet: tranh cuộn
- Chữ Nôm: 𢂰𦄣

Korean name
- Hangul: 족자
Transcriptions
- Revised Romanization: jogja

Japanese name
- Kanji: 掛軸
- Hiragana: かけじく
- Katakana: カケジク
Transcriptions
- Romanization: kakejiku

A hanging scroll is one of the many traditional ways to display and exhibit East Asian painting and calligraphy. They are different from handscrolls, which are narrower and designed to be viewed flat on a table.

Hanging scrolls are generally intended to be displayed for short periods of time, after which they are rolled up and tied for storage. They are traditionally rotated according to season or occasion, rather than be on permanent display. Their artwork could be mounted with decorative brocade silk borders. The craft of creating a hanging scroll is considered an art in itself.

== History ==
Scrolls originated in their earliest form from texts written on bamboo strips and silk banners across ancient China. The earliest hanging scrolls are related to and developed from silk banners in early Chinese history. These banners were long and hung vertically on walls. Such silk banners and hanging scroll paintings were found at Mawangdui dating back to the Han dynasty (206 BCE – 220 CE). The aesthetic and structural objectives for hanging scrolls were summarized by the time of the Tang dynasty (618–907) and are still followed in the present day. During the early Song dynasty (960–1279), artists found that hanging scrolls were well suited to their art styles.

Originally introduced to Japan from China as a means of spreading Buddhism, hanging scrolls found a place in Japanese culture and art and plays an important role in interior decoration.

== Description ==
Hanging scrolls provide a vertical format to display art on walls. They are one of the most common types of scrolls for Chinese painting and calligraphy. They are made in many different sizes and proportions. Horizontal hanging scrolls are also a common form.

Hanging scrolls are different from the handscrolls. A handscroll is a long narrow scroll for displaying a series of scenes in Chinese painting. It intended to be viewed section for section, flat on a table, during its unrolling. In contrast, a hanging scroll is appreciated in its entirety.

== Mounting styles ==
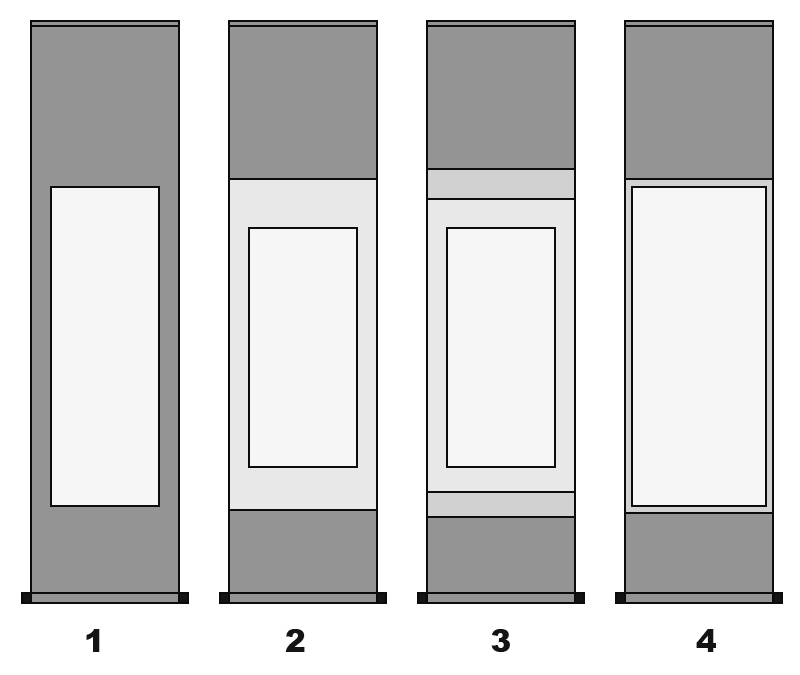
Schematic of mounting styles: yisebiao (1), ersebiao (2), sansebiao (3), and Xuanhezhuang (4)

There are several hanging scroll styles for mounting, known in Chinese as:

- Yisebiao (一色裱, one color mount)
- Ersebiao (二色裱, two color mount)
- Sansebiao (三色裱, three color mount)
- Xuanhezhuang (宣和裝, Xuanhe style), also known as Songshibiao (宋式裱, Song dynasty mount)

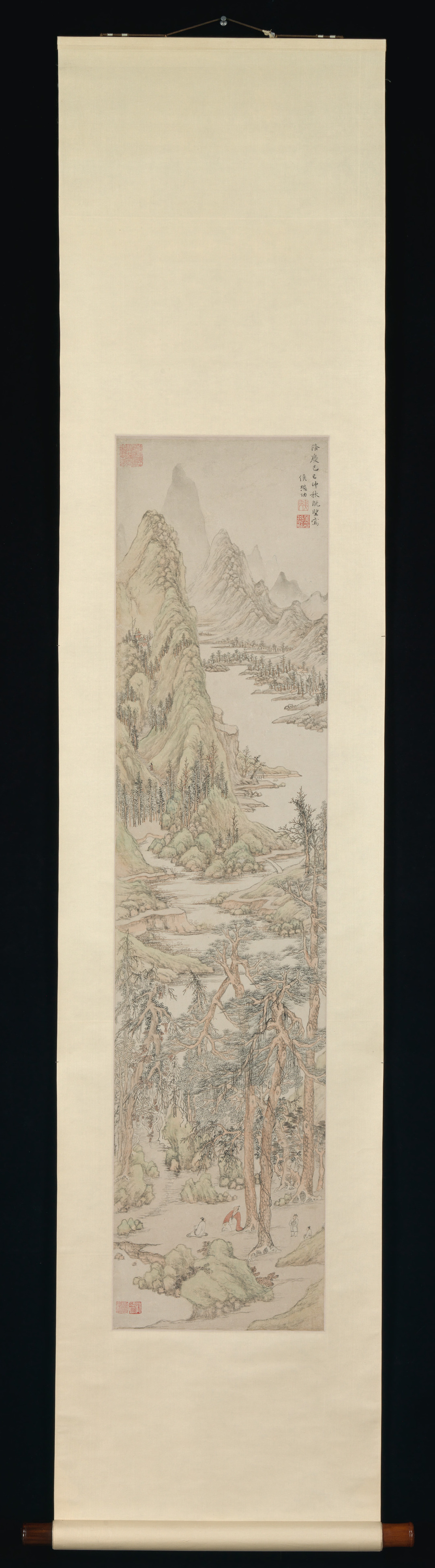
(1)

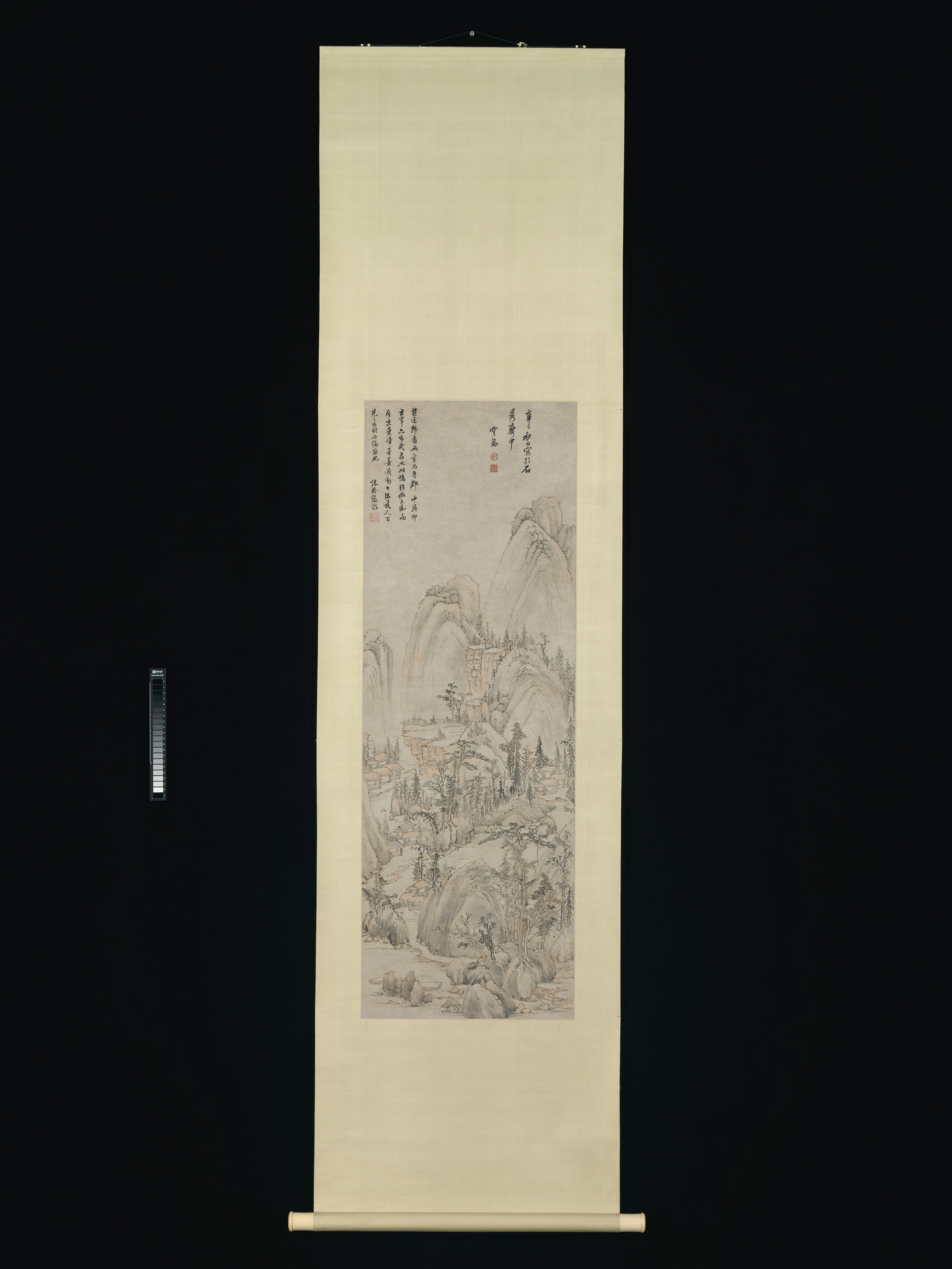
(1)

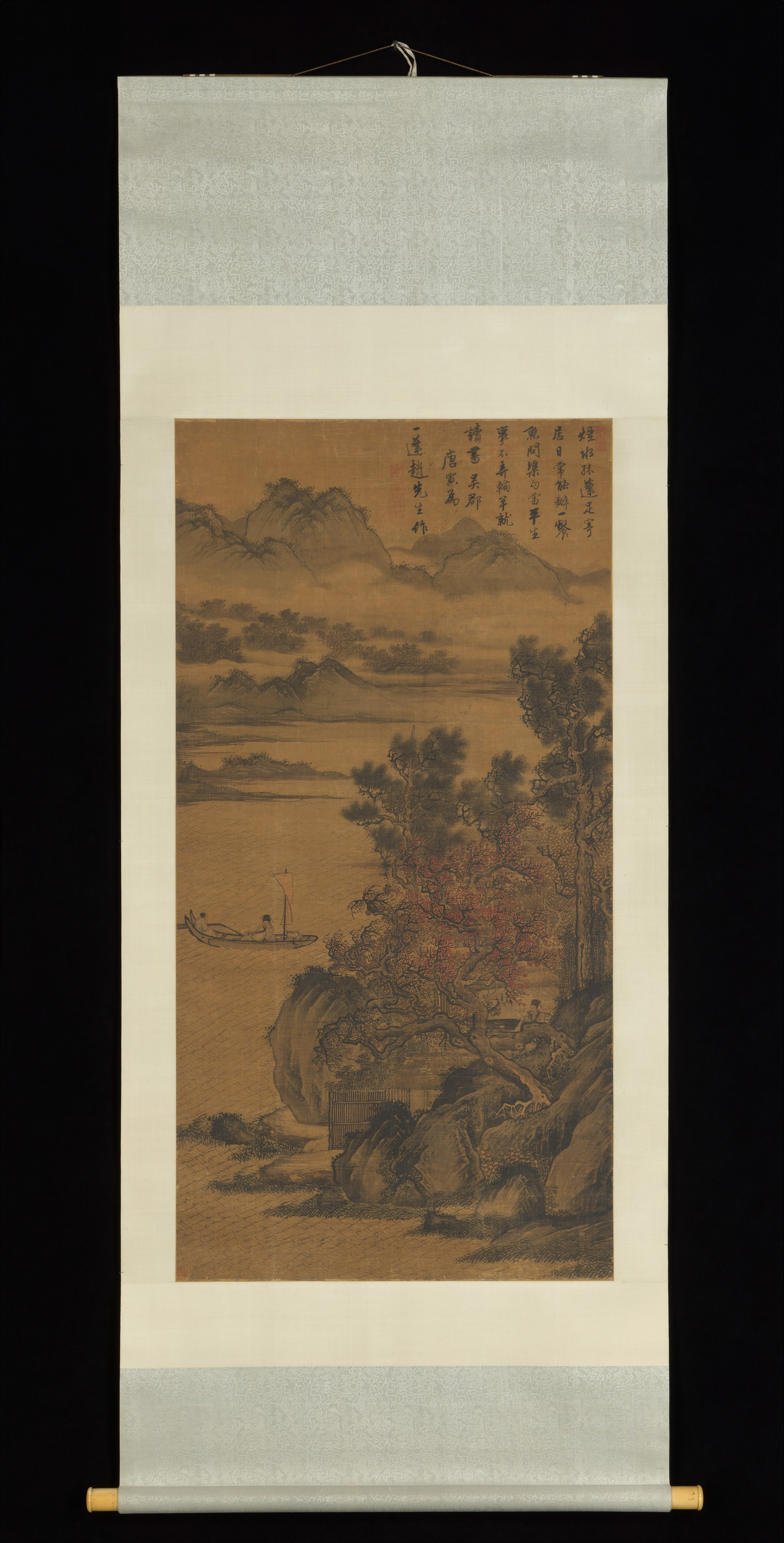
(2)

(2)

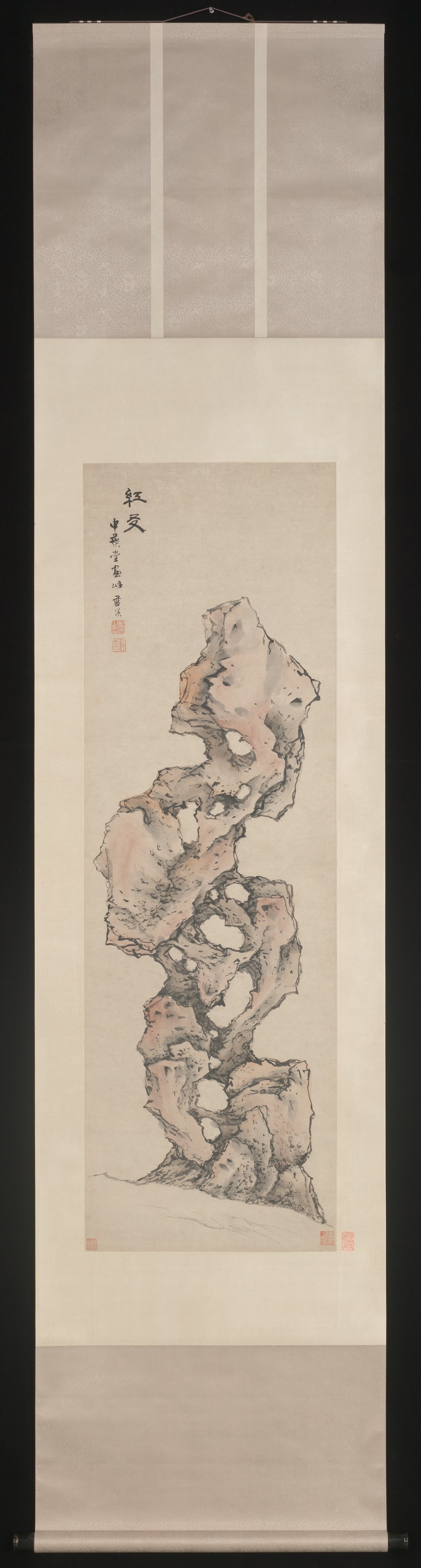
(2)

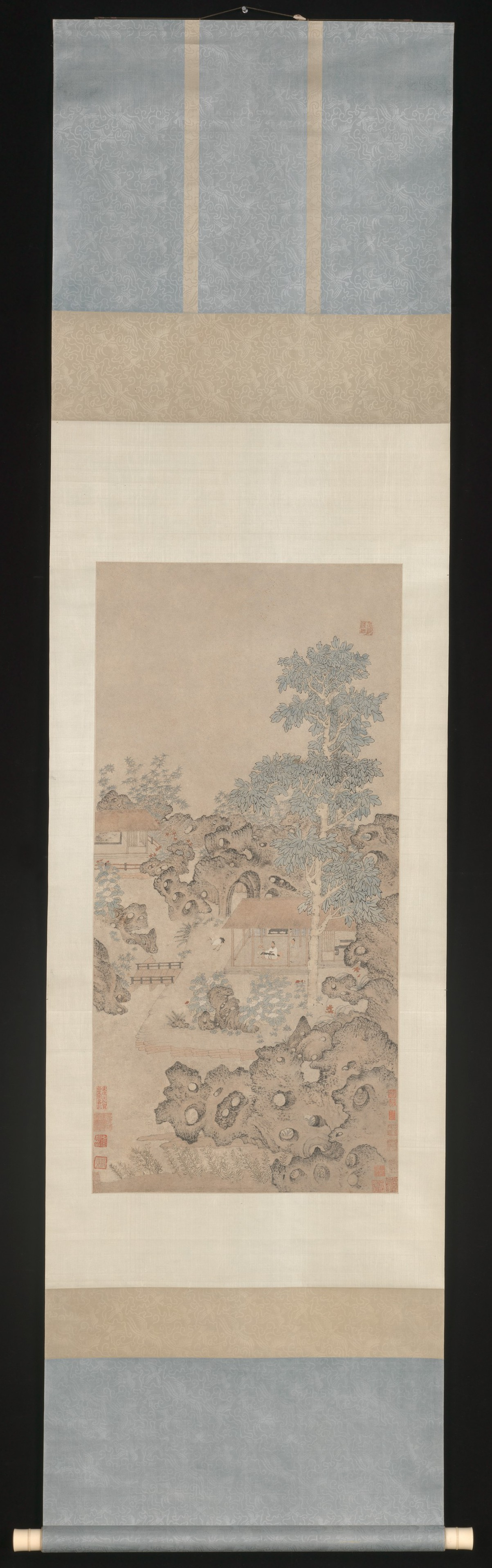
(3)

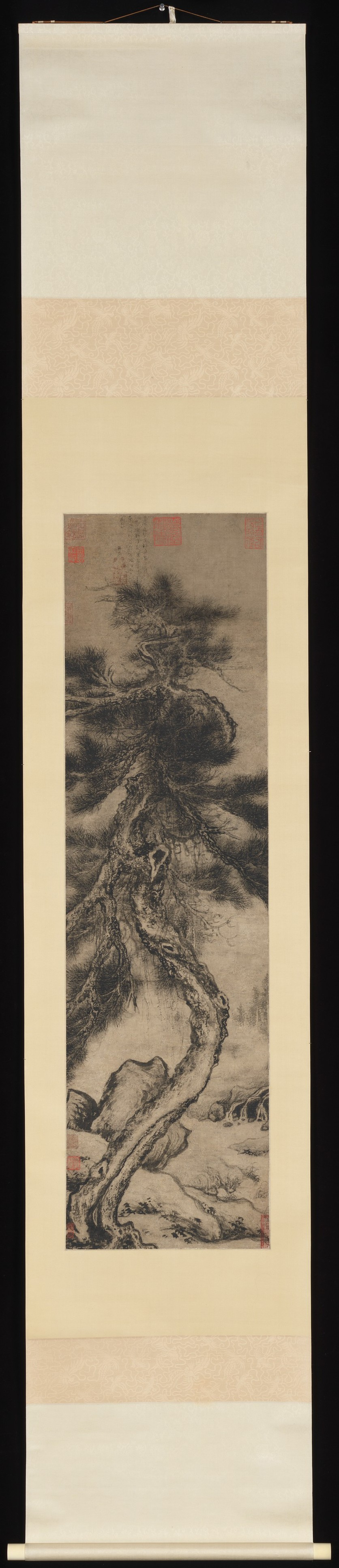
(3)

Mounting styles, including yisebiao (1), ersebiao (2), and sansebiao (3)

== Arrangements and formats ==
Besides the previous styles of hanging scroll mountings, there are a few additional ways to format the hanging scroll.

- Hall painting (中堂畫)

A hall painting is intended to be the centerpiece in a main hall. It is usually large, serves as a focal point in an interior, and often has a complicated subject.

- Four hanging scrolls (四條屏)

These hanging scrolls were developed from screen paintings. They comprise several narrow and long hanging scrolls usually hung next to each other on a wall, but they can also be hung separately. Their subjects have related themes, such as the Four Gentlemen (orchid, bamboo, chrysanthemum, plum blossom) or the Four Beauties (ladies renowned for their beauty).

- Panoramic screen (通景屏)

The panoramic screen consists of several hanging scrolls that have continuous images, in which the subject continues further in another scroll. These hanging scrolls cover large areas of a wall and usually do not have a border in between.

- Couplet (對聯)

A couplet is two hanging scrolls placed side by side or accompanying a scroll in the middle. They have calligraphy in vertical writing. This style became popular during the Ming dynasty (1368–1644).

- Thin strip painting (條幅畫)

Narrow strip paintings intended for smaller rooms and spaces.

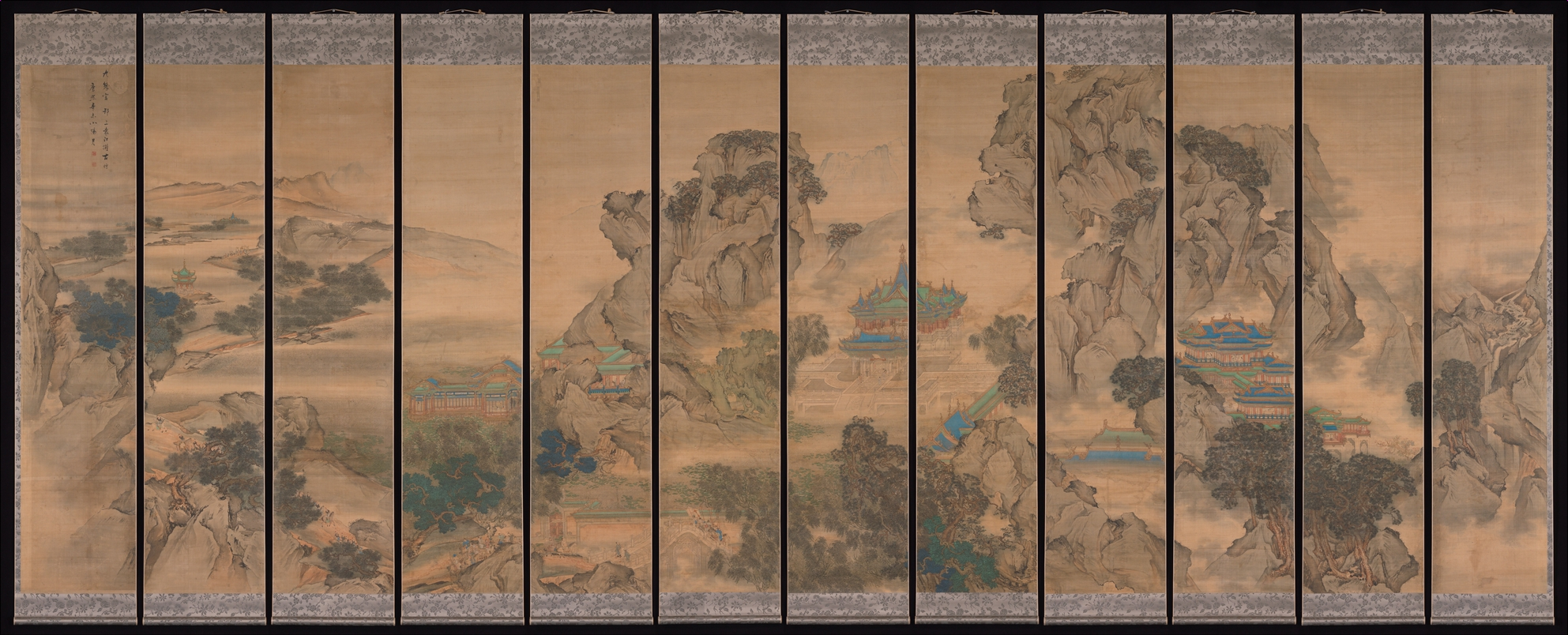
(1)

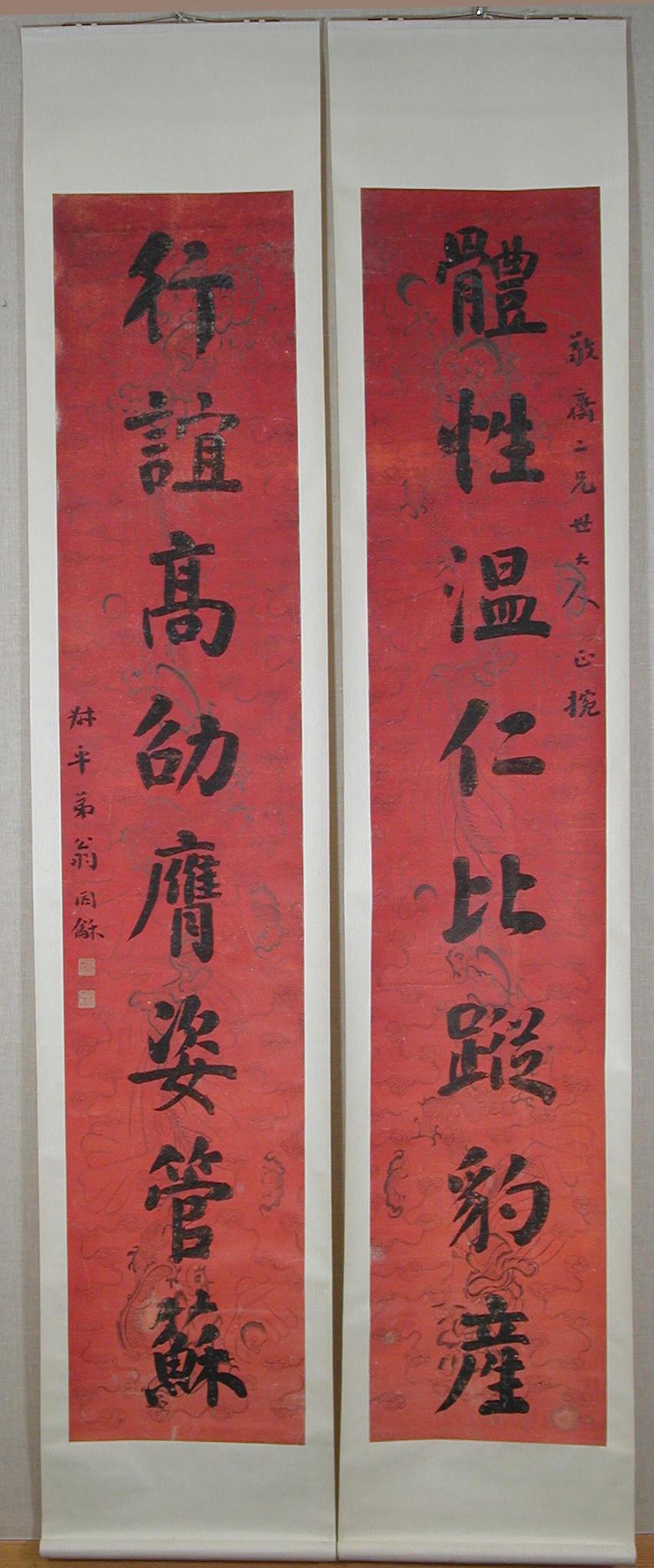
(2)

Arrangements and formats, including panoramic screens (1) and couplets (2)

== Features and materials ==
Chinese mounting and conservation techniques are considered a traditional craft and are believed to have developed around 2,000 years ago. This craft is considered an art unto itself. Careful attention was and still is paid to ensure the quality and variety of the silk and paper to protect and properly fit the artwork onto the mounting, as it gives form to the art. The art is fixed onto a four-sided inlay, made from paper or silk, thus providing a border.

The artwork in the middle of the scroll is called huaxin (畫心; literally "painted heart"). There is sometimes a section above the artwork called a shitang (詩塘; literally "poetic pool"), which is usually reserved for inscriptions onto the work of art, ranging from a short verse to poems and other inscriptions. These inscriptions are often done by people other than the artist. Although inscriptions can also be placed onto the material of the artwork itself. The upper part of the scroll is called tiantou (天頭; symbolizing "Heaven") and the lower part is called ditou (地頭; symbolizing "Earth").

At the top of the scroll is a thin wooden bar, called tiangan (天杆), on which a cord is attached for hanging the scroll. Two decorative strips, called jingyan (惊燕; literally "frighten swallows"), are sometimes attached to the top of the scroll. At the bottom of the scroll is a wooden cylindrical bar, called digan (地杆), attached to give the scroll the necessary weight to hang properly onto a wall, but it also serves to roll up a scroll for storage when the artwork is not in display. The two knobs at the far ends of the lower wooden bar are called zhoutou (軸頭) and help to ease the rolling of the scroll. These could be ornamented with a variety of materials, such as jade, ivory, or horn.

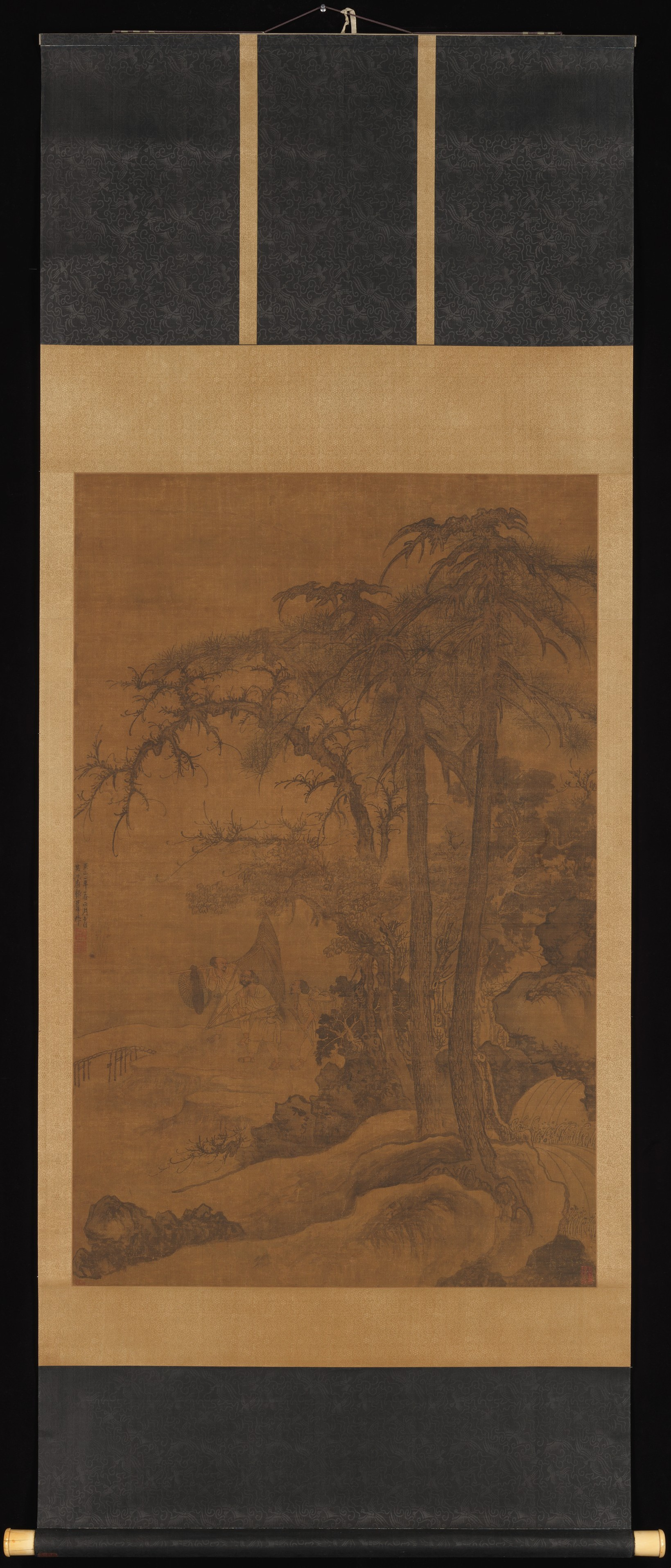
(1)

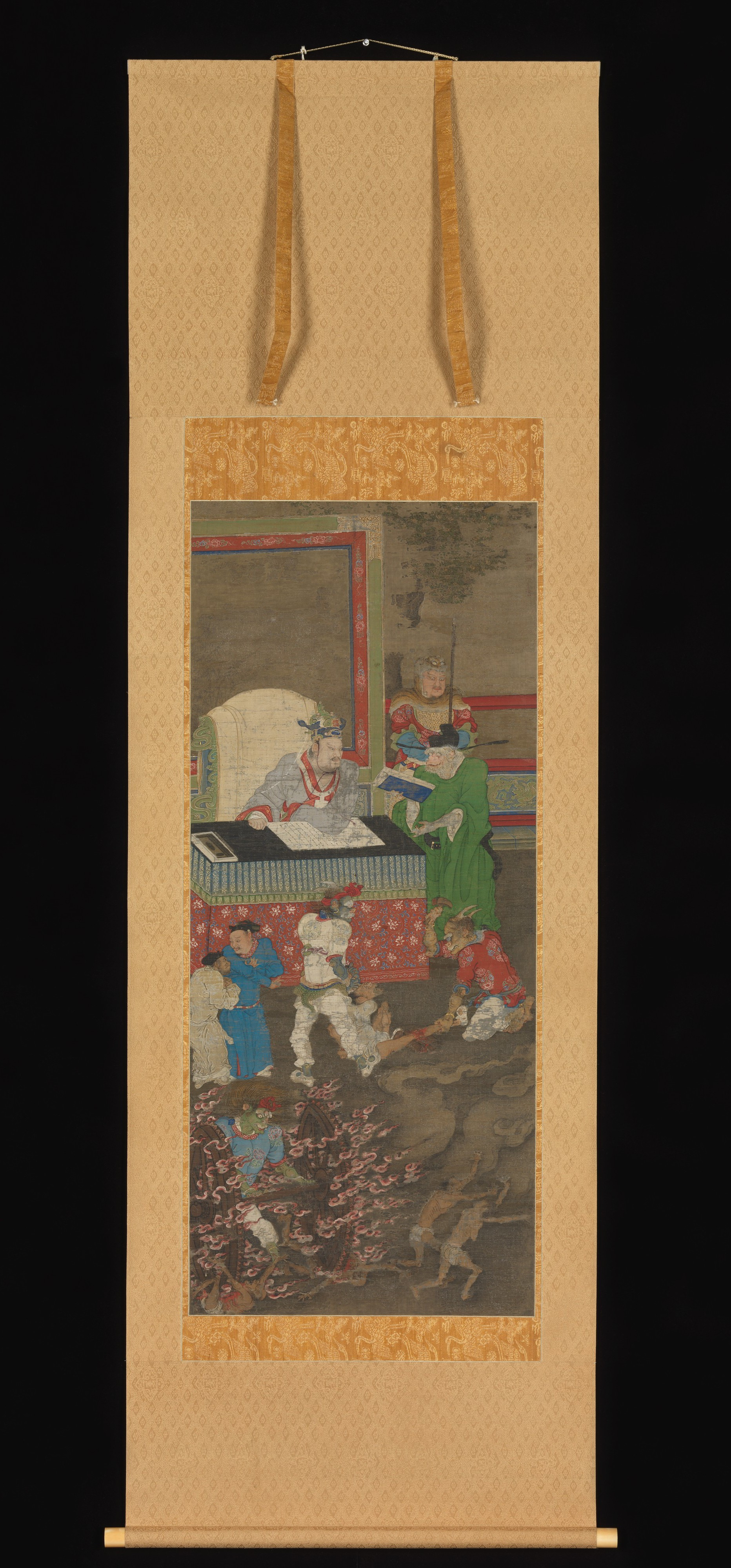
(2)

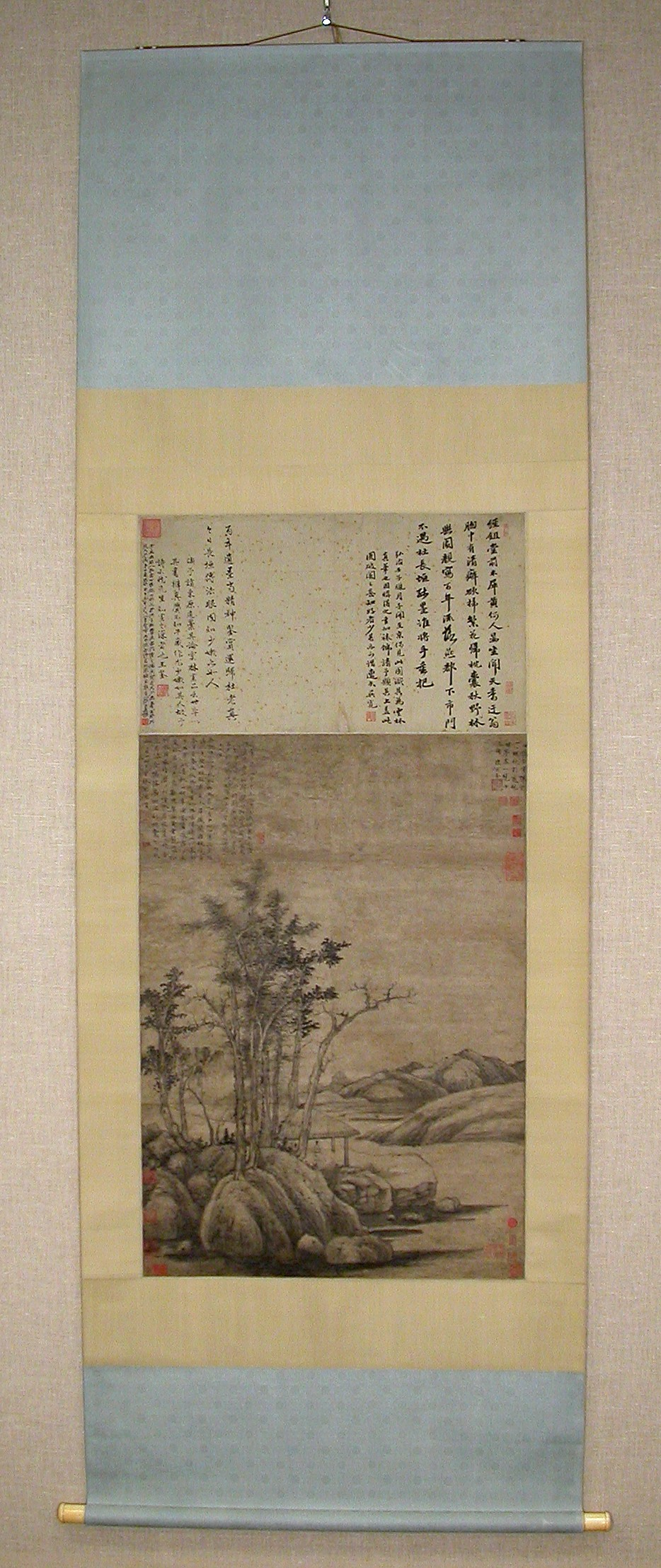
(3)

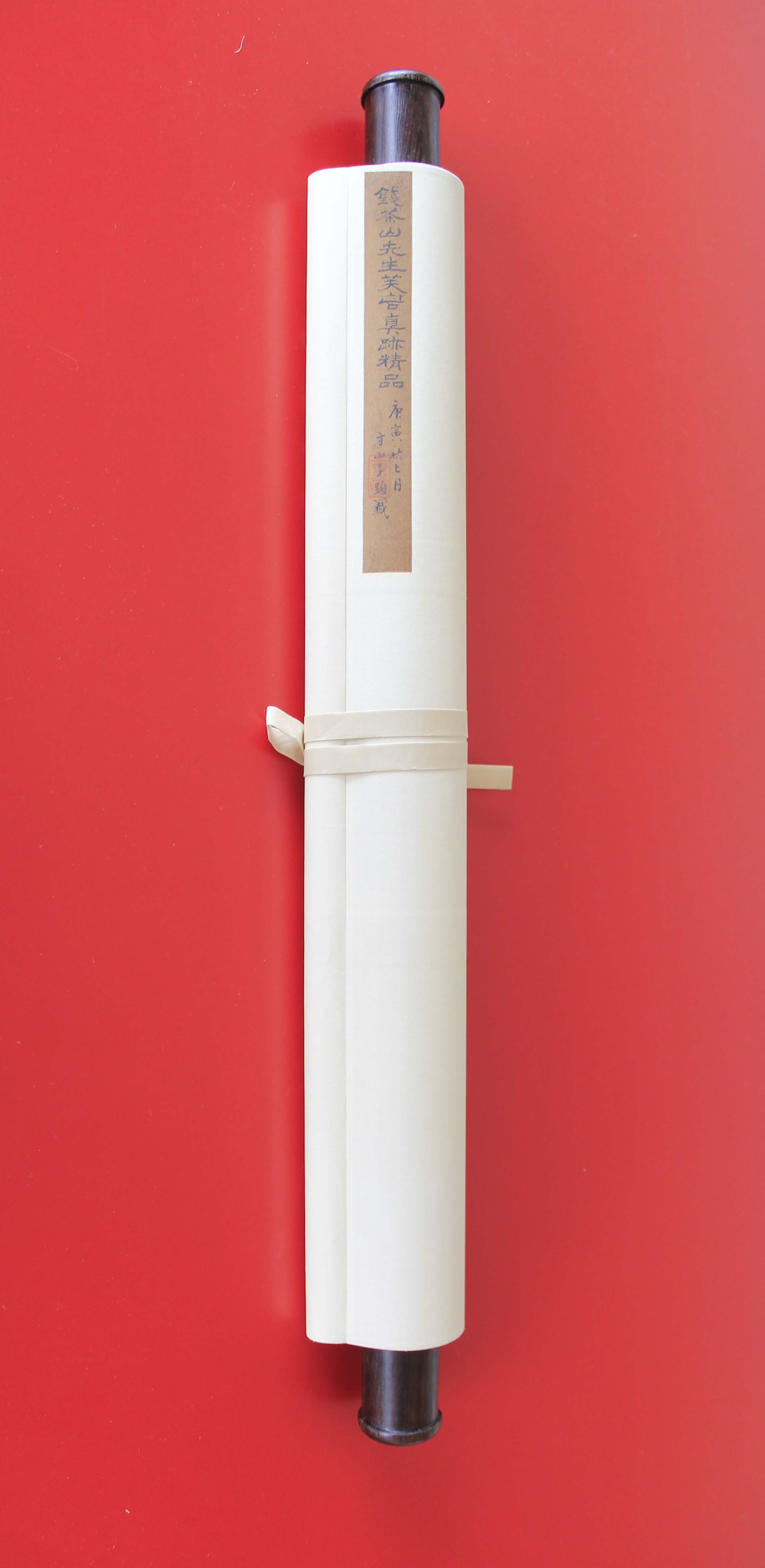
(4)

Elements of a hanging scroll: decorative strips known as jingyan (1, 2) at the top, attached and loose respectively; an inscription panel known as shitang (3) above the artwork; a rolled-up hanging scroll with a label strip (4) on the back and two knobs known as zhoutou (4) on the sides

== Method and processes ==
Traditional scroll mounters go through a lengthy process of backing the mounting silks with paper using paste before creating the borders for the scroll. Afterwards, the whole scroll is backed before the roller and fittings are attached. The whole process can take two weeks to nine months depending on how long the scroll is left on the wall to dry and stretch before finishing by polishing the back with Chinese wax and fitting the rod and roller at either end. This process is generally called 'wet mounting' due to the use of wet paste in the process.

In the late 20th century a new method was created called 'dry mounting' which involves the use of heat activated silicone sheets in lieu of paste which reduced the amount of time from a few weeks to just a few hours. This new method is generally used for mass-produced artwork rather than serious art or conservation as mounting done this way tends not to be as robust as wet mounting whose scrolls can last for over a century before it requires remounting.

== See also ==
- History of scrolls
- Ink and wash painting
- Kakemono
- Seal
