= Papyrus 136 =

Papyrus manuscript

- New Testament manuscript
- Name: P. Duke Inv. 1377
- Sign: 𝔓^{136}
- Text: Acts 4:27-31 (recto); 7:26-30 (verso).
- Date: 6th century
- Script: Greek
- Found: Antiquities Market
- Now at: Duke University, David M. Rubenstein Library, Durham, NC
- Cite: Smith, W. A., & Smith, V. H. (2018). P. Duke Inv. 1377 (𝔓136): A Fragmentary Acts of the Apostles Papyrus. Novum Testamentum, 60(3), 290–310.
- Type: Alexandrian

Papyrus 136 (designated as 𝔓^{136} in the Gregory-Aland numbering system) is a small surviving portion of an early copy of part of the New Testament in Greek. It is a papyrus manuscript of the Acts. The text survives on a single fragment of a rotulus, the text on the verso being upside-down in relationship to the text on the recto. The manuscript has been assigned paleographically to the sixth century.

== Location ==
𝔓^{136} is housed at the David M. Rubenstein Library, Duke University, Durham, NC in the United States.

== Textual Variants ==
- 4:27 According to the Smiths' reconstruction, it contains the majority reading εν τη πολει ταυτη (in this city) along with 𝔓^{45vid} 01 03 05 08 044 33 1241 1739, versus εν τη πολει σου ταυτη (in this your city) found in 02 (the phrase is absent in over 20 manuscripts, including 1 18 61 69 88 462 641 1241 1505).
- 4:28 According to the VMR transcription, it reads η χειρ σου και η βουλη (your hand and counsel) along with 02* 03 08* 323 945 1175 1739 versus the majority reading η χειρ σου και η βουλη σου (your hand and your counsel) of 01 05 044 18 33 424 614 1241 1505. The Smiths' reconstruction reads η χειρ σου και η δουλη (your hand and maidservant).
- 4:30 It reads την χειρα σε εκτινειν ([your] hand you to be extending) with P74 02 1175, versus την χειρα σου εκτεινειν σε (your hand to be extending you) of most manuscripts; εκτεινειν την χειρα σου (to be extending your hand) of 𝔓^{45}; την χειρα εκτεινειν σε ([your] hand to be extending you) of 03; and την χειρα σου εκτεινειν (your hand to be extending) of 05 08 044 33 323 945 1241 1739.
- 7:26 According to the Smiths' reconstruction, it reads ανδρες αδελφοι εσται εινατ̣ι̣ (men, you are brothers, so why) supported by 𝔓^{74} 01 02 03 04 08 044 323 945 1739, which read ανδρες αδελφοι εστε ινα τι, versus τι ποιειτε ανδρες αδελφοι (What are you doing, men, brothers?) of 05 and ανδρες αδελφοι εστε υμεις εσται ινα τι (men, YOU are brothers) of most manuscripts.
- 7:28 A corrector added the missing εκθες to produce the reading εκθες τον αιγυπτιον as in 𝔓^{74} 01 03* 04 (05 has αιχθεσ τον αιγυπτιον) 1175, versus τον αιγυπτιο¯ χθεσ of 02 and the majority reading χθεσ τον αιγυπτιον. All of these are variant ways of expressing the meaning of "yesterday."
- 7:30a Along with 05, it abbreviates the number 'forty' as overlined μ, which is usually spelled out as either τεσσερακοντα, as in 𝔓^{74} 01 02 03* 04f 104 1003 1175, or as τεσσαρακοντα, as in 08 044 18 33 81 323 424 614 945 1241 1505 1739 and most other manuscripts.
- 7:30b It retains the character sequence ν πυρ, which indicates that while in pristine condition, it did not read εν φλογι πυρος (in a flame of fire) with the majority of manuscripts; the Smiths reconstruct the reading as εν πυρι φλογος (in a fire of flame), as found in 02 04.

== See also ==
- List of New Testament papyri
