= History of scrolls =

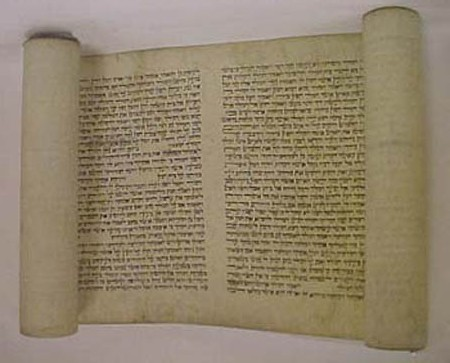
Scroll of the Book of Esther, Seville, Spain

A scroll (from the Old French escroe or escroue) is a roll of papyrus, parchment, or paper containing writing. The history of scrolls dates back to ancient Egypt. In most ancient literate cultures scrolls were the earliest format for longer documents written in ink or paint on a flexible background, preceding bound books; rigid media such as clay tablets were also used but had many disadvantages in comparison. For most purposes scrolls have long been superseded by the codex book format, but they are still produced for some ceremonial or religious purposes, notably for the Jewish Torah scroll for use in synagogues.

== Origins of the scroll ==
The oldest known scroll is the Diary of Merer, which can be dated to c. 2568 BCE in the reign of the Pharaoh Khufu or Cheops due to its contents. Scrolls were used by many early civilizations before the codex, or bound book with pages, was invented by the Romans and popularized by Christianity. Nevertheless, scrolls were more highly regarded than codices until well into Roman times.

== Eastern Mediterranean, West Asia and Europe ==
=== Israel ===
Scrolls were used by the Hebrews to record their religious texts, which today is referred to as the Tanakh. Some of these ancient scrolls are known today, i.e., the Dead Sea Scrolls.

=== Greece and Rome ===
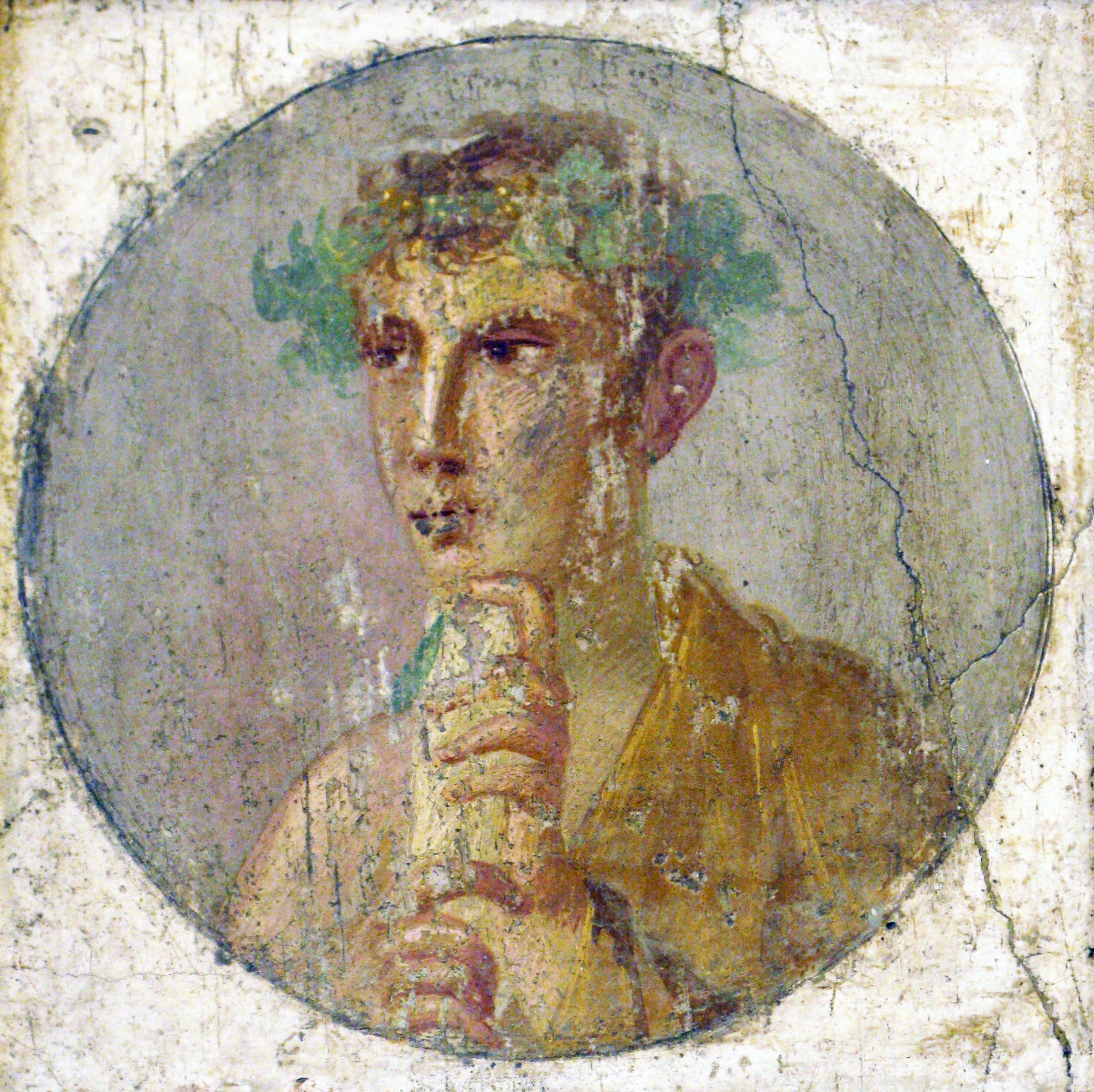
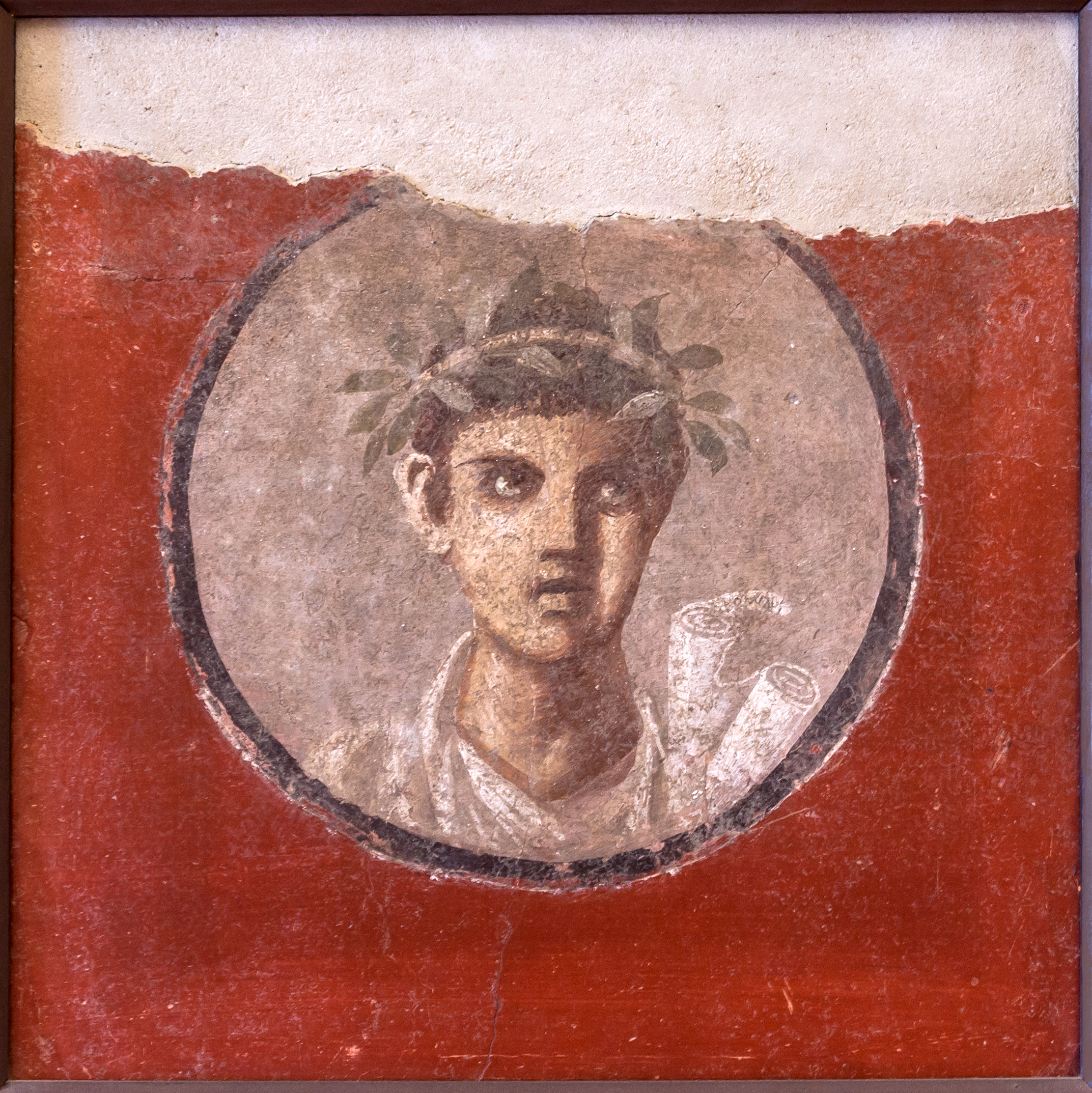
Roman portraiture frescos from Pompeii, 1st century AD, depicting two different men wearing laurel wreaths, each holding a scroll

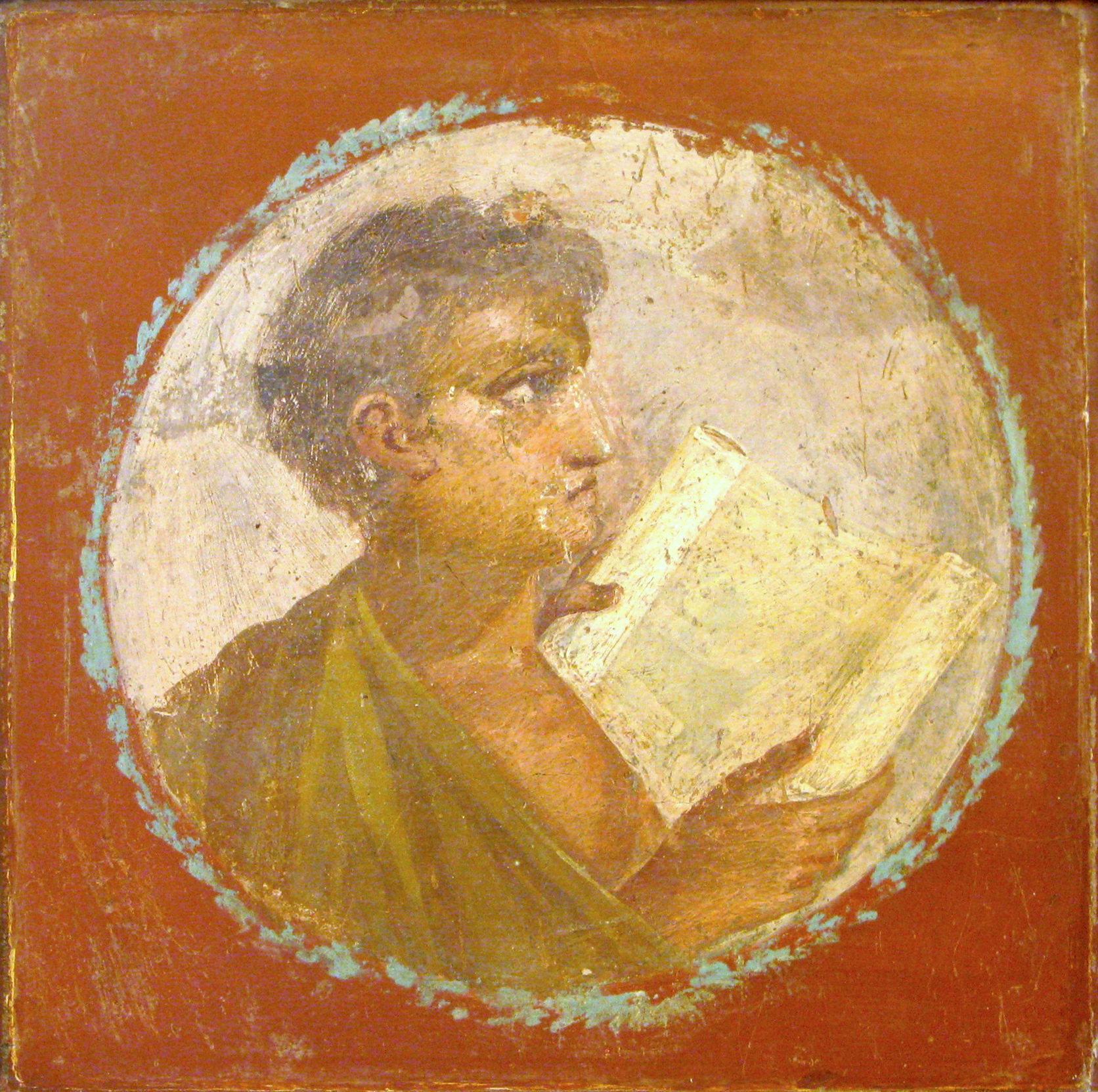
Roman portraiture fresco of a young man with a papyrus scroll, from Herculaneum, 1st century AD

Scrolls were used by the ancient Greeks. In Roman usage the scrolls were written latitudinally, usually placed on podiums with roll holders from which the rolls were unwound.

A vertically rolled form was also used, called a rotulus.

The Romans eventually found the scroll too cumbersome for lengthy works and developed the codex, which is the formal name for the modern style of book, with individual pages bound together.

=== Early Christian era ===
Scrolls continued to be used at times during the Early Church era until the Early Middle Ages, but Christianity was an early adopter of the codex. It is often thought that this reflects the background in trade of many early Christians, who were used to codex notebooks, and less attached to the form that was traditional among the Roman elite and religious Jews.

=== European Middle Ages ===
Scrolls virtually ceased to be used for books and documents in Europe during the Middle Ages, and were reintroduced for rare use in official treaties and other international documents of great significance during and after the Baroque Era of the 17th century. These were usually written on high quality vellum, and stored in elaborate silver and gold cases inscribed with names of participants. Earlier examples were written in Latin. Scrolls continued in use for administrative and accounting purposes all over Europe. In English they were often referred to as "rolls", hence the Great Rolls of the English Exchequer, and titles such as Master of the Rolls (a senior judge), still used in the 21st century. The official copy of English, now British, legislation was still printed on vellum in a roll format and stored in the Palace of Westminster until 2017, when the use of Vellum was replaced with archival paper. The Exultet roll from Southern Italy and Byzantine Joshua Scroll were prestige objects that used the old form in a revivalist spirit.

=== West and Central Asia ===
Scrolls continued in use longer in the Islamic world, often elaborately decorated in calligraphic writing that included use of gold embossing and pigments when used for the writing of the Qur'an.

=== East Asia ===
Scrolls continued in use longer in East Asian cultures like China, Korea and Japan.

The Chinese invented and perfected 'Indian Ink' for use in writing, including scrolls. Originally designed for blacking the surfaces of raised stone-carved hieroglyphics, the ink was a mixture of soot from pine smoke and lamp oil mixed with the gelatin of donkey skin and musk. The ink invented by the Chinese philosopher, Tien-Lcheu (2697 B.C.), became common by the year 1200 B.C.

Later other formats came into use in China, firstly the sutra or scripture binding, a scroll folded concertina-style, which avoids the need to unroll to find a passage in the middle. By about 1,000 CE, sheet-based formats were introduced, although scrolls continued to have a place. Traditional painting and calligraphy in East Asia is often still performed on relatively short latitudinal paper scrolls displayed vertically as a hanging scroll on a wall or horizontally and flat as a handscroll.

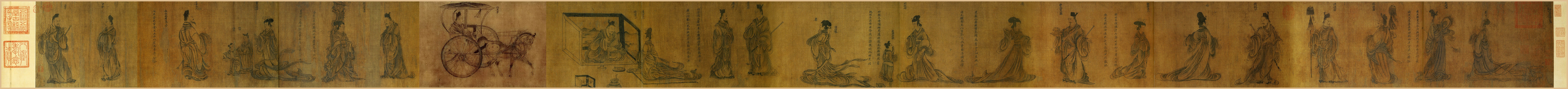
Song dynasty copy of the Wise and Benevolent Women, original by Gu Kaizhi, 13th century, Palace Museum.

== Replacement by the codex ==
The codex was a new format for reading the written word, consisting of individual pages loosely attached to each other at one side and bound with boards or cloth. It replaced the scroll over time because it overcame at least seven problems that limited the scroll's function and readability. (1) Scrolls were relatively expensive to produce. Codices could easily be written and read on both sides of the page, halving the amount of paper or vellum required to hold the same amount of content. (2) Lengthy scrolls were bulky and heavy, both because they required double the writing surface, and because they also required at least one umbilicus (rolling stick) and a scroll case for protection. The use of codices with light paper or leather covers reduced the size and weight of the book by more than half. (3) Codices were easier to reproduce. It was possible to hold open a codex with one hand and copy text with the other. For early Christendom this was an invaluable asset, as the ability to mass reproduce their gospels was in high demand. (4) Codices were easier to read. Scrolls were very long, sometimes as long as ten meters. This made them hard to hold open and read, especially scrolls that were inscribed horizontally and unrolled vertically. (5) Codices were easier to index and annotate. As a scroll was continuous, without page breaks, indexing and bookmarking was impossible. Conversely, the codex was easier to hold open, separate pages made it possible to index sections and mark a page. (6) Codices were better protected. The covers of a codex protected the fragile pages better than scrolls. This made the codex particularly attractive for important religious texts. (7) The ink on codices could, in principle, last longer than the ink on scrolls. The ink used in writing scrolls had to adhere to a surface that was constantly rolled and unrolled, so special inks were developed. Even so, ink would slowly flake from scrolls. Codices involved much less flexing of the page, so they were less prone to this problem.

The codex began to replace the scroll almost as soon as it was invented. Early Medieval Christians were some of the first to adopt the codex over the scroll. In Egypt by the fifth century CE the codex outnumbered the scroll or roll by ten to one based on surviving examples, and by the sixth century the scroll had almost vanished from use as a vehicle for literature.

However, in other places the scroll lingered. Monarchs used "statute rolls" to record important legislation until well into the Middle Ages. Scrolls were also commonly used in theater productions, a practice from which the term "role" (of an actor) was coined.

== Modern era ==
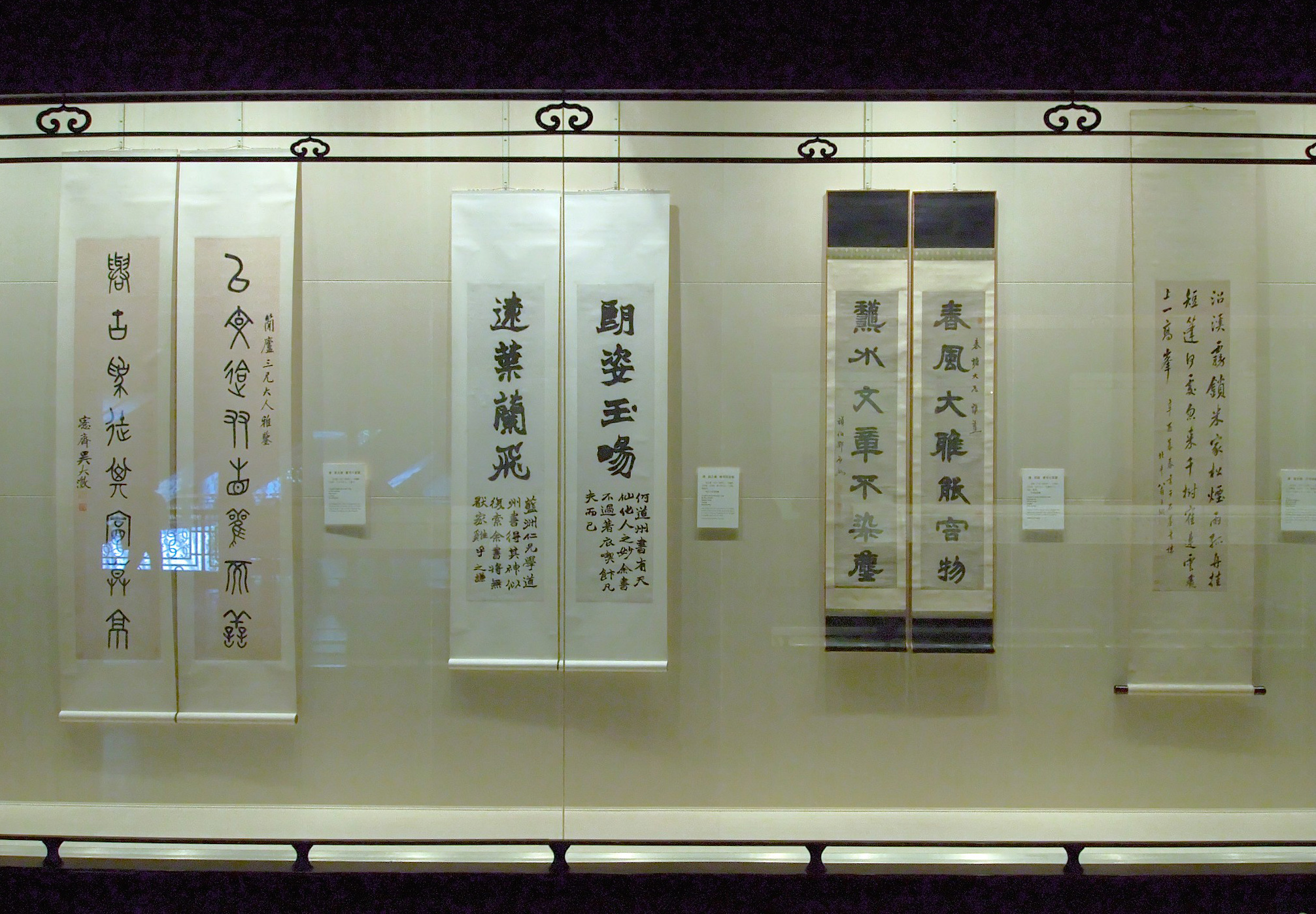
Hanging scrolls of calligraphy on display, Shanghai

Torah scrolls are still used today in Jewish religious observance with almost insignificant changes despite the thousands of years in practice.

Some cultures use scrolls as ceremonial texts or for decoration—such as a hanging scroll—without any obvious division of the text into columns. In some scroll-using cultures painted illustrations were used as header decorations above the text columns, either in a continuous band or broken into scenes above either a single or double column of text.

One of the few modern texts the original of which was written on what is effectively a scroll is the manuscript of Jack Kerouac's On the Road, typed onto what he called "the scroll", made of taped-together sheets of paper. Although it was more for utilitarian than ceremonial purposes, the Marquis de Sade's 120 Days of Sodom, which he intended to be the filthiest book imaginable, is written on a scroll.

The verb "to scroll" is much used in the age of screen displays—computer displays, rolling credits in films and so on—with the screen filled with text moving (scrolling) up or down or sideways, appearing at one edge of the display and disappearing at the other as if being unrolled from one side of a scroll and rolled up at the other.

== See also ==
- History of writing
- History of books
