= East Asian painting =

East Asian painting may refer to:

- Chinese painting
- Korean painting
- Japanese painting
