= Rotulus =

Type of scroll

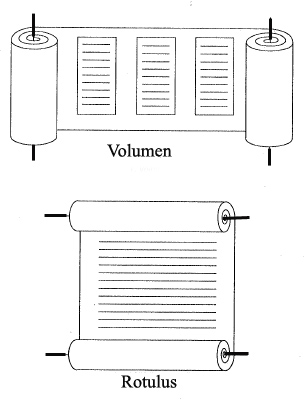
Volumen and Rotulus

A rotulus (plural rotuli) or rotula (pl. rotulae), often referred to as a "vertical roll," is a long and narrow strip of writing material, historically papyrus or parchment, that is wound around a wooden axle or rod. Rotuli are unwound vertically so that the writing runs parallel to the rod, unlike the other kind of roll, called a scroll, whose writing runs perpendicular to the rod in multiple columns.

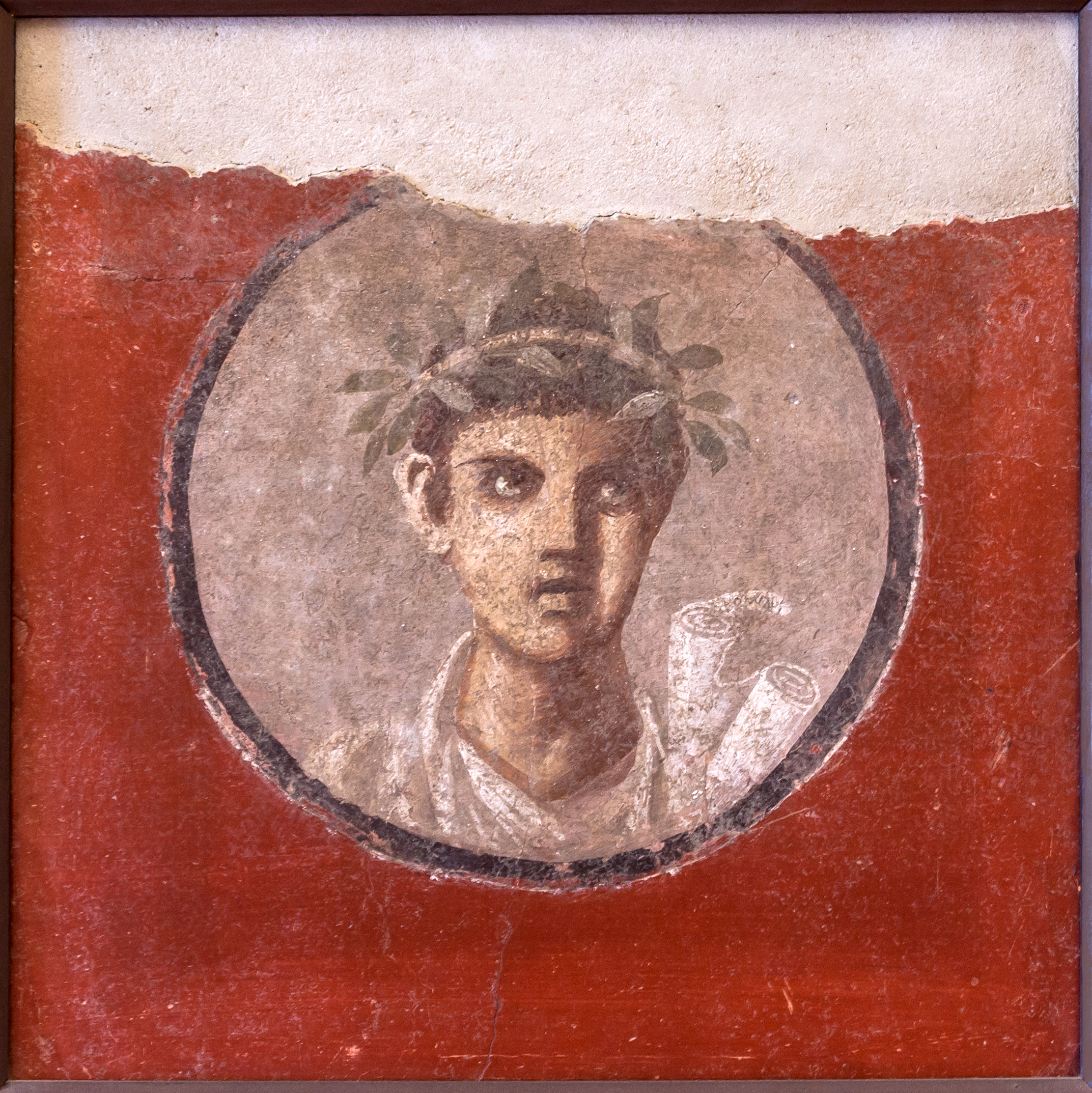
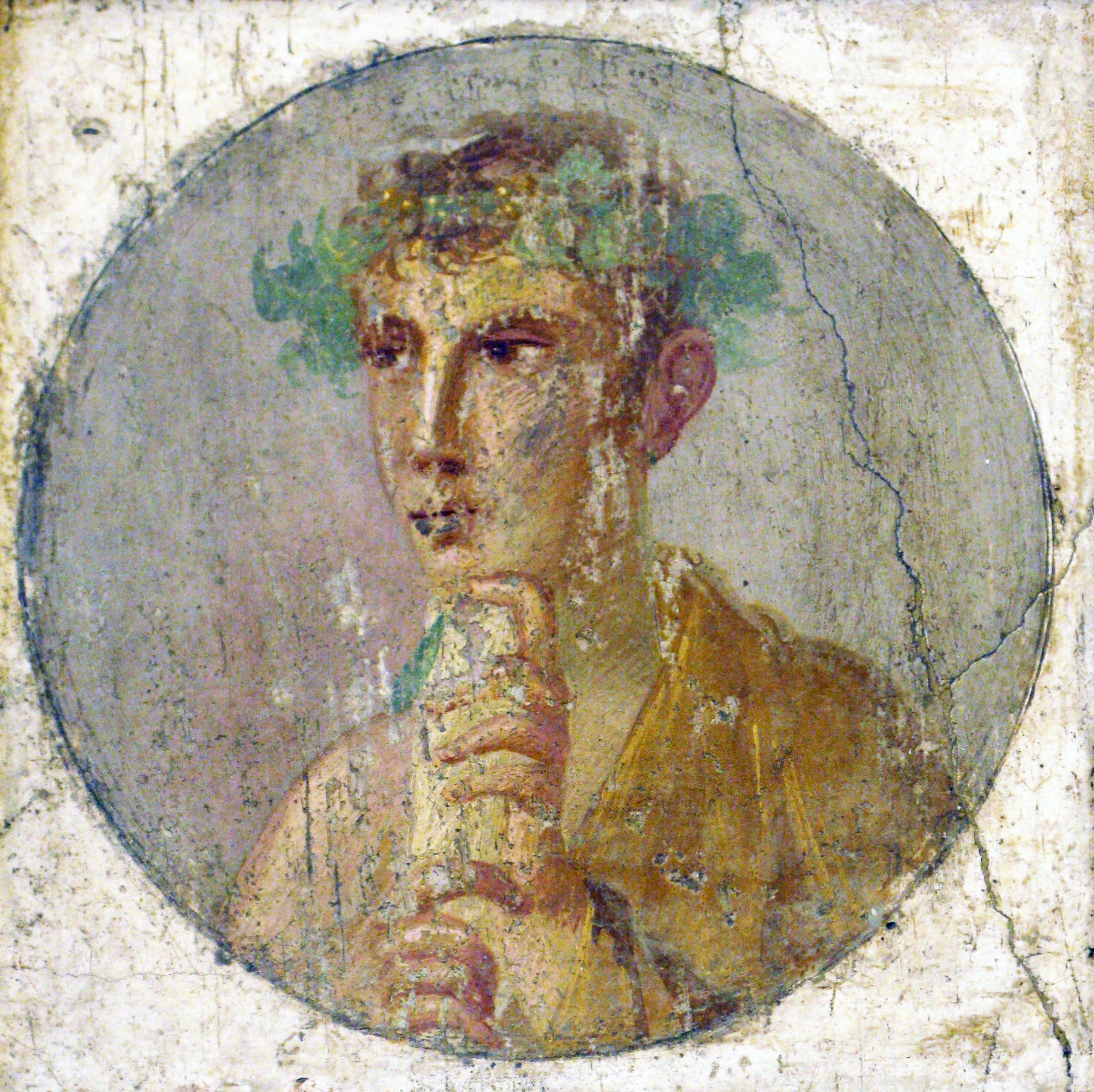
Roman portraiture frescos from Pompeii, 1st century AD, depicting two different men wearing laurel wreaths, each holding an ancient book.

Rotuli were used to house legal records in Europe (from which is still derived the title of the judicial functionary denominated the "Master of the Rolls") and in the Byzantine Empire.

Papyrus 136 (𝔓^{136}) is a rare example of a rotulus used, front and back, as a manuscript for a portion of the New Testament.

Rotuli also have been used as liturgical manuscripts, e.g., those used for chanting the Exultet.

Additionally, mortuary rolls, i.e., documents memorializing the names of all the deceased members of a monastery or other institution, which were banded together and circulated so that they could mutually pray for the repose of each other's decedents.

== See also ==
- Codex
- History of scrolls
- History of books
