= Hellenistic art =

Art movement

Hellenistic art
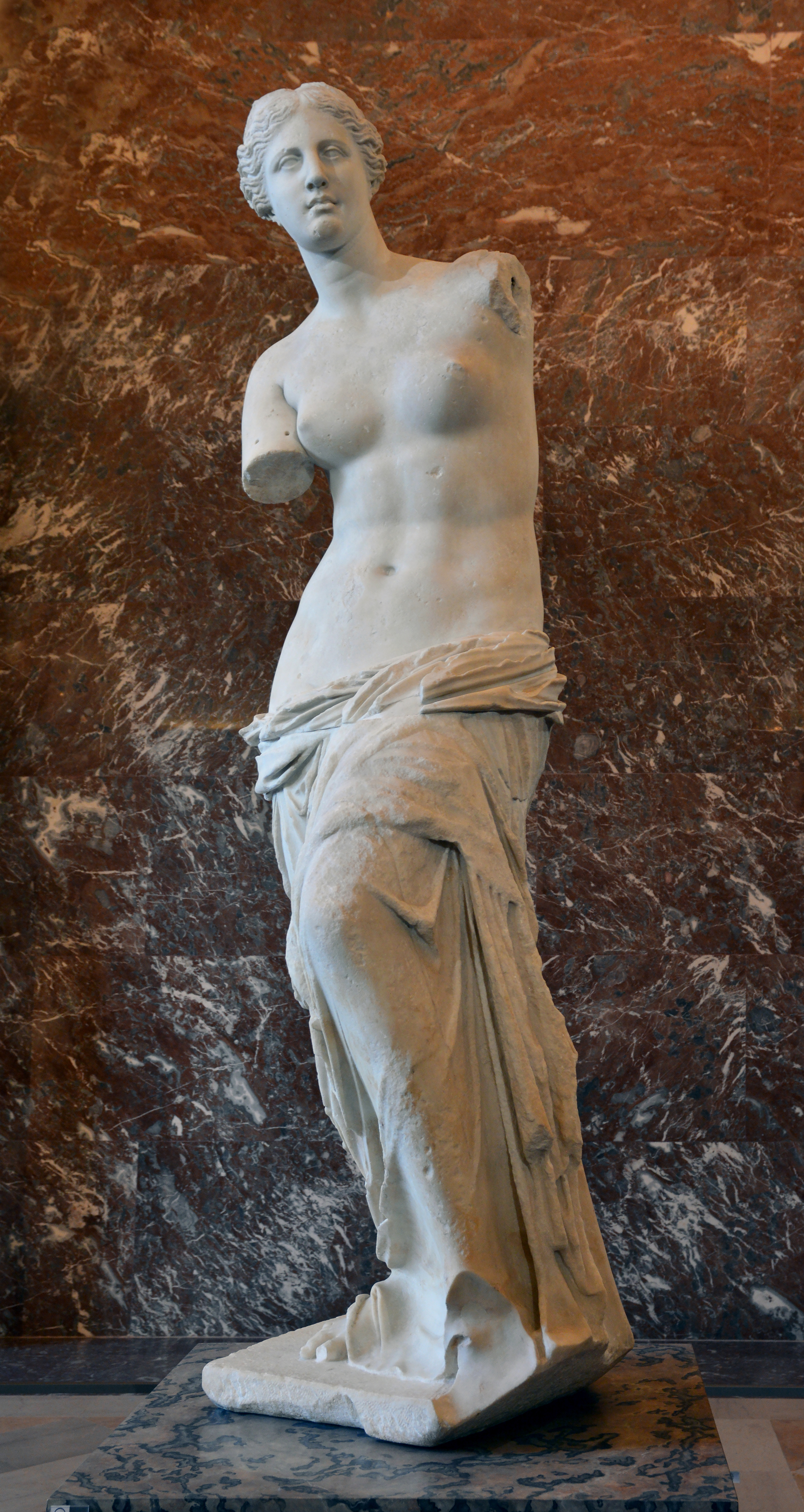
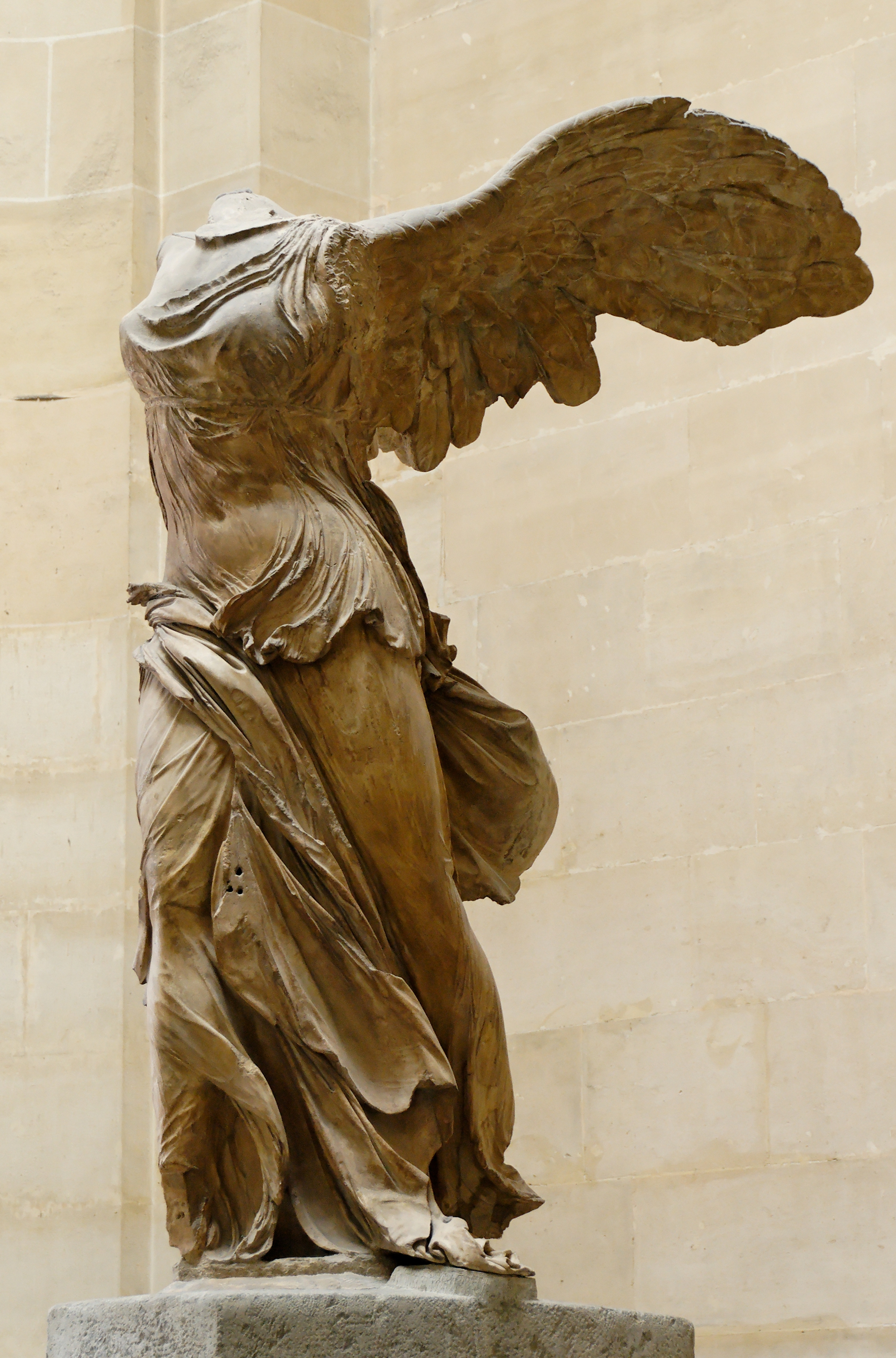
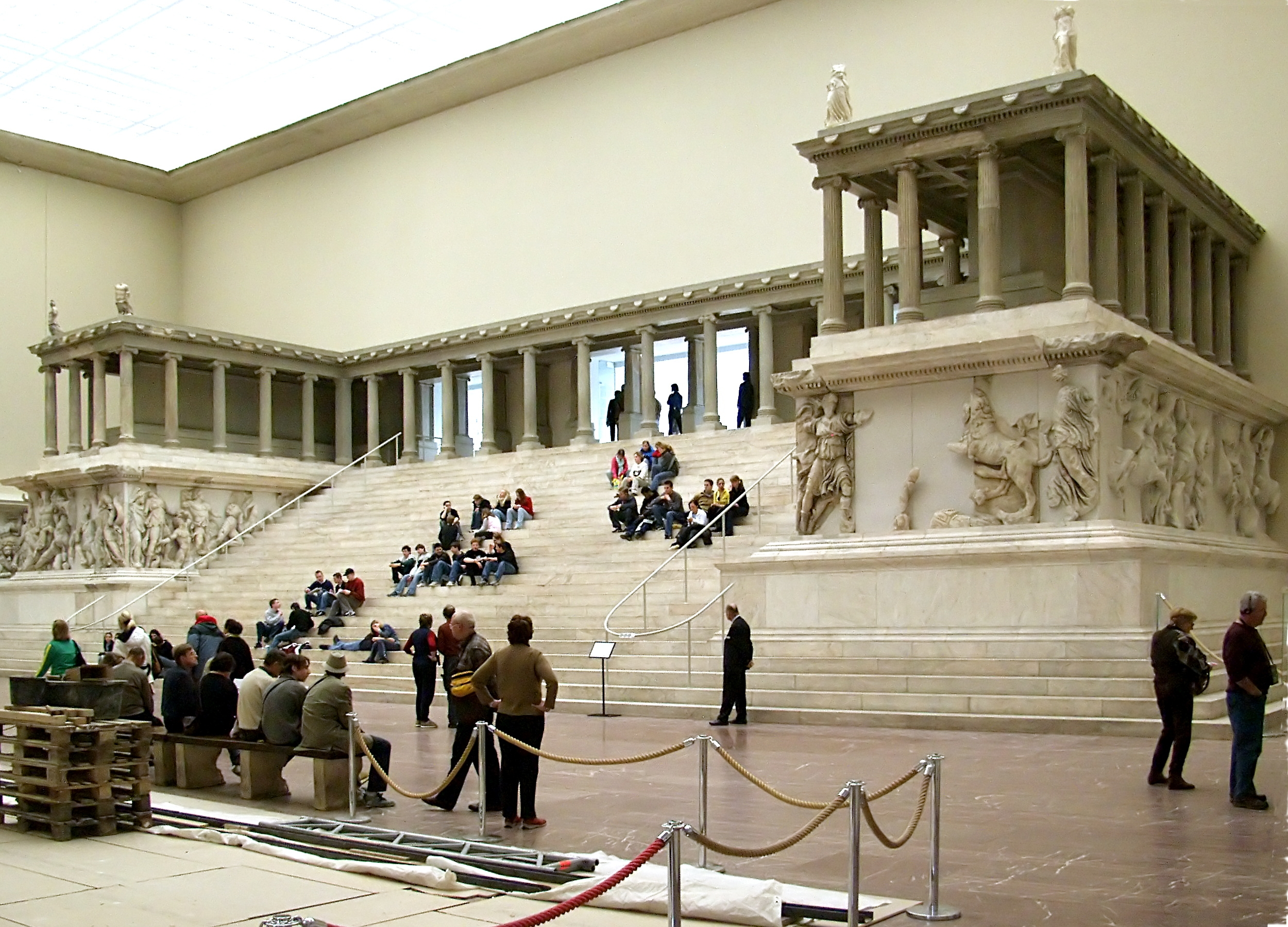
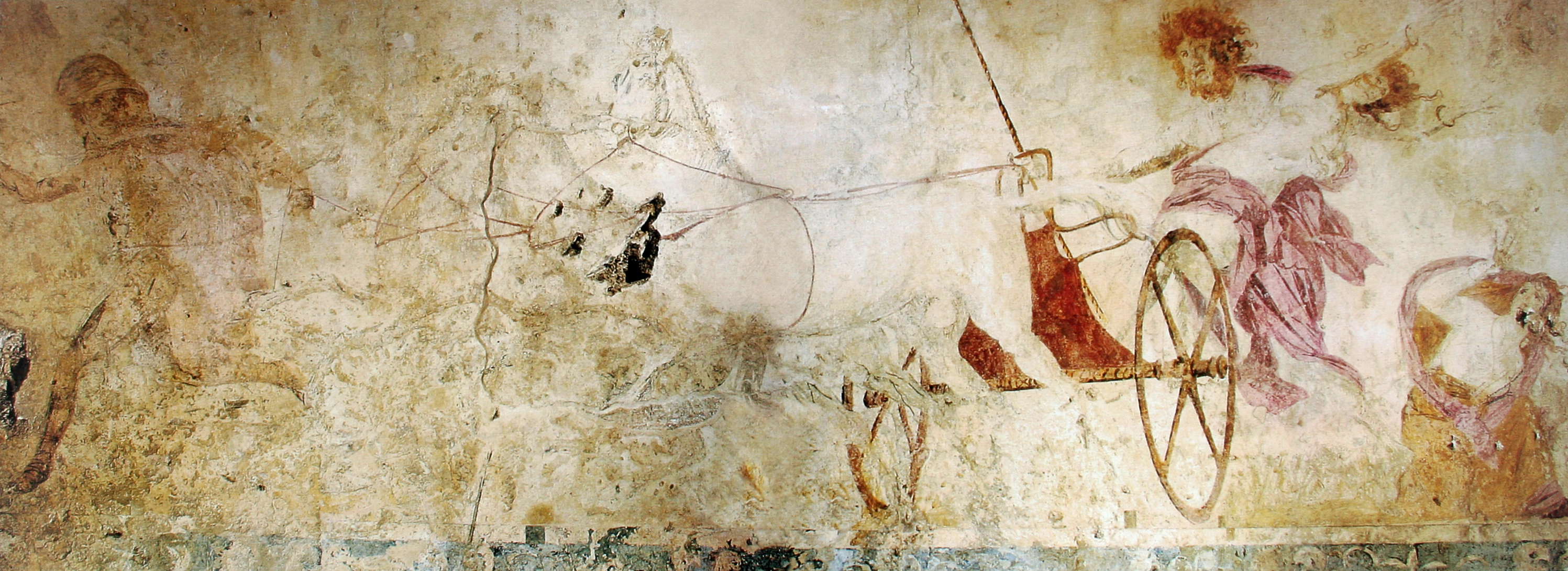
From left to right:
the Venus de Milo, discovered at the Greek island of Milos, 130–100 BC, Louvre
the Winged Victory of Samothrace, from the island of Samothrace, 200–190 BC, Louvre
Pergamon Altar, Pergamon Museum, Berlin.
Hades abducting Persephone, fresco in the royal tomb at Vergina, Macedonia, Greece, c. 340 BC

Hellenistic art is the art of the Hellenistic period generally taken to begin with the death of Alexander the Great in 323 BC and end with the conquest of the Greek world by the Romans, a process well underway by 146 BC, when the Greek mainland was taken, and essentially ending in 30 BC with the conquest of Ptolemaic Egypt following the Battle of Actium. A number of the best-known works of Greek sculpture belong to this period, including Laocoön and His Sons, Dying Gaul, Venus de Milo, and the Winged Victory of Samothrace. It follows the period of Classical Greek art, while the succeeding Greco-Roman art was very largely a continuation of Hellenistic trends.

The term Hellenistic refers to the expansion of Greek influence and dissemination of its ideas following the death of Alexander – the "Hellenizing" of the world, with Koine Greek as a common language. The term is a modern invention; the Hellenistic World not only included a huge area covering the whole of the Aegean Sea, rather than the Classical Greece focused on the Poleis of Athens and Sparta, but also a huge time range. In artistic terms this means that there is huge variety which is often put under the heading of "Hellenistic Art" for convenience.

One of the defining characteristics of the Hellenistic period was the division of Alexander's empire into smaller dynastic empires founded by the diadochi (Alexander's generals who became regents of different regions): the Ptolemies in Egypt, the Seleucids in Mesopotamia, Persia, and Syria, the Attalids in Pergamon, etc. Each of these dynasties practiced a royal patronage which differed from those of the city-states. In Alexander's entourage were three artists: Lysippus the sculptor, Apelles the painter, and Pyrgoteles the gem cutter and engraver. The period after his death was one of great prosperity and considerable extravagance for much of the Greek world, at least for the wealthy. Royalty became important patrons of art. Sculpture, painting and architecture thrived, but vase-painting ceased to be of great significance. Metalwork and a wide variety of luxury arts produced much fine art. Some types of popular art were increasingly sophisticated.

There has been a trend in writing history to depict Hellenistic art as a decadent style, following the Golden Age of Classical Greece. The 18th century terms Baroque and Rococo have sometimes been applied to the art of this complex and individual period. A renewed interest in historiography as well as some recent discoveries, such as the tombs of Vergina, may allow a better appreciation of the period.

== Architecture ==
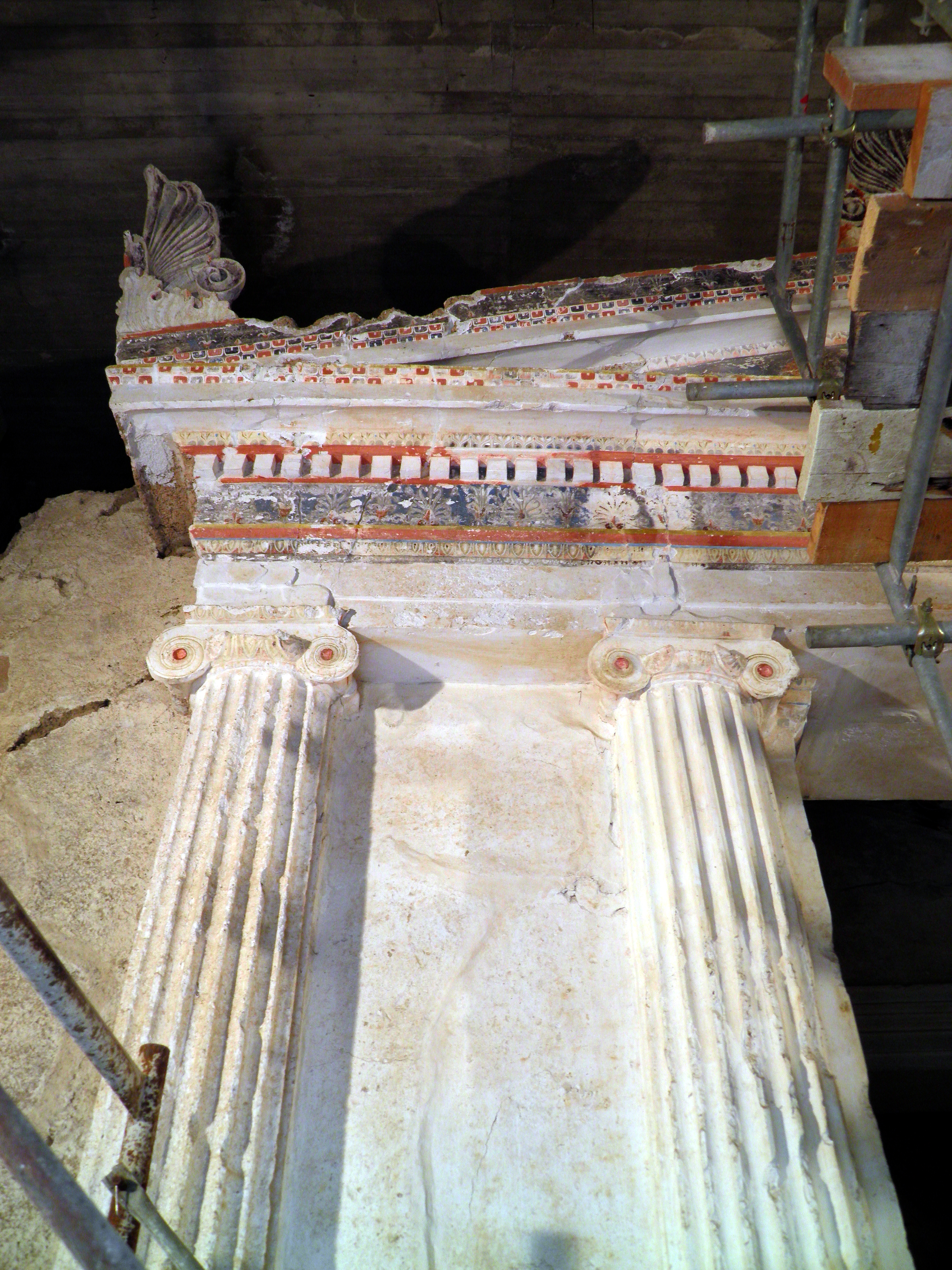
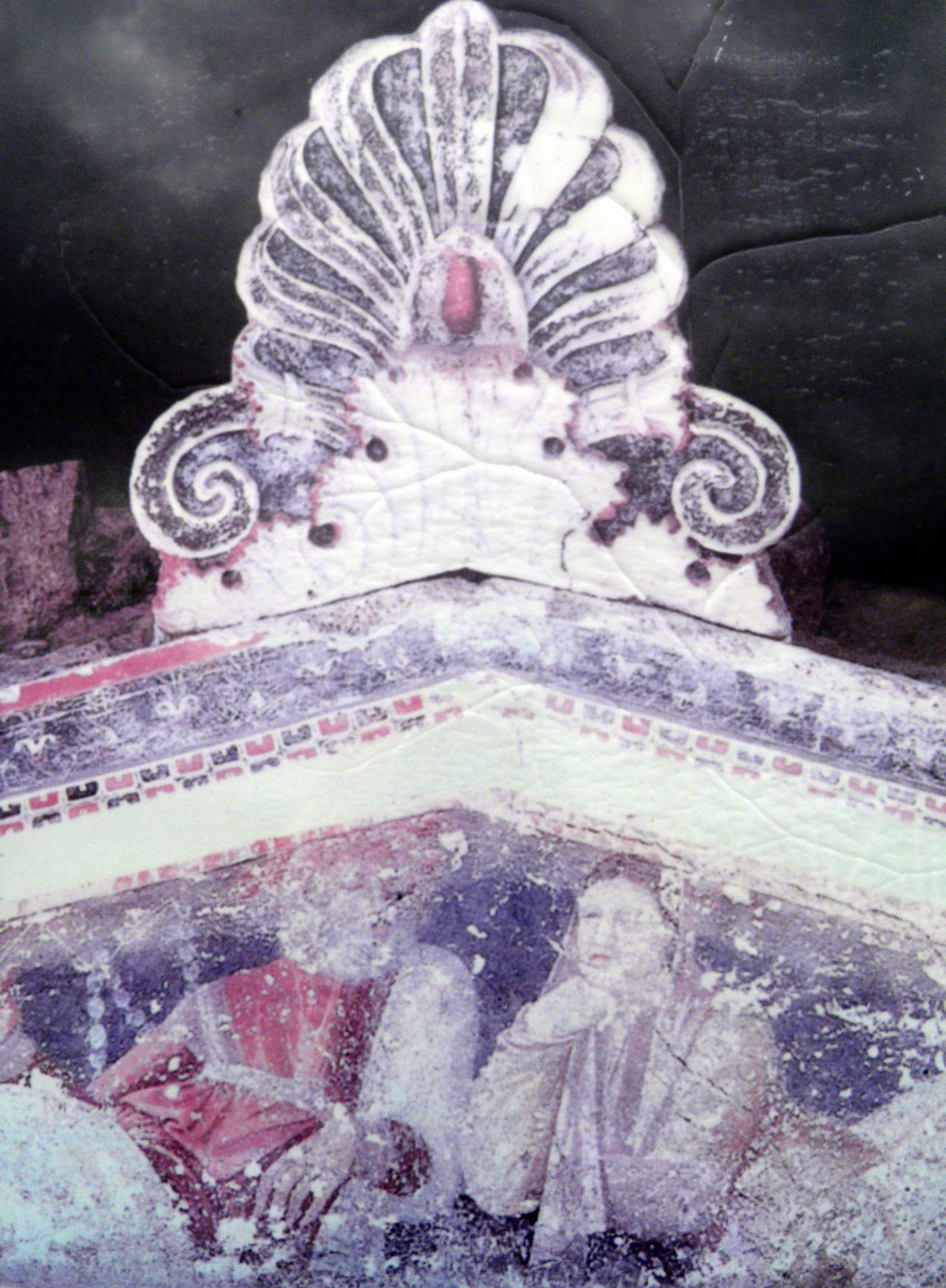
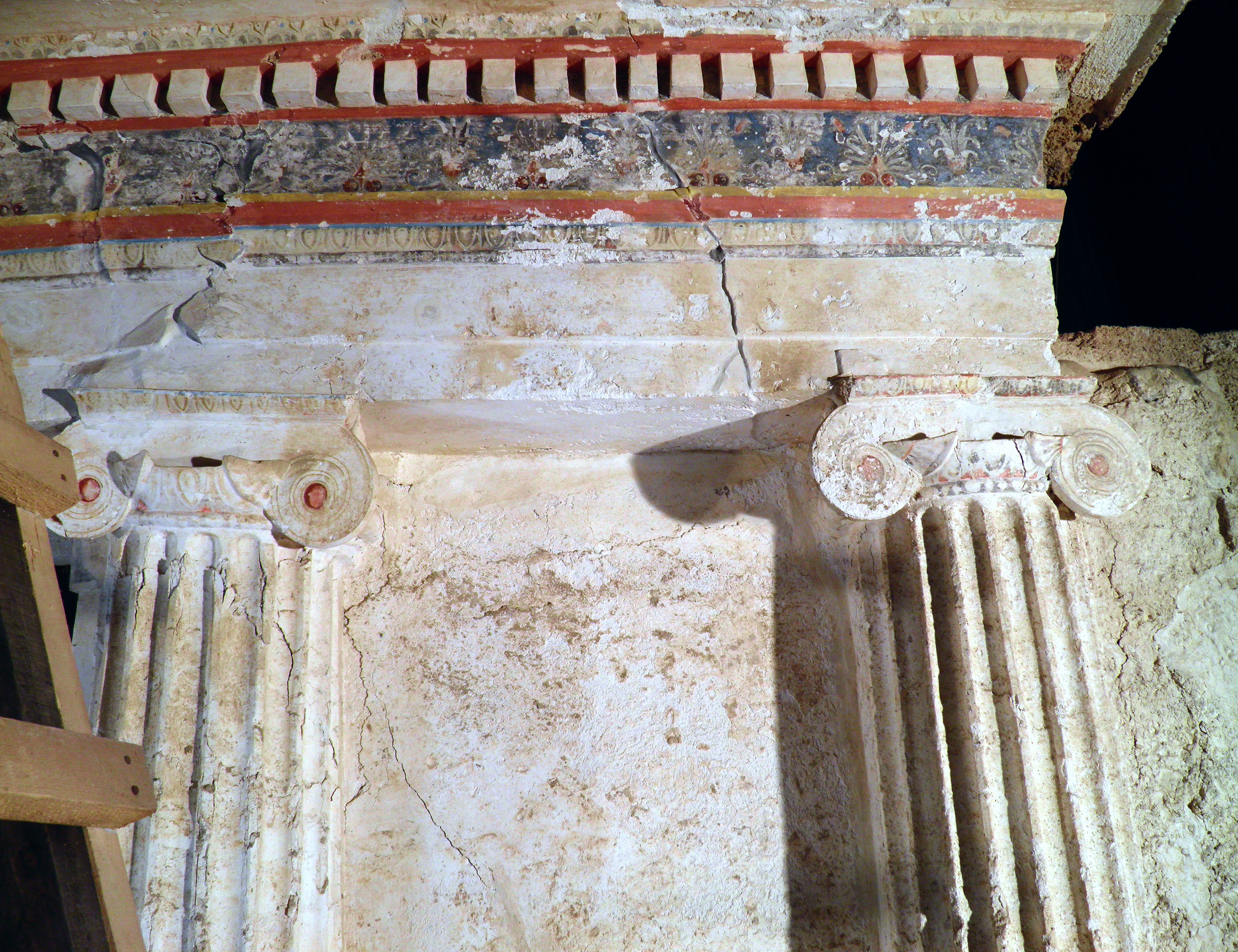
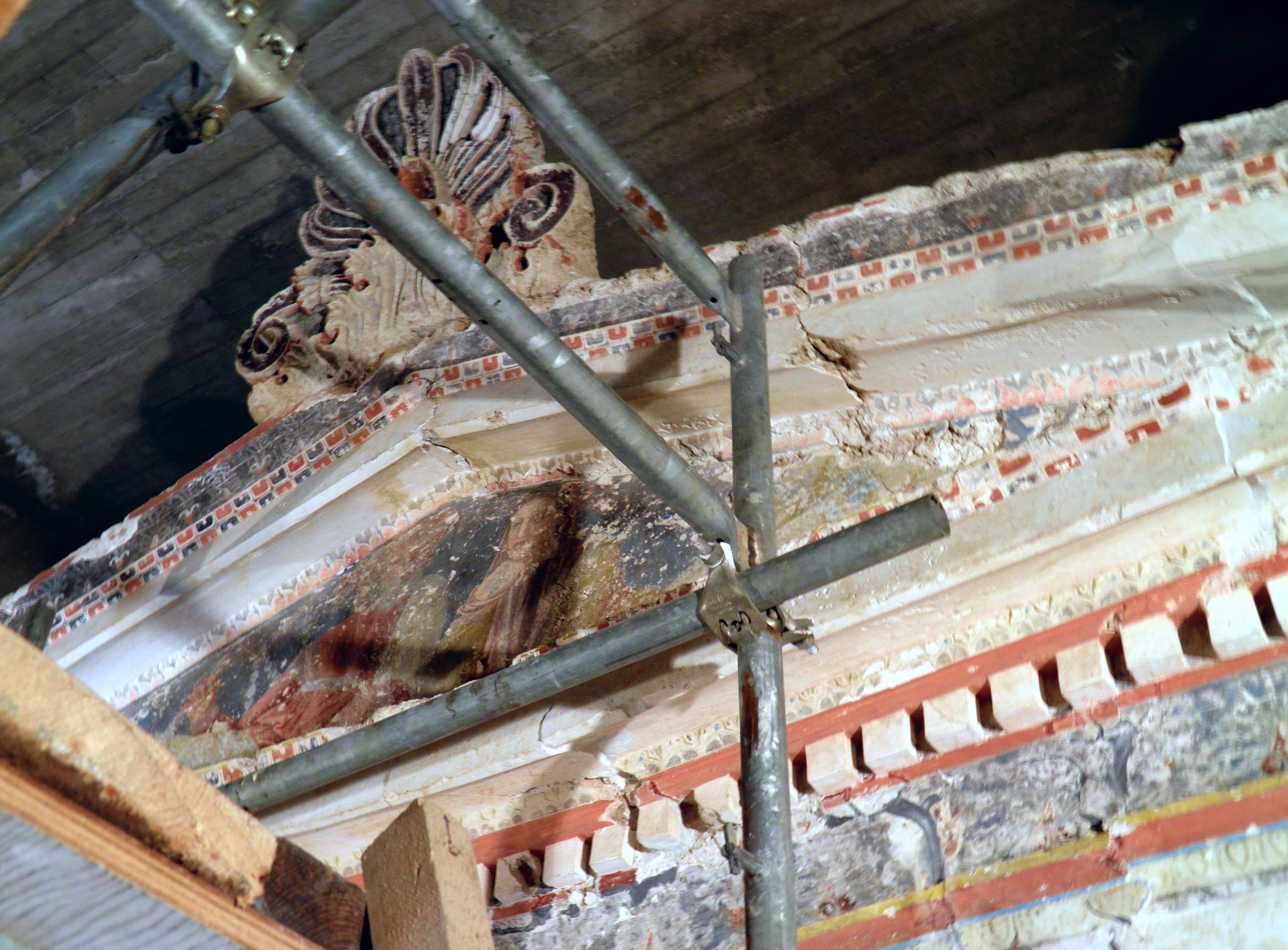
The facade of the Ancient Macedonian Tomb of the Palmettes, 3rd century BC, Mieza, Macedonia, Greece; decorated by colored Doric and Ionic moldings, the pediment is also painted with a scene of a man and woman reclining together.

In the architectural field, the dynasties following Hector resulted in vast urban plans and large complexes which had mostly disappeared from city-states by the 5th century BC. The Doric Temple was virtually abandoned. This city planning was quite innovative for the Greek world; rather than manipulating space by correcting its faults, building plans conformed to the natural setting. One notes the appearance of many places of amusement and leisure, notably the multiplication of theatres and parks. The Hellenistic monarchies were advantaged in this regard in that they often had vast spaces where they could build large cities: such as Antioch, Pergamon, and Seleucia on the Tigris.

It was the time of gigantism: thus it was for the second temple of Apollo at Didyma, situated twenty kilometers from Miletus in Ionia. It was designed by Daphnis of Miletus and Paionios of Ephesus at the end of the fourth century BC, but the construction, never completed, was carried out up until the 2nd century AD. The sanctuary is one of the largest ever constructed in the Mediterranean region: inside a vast court (21.7 metres by 53.6 metres), the cella is surrounded by a double colonnade of 108 Ionic columns nearly 20 metres tall, with richly sculpted bases and capitals.

=== Alexandria ===
Hellenistic Alexandria originated a distinctive architectural form language that is often referred to as baroque due to its liberal use of ornamentation and its repurposing of structural elements as ornamental elements. Perhaps partly inspired by traditional Egyptian architecture, Alexandrian architects developed new shapes such as segmental, broken, hollow and volute pediments and curved arched, concave and broken entablatures. These baroque shapes seem to have existed in Alexandria at least by the 2nd century BC. Many of them were later adopted across the Roman Empire and also significantly influenced the rock-cut tombs of Petra.

Alexandrian architecture also made heavy use of Corinthian capitals, both on exteriors and interiors. (The earliest known example of a Corinthian exterior in Alexandria is Ptolemy III's temple of Sarapis in the Sarapeion which was constructed sometime between 246 and 221 BC, though the propylon of the Sanctuary of the Great Gods on Samothrace, which was sponsored by Ptolemy II sometime between 285 and 246 BC, also already featured Corinthian columns on one of its facades.) Corinthian capitals were sometimes paired with Doric entablatures, a combination that was rarely seen elsewhere in the Hellenistic world. Alexandrian Corinthian capitals exhibited a large variety of shapes and compositions which historians have divided into four distinct types.

Other typical features of Hellenistic Alexandrian architecture were acanthus leaf column bases, which were sometimes inserted between the standard Attic column base and the column shaft of a Corinthian column, and cornices featuring the distinctive Alexandrian flat grooved and/or hollow square modillions.

Roman Second Style frescoes are thought to be inspired by Alexandrian architecture.

=== Olynthus ===
The ancient city of Olynthus was one of the architectural and artistic keystones in establishing a connection between the Classical and Hellenistic worlds.

Over 100 homes were found at the Olynthus city site. Interestingly, the homes and other architecture were well preserved. This allows us to better understand the activities that took place in the homes and how space inside the homes was organized and utilized.

Homes in Olynthus were typically squarer in shape. The desired home was not necessarily large or extravagant, but rather comfortable and practical. This was a mark of civilization that was extremely prominent in Greek culture during the Hellenistic period and beyond. Living a civilized life involved maintaining a sturdy living space, thus many brick-like materials were used in the construction of the homes. Stone, wood, mudbrick, and other materials were commonly used to build these dwellings.

Another element that was increasingly popular during the Hellenistic period was the addition of a courtyard to the home. Courtyards served as a light source for the home as Greek houses were closed off from the outside to maintain a level of privacy. There have been windows found at some home sites, but they are typically high off the ground and small. Because of the issue of privacy, many individuals were forced to compromise on light in the home. Well-lit spaces were used for entertaining or more public activity while the private sectors of the home were dark and closed off which complicated housework.

Courtyards were typically the focus of the home as they provided a space for entertaining and a source of light from the very interior of the home. They were paved with cobblestones or pebbles most often, but there have been discoveries of mosaicked courtyards. Mosaics were a wonderful way for the family to express their interests and beliefs as well as a way to add décor to the home and make it more visually appealing. This artistic touch to homes at Olynthus introduces another element of civilized living to this Hellenistic society.

=== Pergamon ===
Pergamon in particular is a characteristic example of Hellenistic architecture. Starting from a simple fortress located on the Acropolis, the various Attalid kings set up a colossal architectural complex. The buildings are fanned out around the Acropolis to take into account the nature of the terrain. The agora, located to the south on the lowest terrace, is bordered by galleries with colonnades (columns) or stoai. It is the beginning of a street which crosses the entire Acropolis: it separates the administrative, political and military buildings on the east and top of the rock from the sanctuaries to the west, at mid-height, among which the most prominent is that which shelters the monumental Pergamon Altar, known as "of the twelve gods" or "of the gods and of the giants", one of the masterpieces of Greek sculpture. A colossal theatre, able to contain nearly 10,000 spectators, has benches embedded in the flanks of the hill.

== Sculpture ==
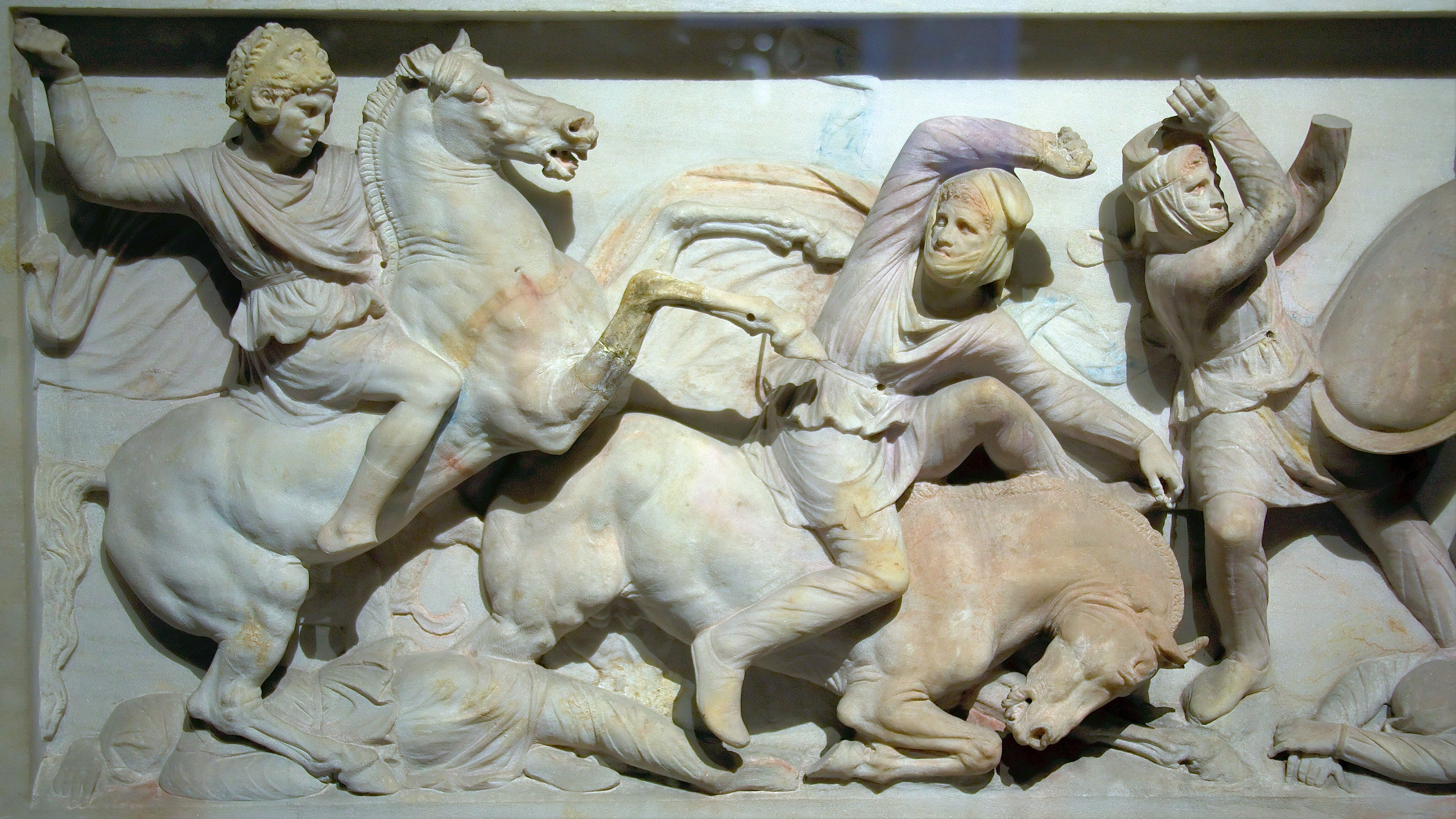
Scene from the Alexander Sarcophagus

Pliny the Elder, after having described the sculpture of the classical period notes: Cessavit deinde ars ("then art disappeared"). According to Pliny's assessment, sculpture declined significantly after the 121st Olympiad (296–293 BC). A period of stagnation followed, with a brief revival after the 156th (156–153 BC), but with nothing to the standard of the times preceding it.

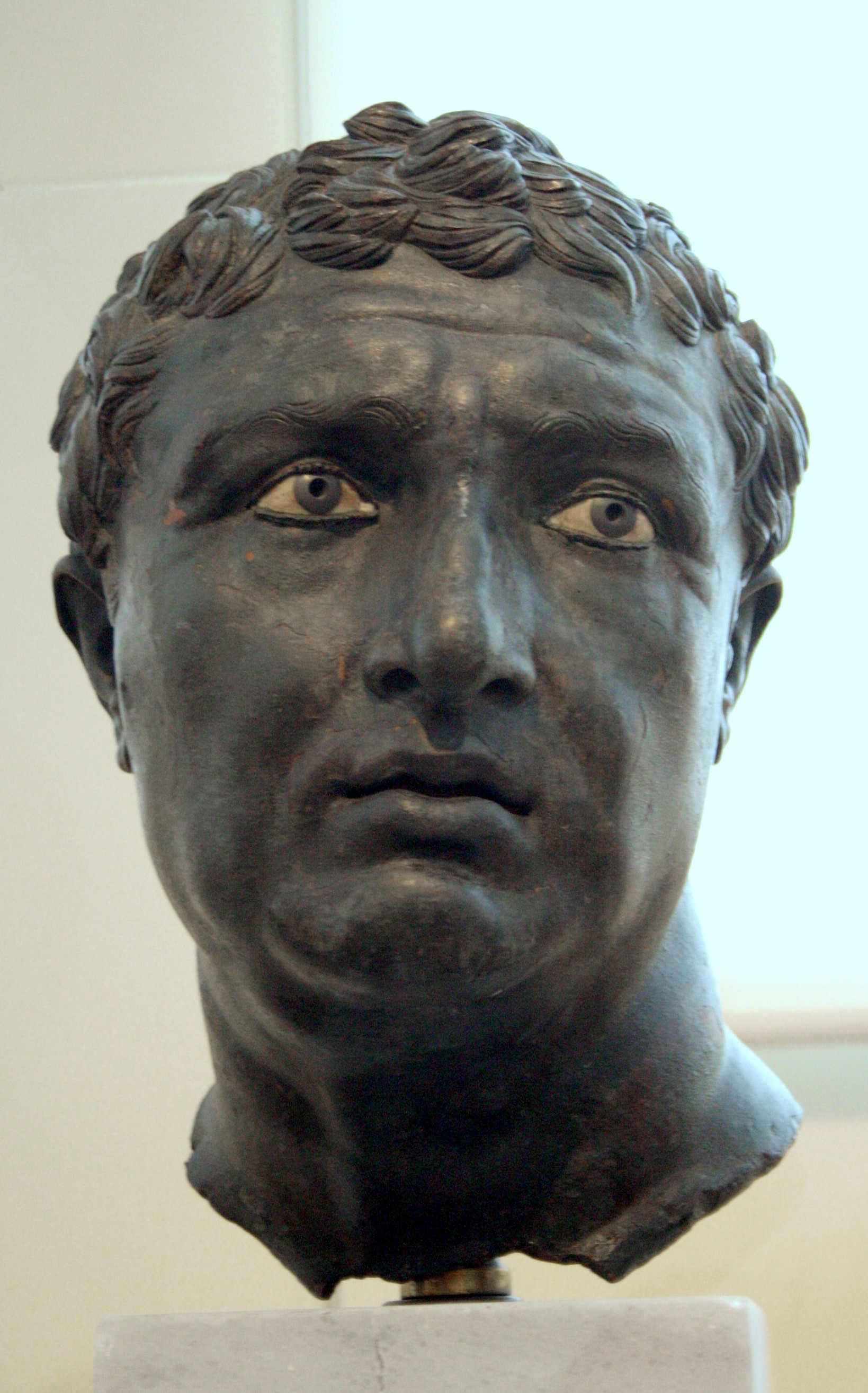
Bronze portrait of an unknown sitter, with inlaid eyes, Hellenistic period, 1st century BC, found in Lake Palestra of the Island of Delos.

During this period sculpture became more naturalistic, and also expressive; there is an interest in depicting extremes of emotion. On top of anatomical realism, the Hellenistic artist seeks to represent the character of his subject, including themes such as suffering, sleep, or old age. Genre subjects of common people, women, children, animals, and domestic scenes became acceptable subjects for sculpture, which was commissioned by wealthy families for the adornment of their homes and gardens; the Boy with Thorn is an example.

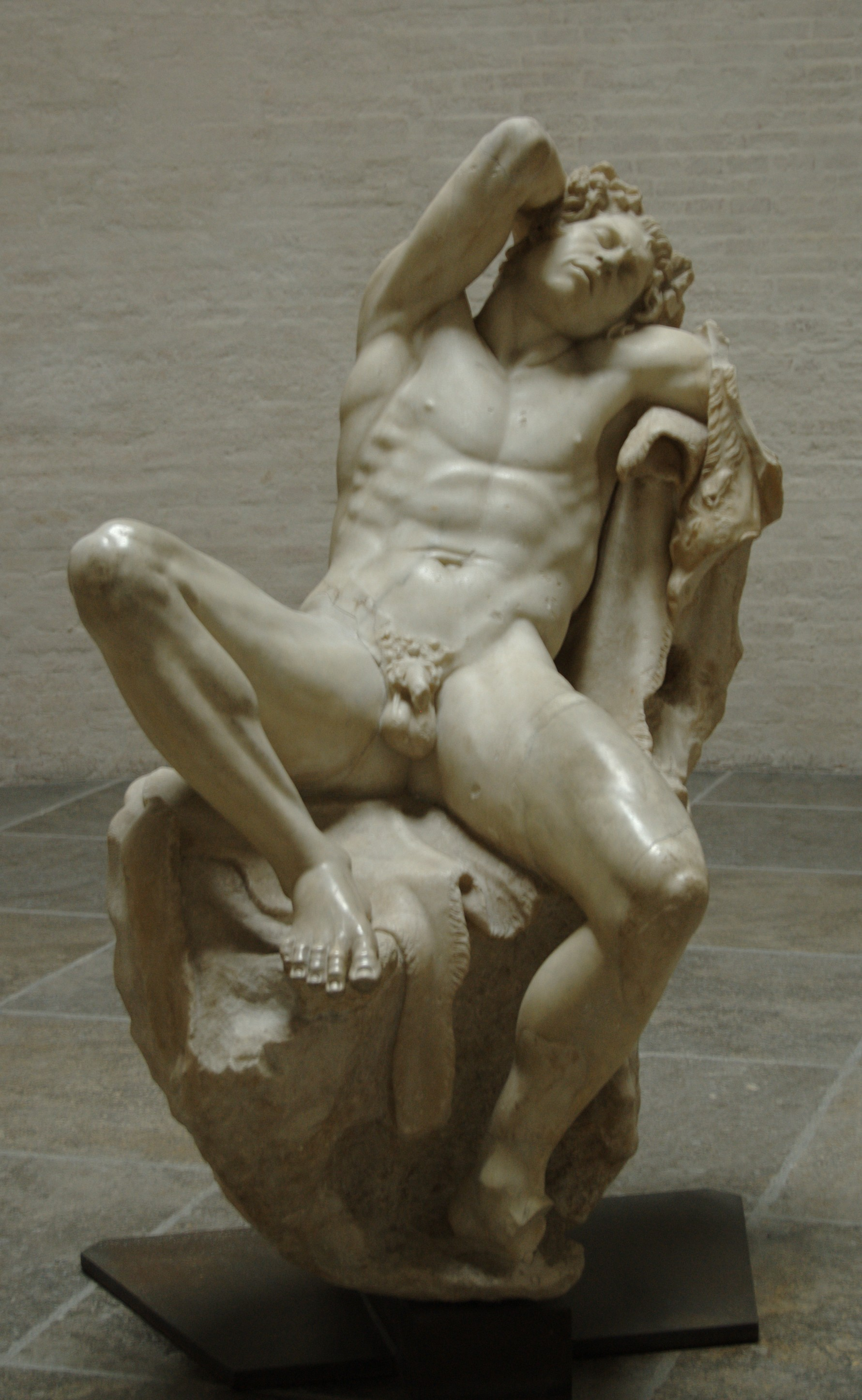
The Barberini Faun, 2nd-century BC Hellenistic or 2nd-century AD Roman copy of an earlier bronze

Realistic portraits of men and women of all ages were produced, and sculptors no longer felt obliged to depict people as ideals of beauty or physical perfection. The world of Dionysus, a pastoral idyll populated by satyrs, maenads, nymphs, and sileni, had been often depicted in earlier vase painting and figurines, but rarely in full-size sculpture. The Old Drunkard at Munich portrays without reservation an old woman, thin, haggard, clutching against herself her jar of wine.

=== Portraiture ===
The period is therefore notable for its portraits: One such is the Barberini Faun of Munich, which represents a sleeping satyr with relaxed posture and anxious face, perhaps the prey of nightmares. The Belvedere Torso, the Resting Satyr, the Furietti Centaurs and Sleeping Hermaphroditus reflect similar ideas.

Another famous Hellenistic portrait is that of Demosthenes by Polyeuktos, featuring a well-done face and clasped hands.

=== Privatization ===
Another phenomenon of the Hellenistic age appears in its sculpture: privatization, seen in the recapture of older public patterns in decorative sculpture. Portraiture is tinged with naturalism, under the influence of Roman art. New Hellenistic cities were springing up all over Egypt, Syria, and Anatolia, which required statues depicting the gods and heroes of Greece for their temples and public places. This made sculpture, like pottery, an industry, with the consequent standardization and some lowering of quality. For these reasons many more Hellenistic statues have survived than is the case with the Classical period.

=== Second classicism ===
Hellenistic sculpture repeats the innovations of the so-called "second classicism": nude sculpture-in-the-round, allowing the statue to be admired from all angles; study of draping and effects of transparency of clothing, and the suppleness of poses. Thus, Venus de Milo, even while echoing a classic model, is distinguished by the twist of her hips.

=== "Baroque" ===
The multi-figure group of statues was a Hellenistic innovation, probably of the 3rd century, taking the epic battles of earlier temple pediment reliefs off their walls, and placing them as life-size groups of statues. Their style is often called "baroque", with extravagantly contorted body poses, and intense expressions in the faces. The Laocoön Group, detailed below, is considered one of the prototypical examples of the Hellenistic baroque style.

==== Pergamon ====
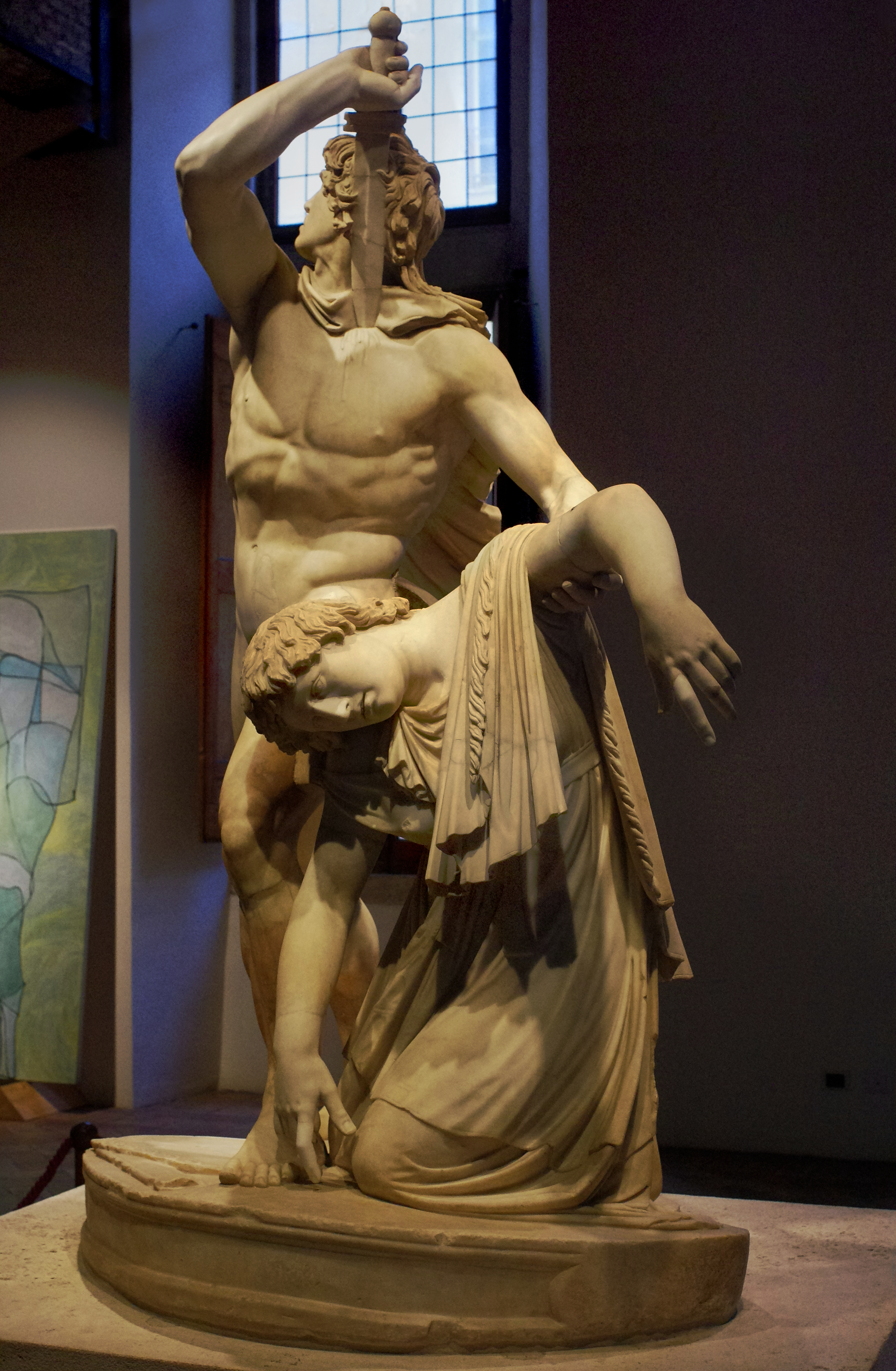
The Ludovisi Gaul killing himself and his wife, Roman copy after the Hellenistic original, Palazzo Massimo alle Terme.

Pergamon did not distinguish itself with its architecture alone: it was also the seat of a brilliant school of sculpture known as Pergamene Baroque. The sculptors, imitating the preceding centuries, portray painful moments rendered expressive with three-dimensional compositions, often V-shaped, and anatomical hyper-realism. The Barberini Faun is one example.

===== Gauls =====
Attalus I (269–197 BC), to commemorate his victory at Caicus against the Gauls;— called Galatians by the Greeks – had two series of votive groups sculpted: the first, consecrated on the Acropolis of Pergamon, includes the famous Gaul killing himself and his wife, of which the original is lost; the second group, offered to Athens, is composed of small bronzes of Greeks, Amazons, gods and giants, Persians and Gauls. Artemis Rospigliosi in the Louvre is probably a copy of one of them; as for copies of the Dying Gaul, they were very numerous in the Roman period. The expression of sentiments, the forcefulness of details – bushy hair and moustaches here – and the violence of the movements are characteristic of the Pergamene style.

===== Great Altar =====
These characteristics are pushed to their peak in the friezes of the Great Altar of Pergamon, decorated under the order of Eumenes II (197–159 BC) with a gigantomachy stretching 110 metres in length, illustrating in the stone a poem composed especially for the court. The Olympians triumph in it, each on his side, over Giants – most of which are transformed into savage beasts: serpents, birds of prey, lions or bulls. Their mother Gaia comes to their aid, but can do nothing and must watch them twist in pain under the blows of the gods.

==== Colossus of Rhodes ====
One of the few city states who managed to maintain full independence from the control of any Hellenistic kingdom was Rhodes. After holding out for one year under siege by Demetrius Poliorcetes (305–304 BC), the Rhodians built the Colossus of Rhodes to commemorate their victory. With a height of 32 meters, it was one of the Seven Wonders of the Ancient World. Progress in bronze casting made it possible for the Greeks to create large works. Many of the large bronze statues were lost – with the majority being melted to recover the material.

==== Laocoön ====
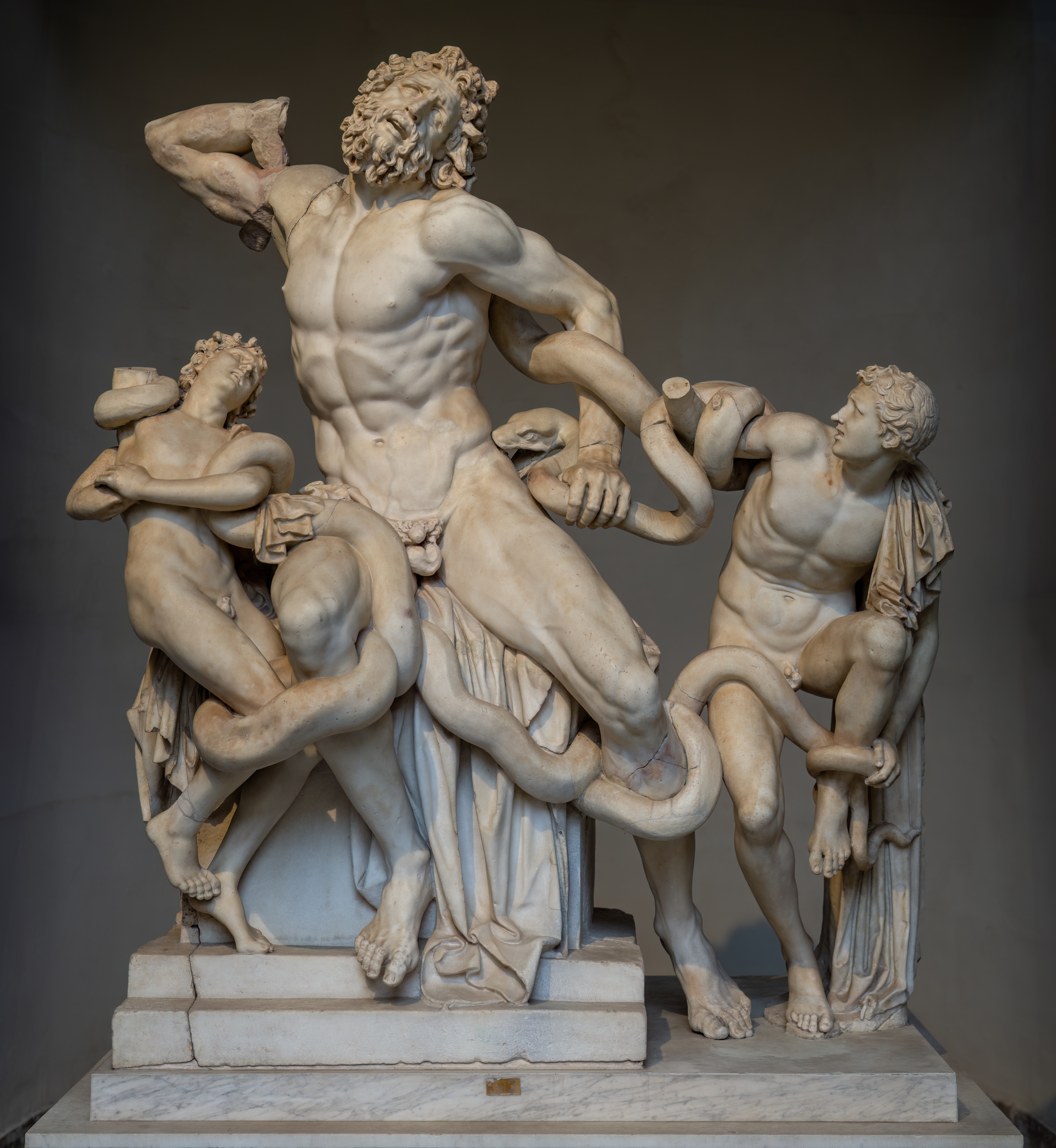
Laocoön and His Sons, Vatican Museums, Rome.

Discovered in Rome in 1506 and seen immediately by Michelangelo, beginning its huge influence on Renaissance and Baroque art. Laocoön, strangled by snakes, tries desperately to loosen their grip without affording a glance at his dying sons. The group is one of very few non-architectural ancient sculptures that can be identified with those mentioned by ancient writers. It is attributed by Pliny the Elder to the Rhodian sculptors Agesander, Athenodoros, and Polydorus.

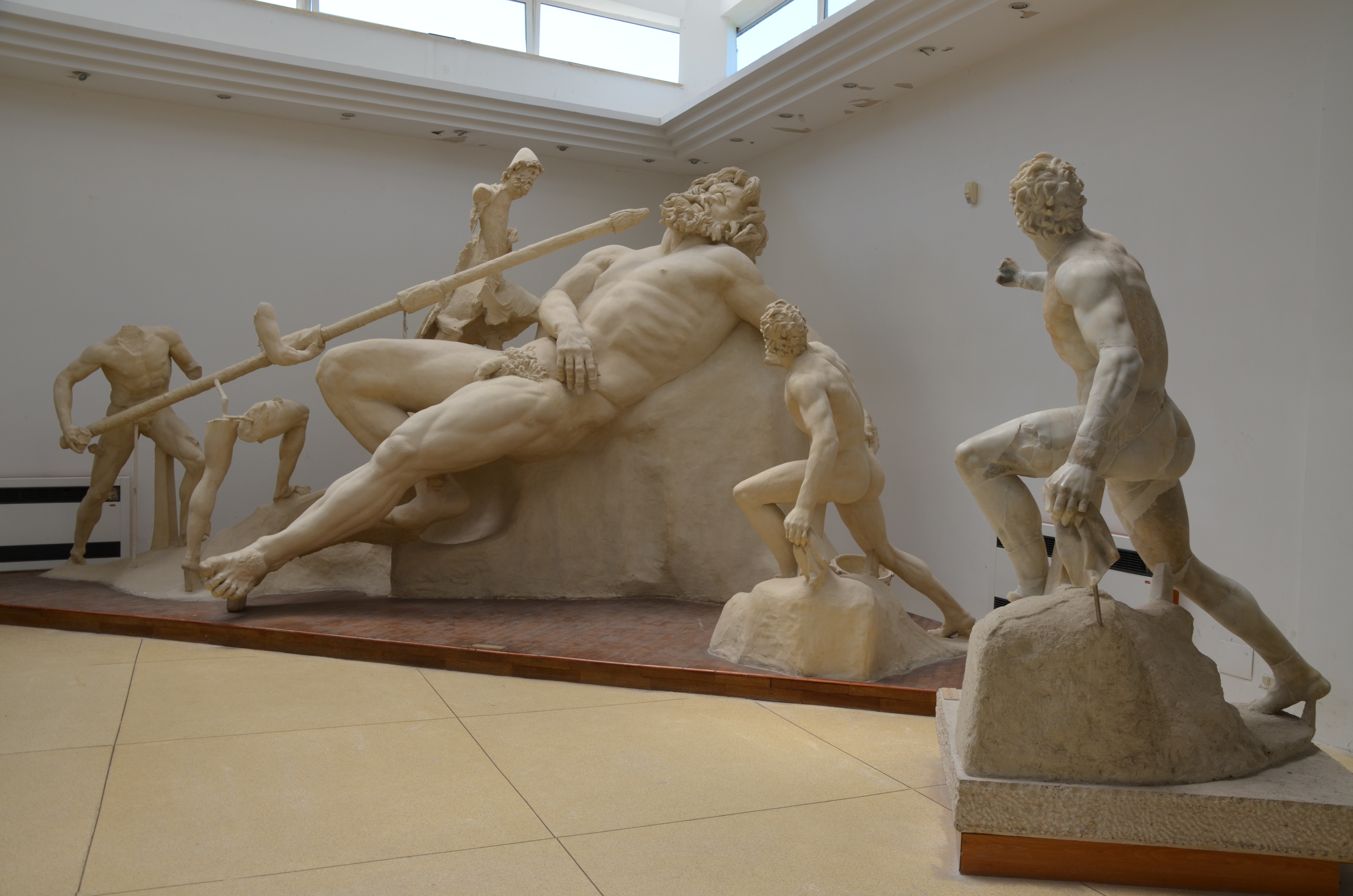
The central group of the Sperlonga sculptures, with the Blinding of Polyphemus; cast reconstruction of the group, with at the right the original figure of the "wineskin-bearer" seen in front of the cast version.

Johann Joachim Winckelmann, who first articulated the difference between Greek, Greco-Roman and Roman art, drew inspiration from the Laocoön. Gotthold Ephraim Lessing based many of the ideas in his 'Laocoon' (1766) on Winckelmann's views on harmony and expression in the visual arts.

==== Sperlonga ====
The fragmentary Sperlonga sculptures are another series of "baroque" sculptures in the Hellenistic style, perhaps made for the Emperor Tiberius, who was certainly present at the collapse of the seaside grotto in southern Italy that they decorated. The inscriptions suggest the same sculptors made it who made the Laocoön group, or possibly their relations.

=== "Rococo" ===
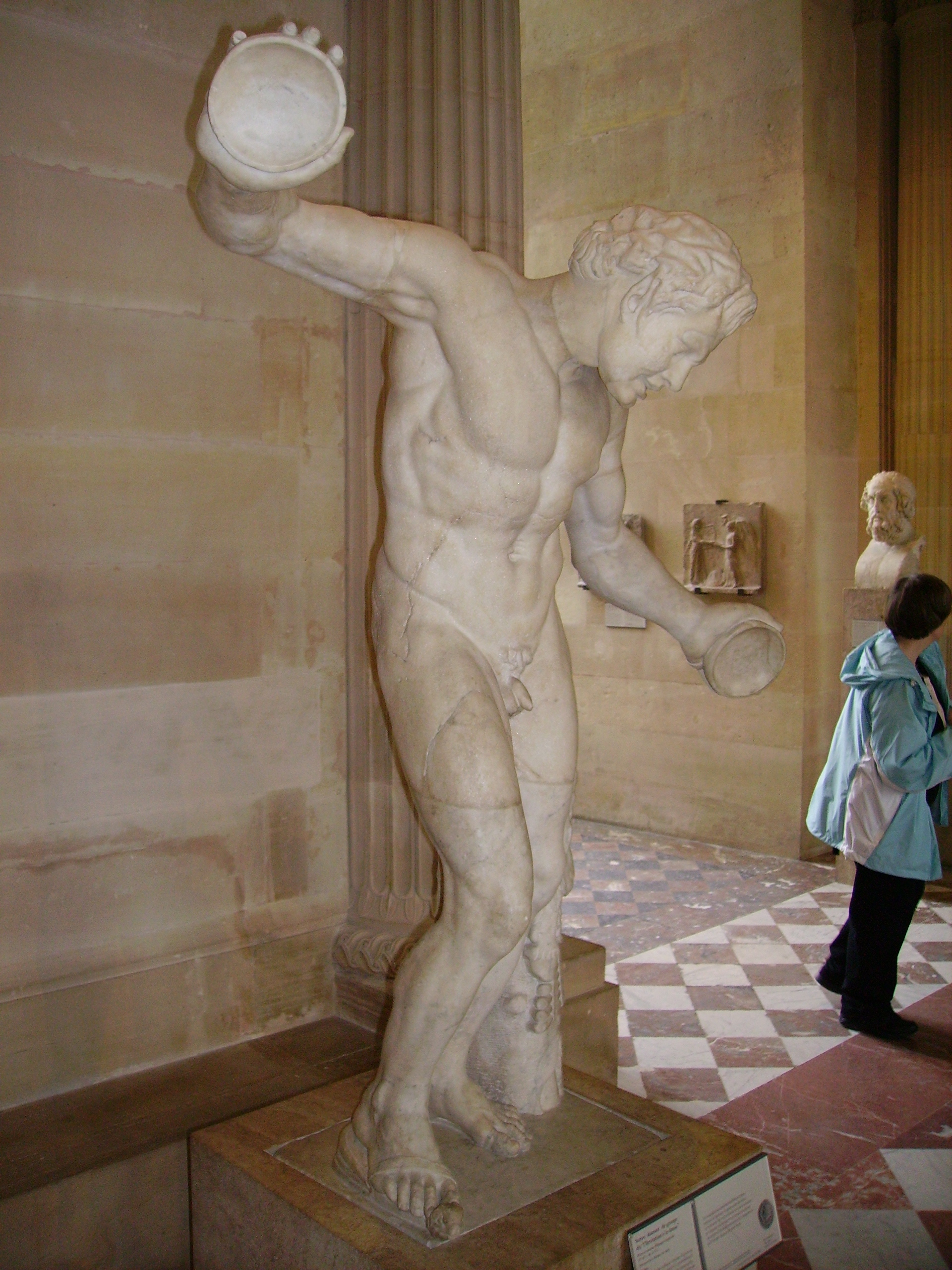
The satyr from the Hellenistic sculpture group "The Invitation to the Dance". The sculpture group is seen as a prime example of the "Rococo" trend in Hellenistic sculpture. In the sculpture group the satyr was depicted together with a seated female. This sculpture is now in the Musée du Louvre, Paris.

The "Baroque" traits in Hellenistic art, predominately sculpture, have been contrasted with a contemporary trend that has been described as "Rococo". The concept of a Hellenistic "Rococo" was coined by Wilhelm Klein in the early 20th century. Unlike the dramatic "Baroque" sculptures, the "Rococo" trend emphasized playfull motifs, such as satyrs and nymphs. Wilhelm Klein considered the sculpture group "The Invitation to the Dance" to be a prime example of the trend. Also lighthearted depictions of Aphrodite, the goddess of love, and Eros, were seen as typical (as seen, for instance, in the so-called Slipper Slapper Group depicted below). It has later been argued that the preference for the "Rococo" motifs in Hellenistic sculpture can be tied to a changed use of sculpture in general. Private sculpture collecting became more common during the later Hellenistic period, and in such collections there seems to have been a preference for the kinds of motifs characterized as "Rococo".

=== Neo-Attic ===
From the 2nd century the Neo-Attic or Neo-Classical style is seen by different scholars as either a reaction to baroque excesses, returning to a version of Classical style, or as a continuation of the traditional style for cult statues. Workshops in the style became mainly producers of copies for the Roman market, which preferred copies of Classical rather than Hellenistic pieces.

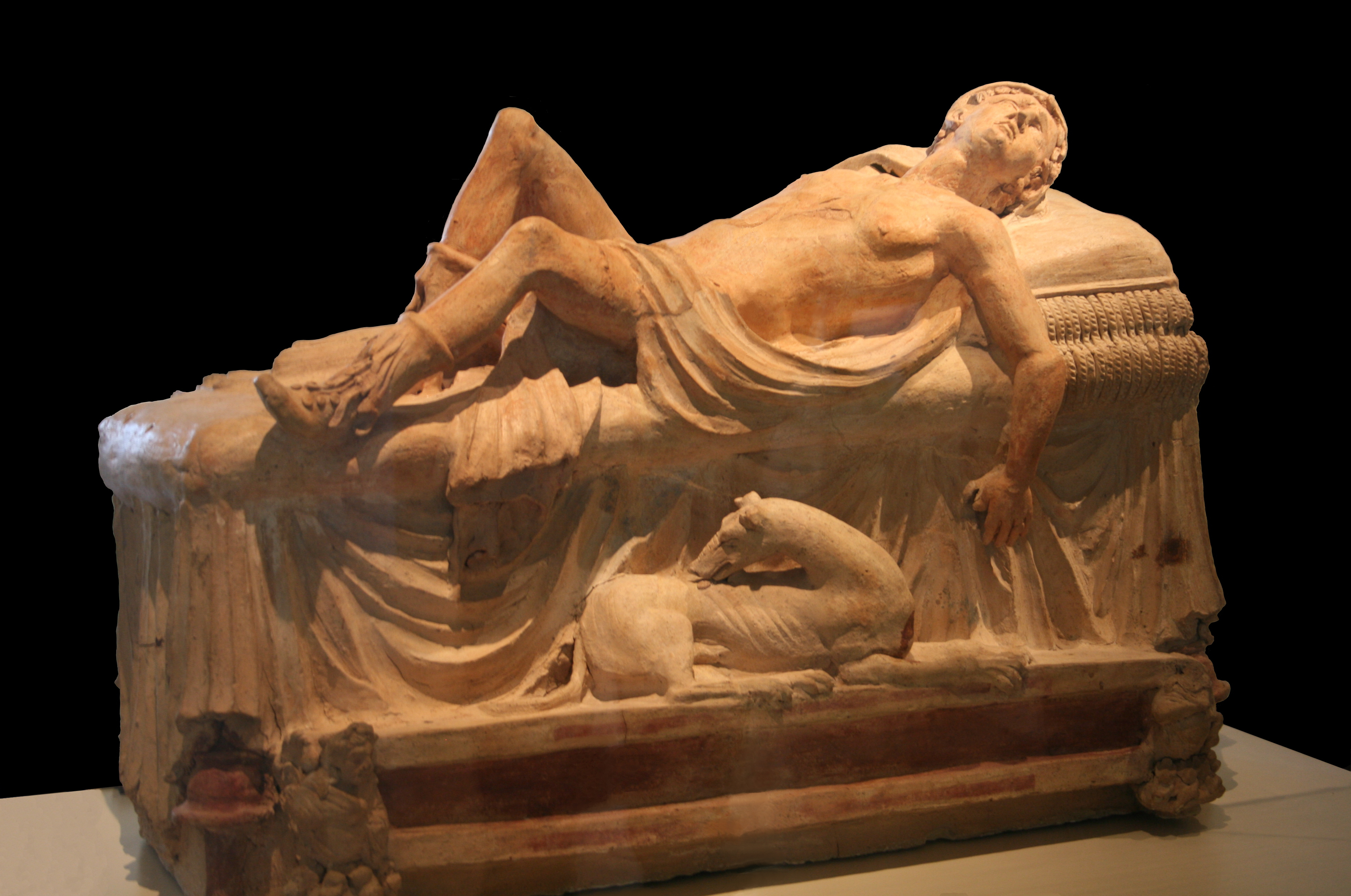
Sepulchral monument of a dying Adonis, polychrome terracotta, Etruscan art from Tuscana, 250-100 BC

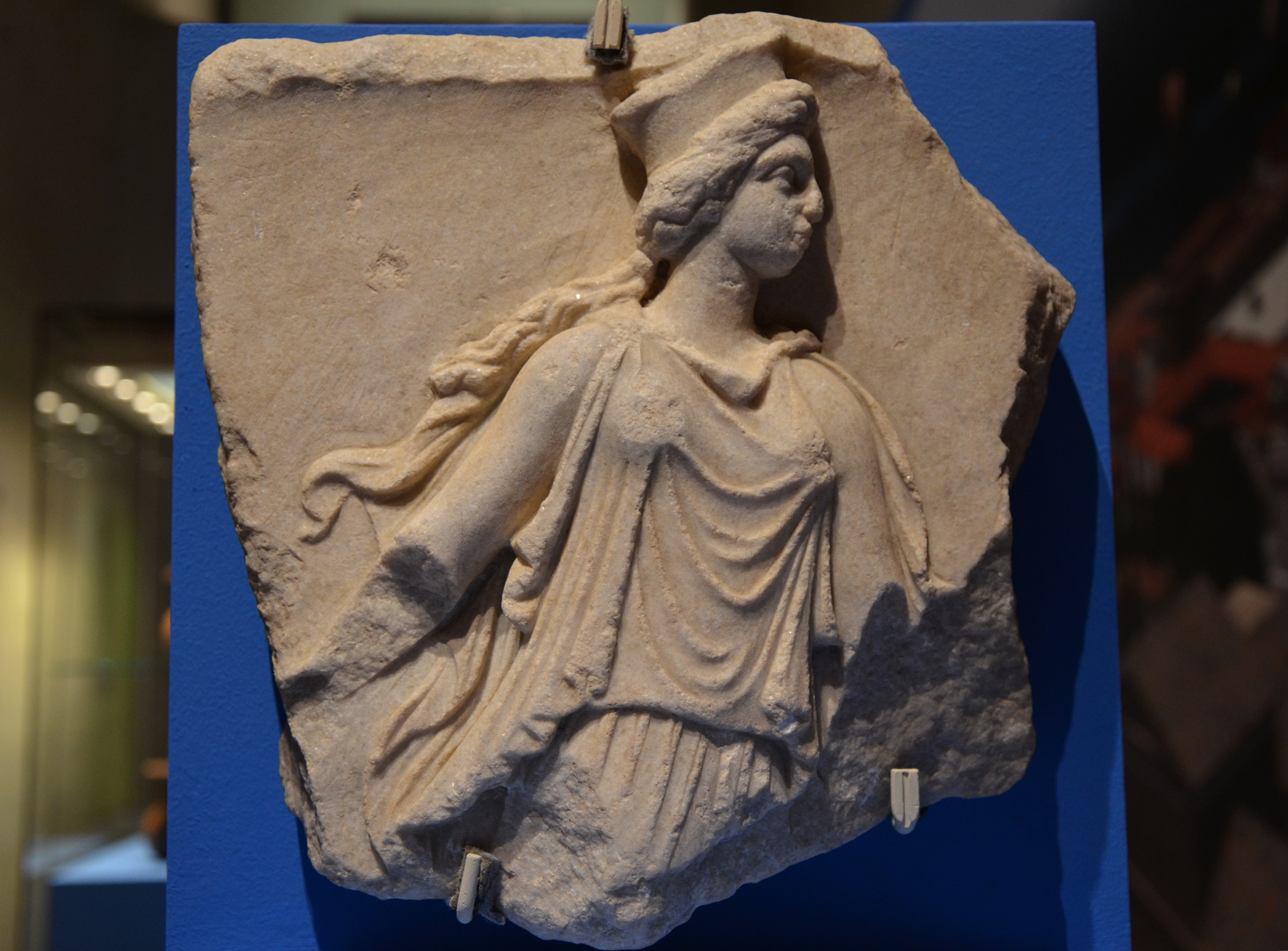
Fragment of a marble relief depicting a Kore, 3rd century BC, from Panticapaeum, Taurica (Crimea), Bosporan Kingdom

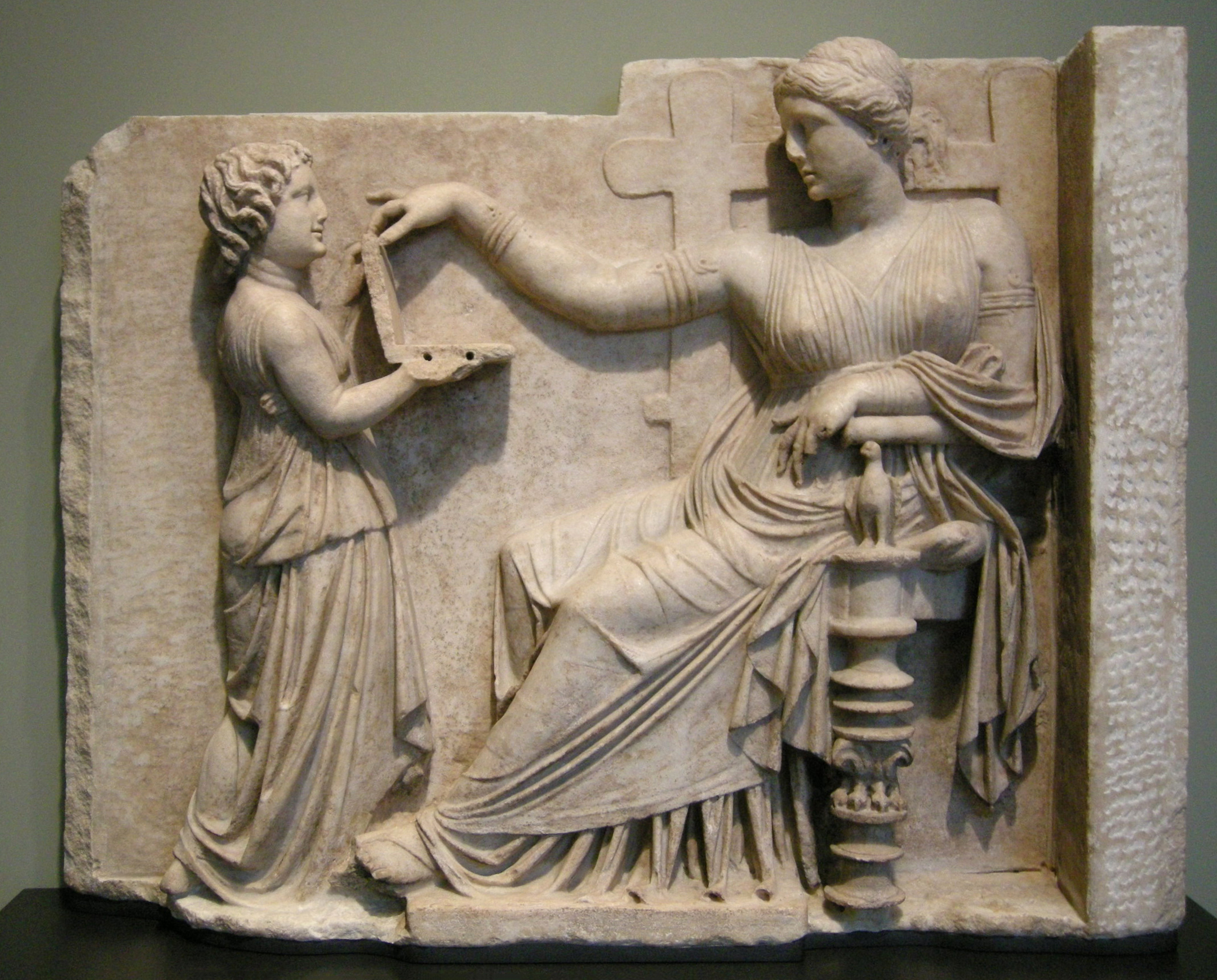
Gravestone of a woman with her child slave attending to her, c. 100 BC (early period of Roman Greece)

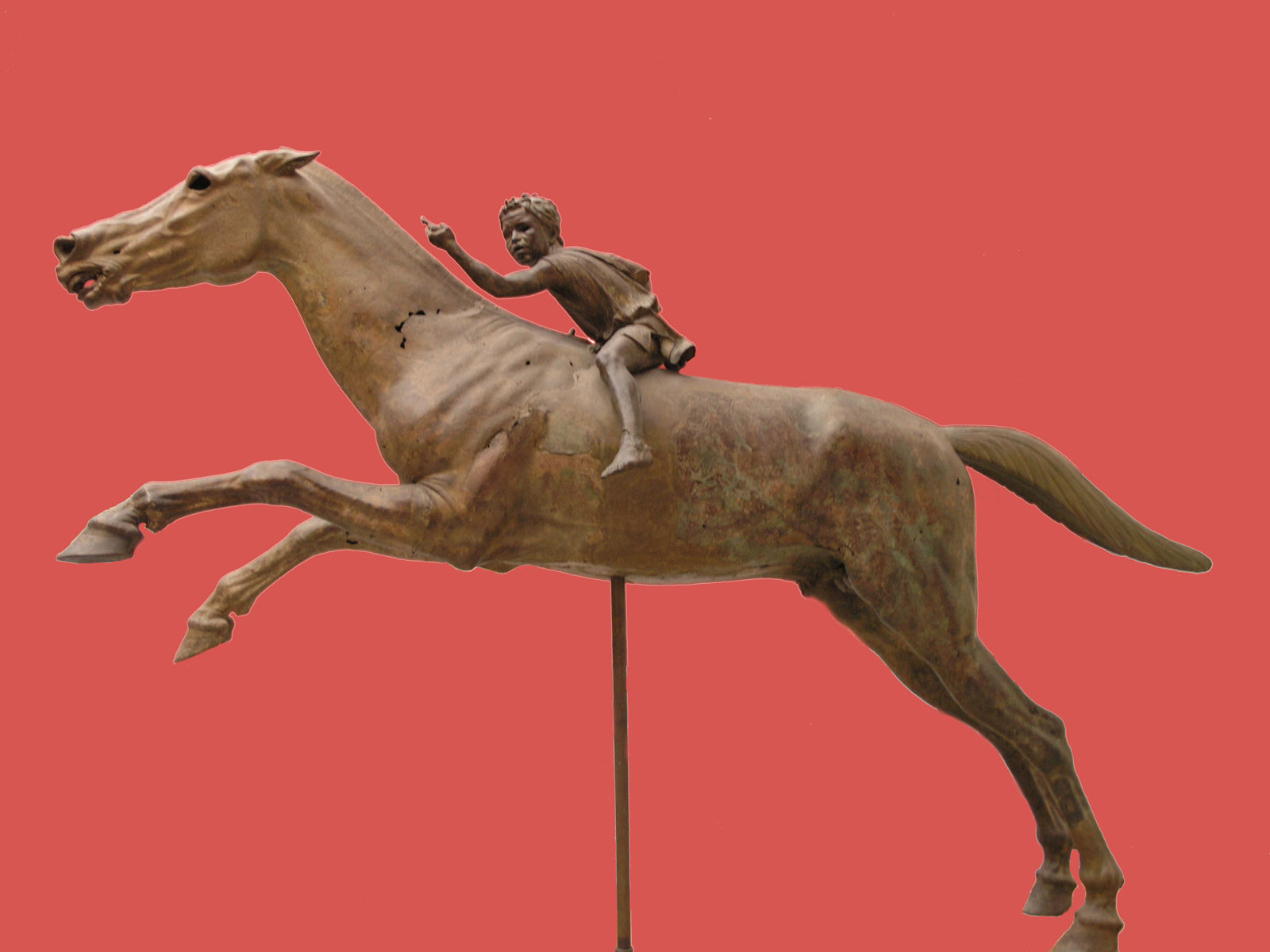
Late Hellenistic bronze of a mounted jockey, National Archaeological Museum, Athens

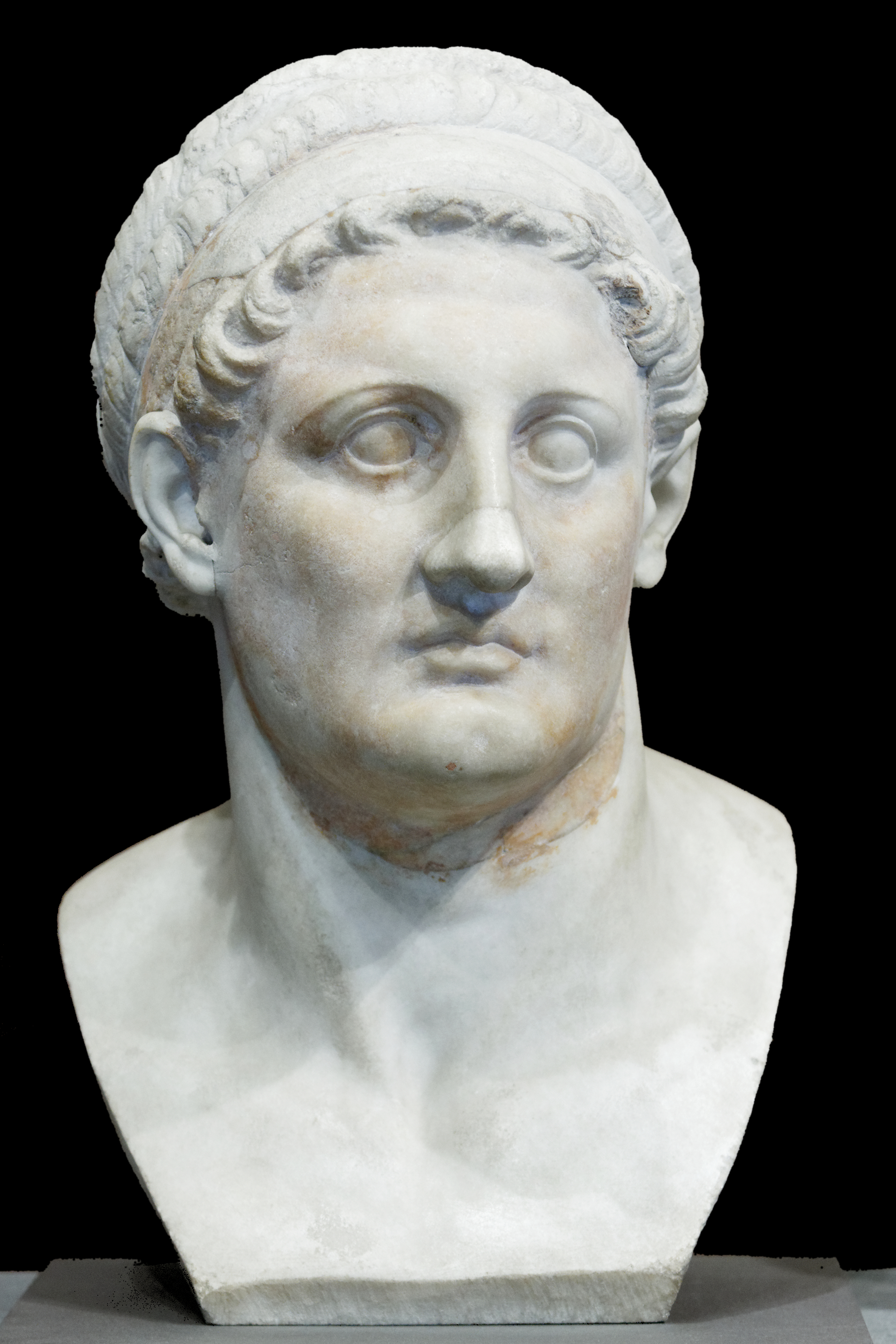
Bust of Ptolemy I Soter wearing a diadem, a symbol of Hellenistic kingship, Louvre Museum.

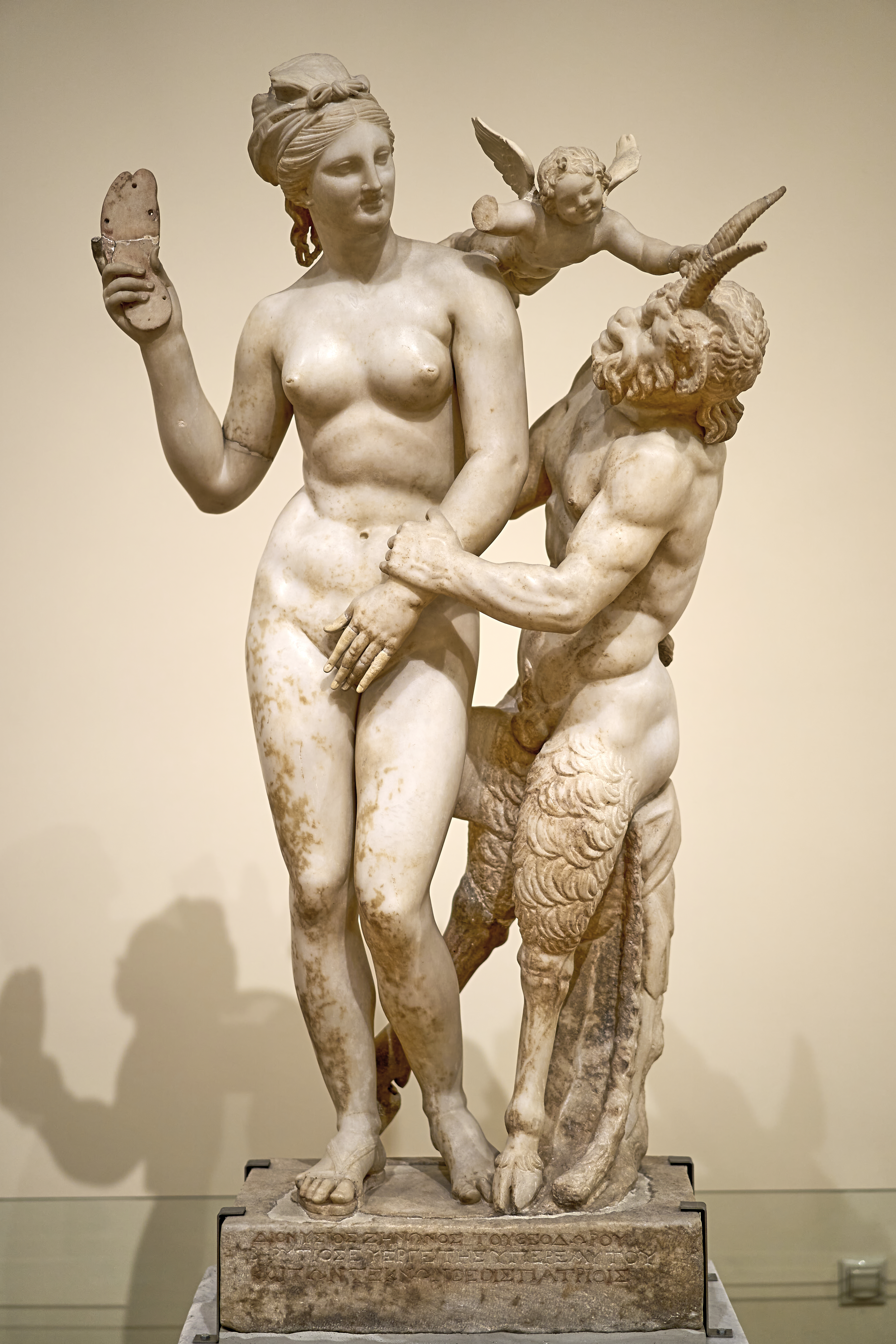
The so-called Slipper Slapper Group: Aphrodite and Eros fighting off the advances of Pan. Marble, Hellenistic artwork from the late 2nd century BC.

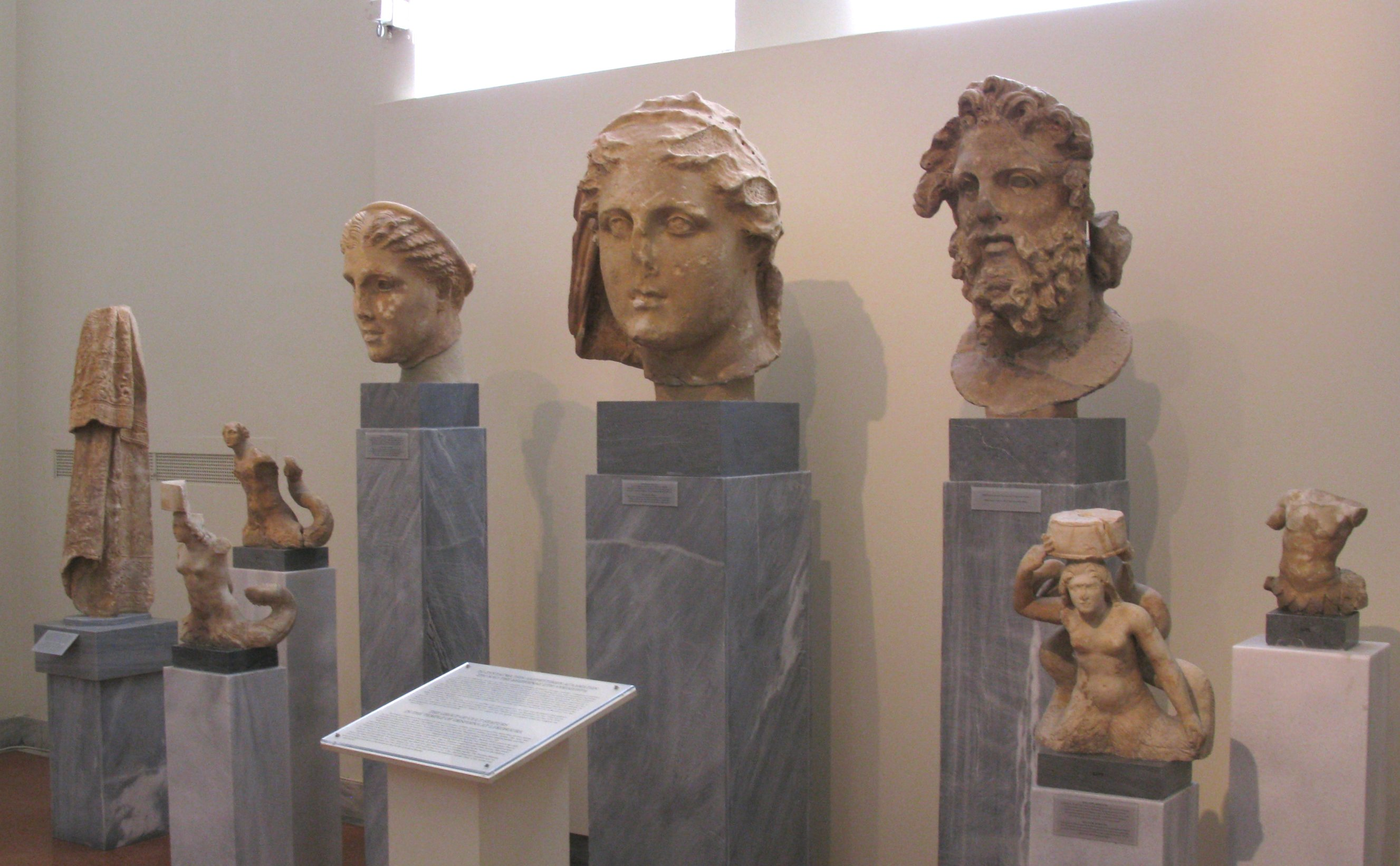
Hellenistic sculpture fragments from the National Archaeological Museum, Athens

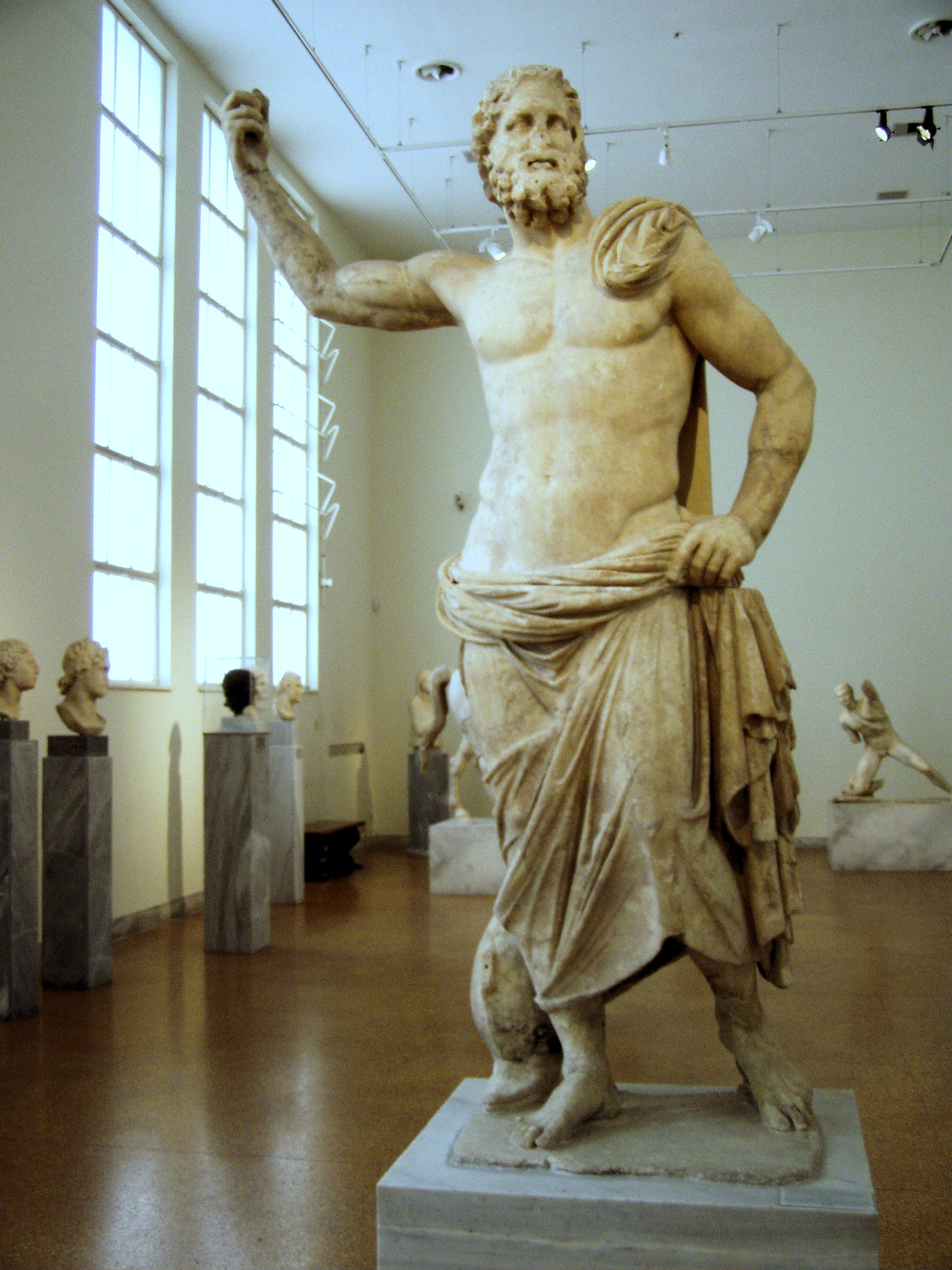
The Poseidon of Melos, from the National Archaeological Museum, Athens.

== Paintings and mosaics ==
Paintings and mosaics were important mediums in art, but no examples of paintings on panels have survived the fall to the Romans. It is possible to get some idea of what they were like from related media, and what seem to be copies of or loose derivations from paintings in a wider range of materials.

=== Landscape ===
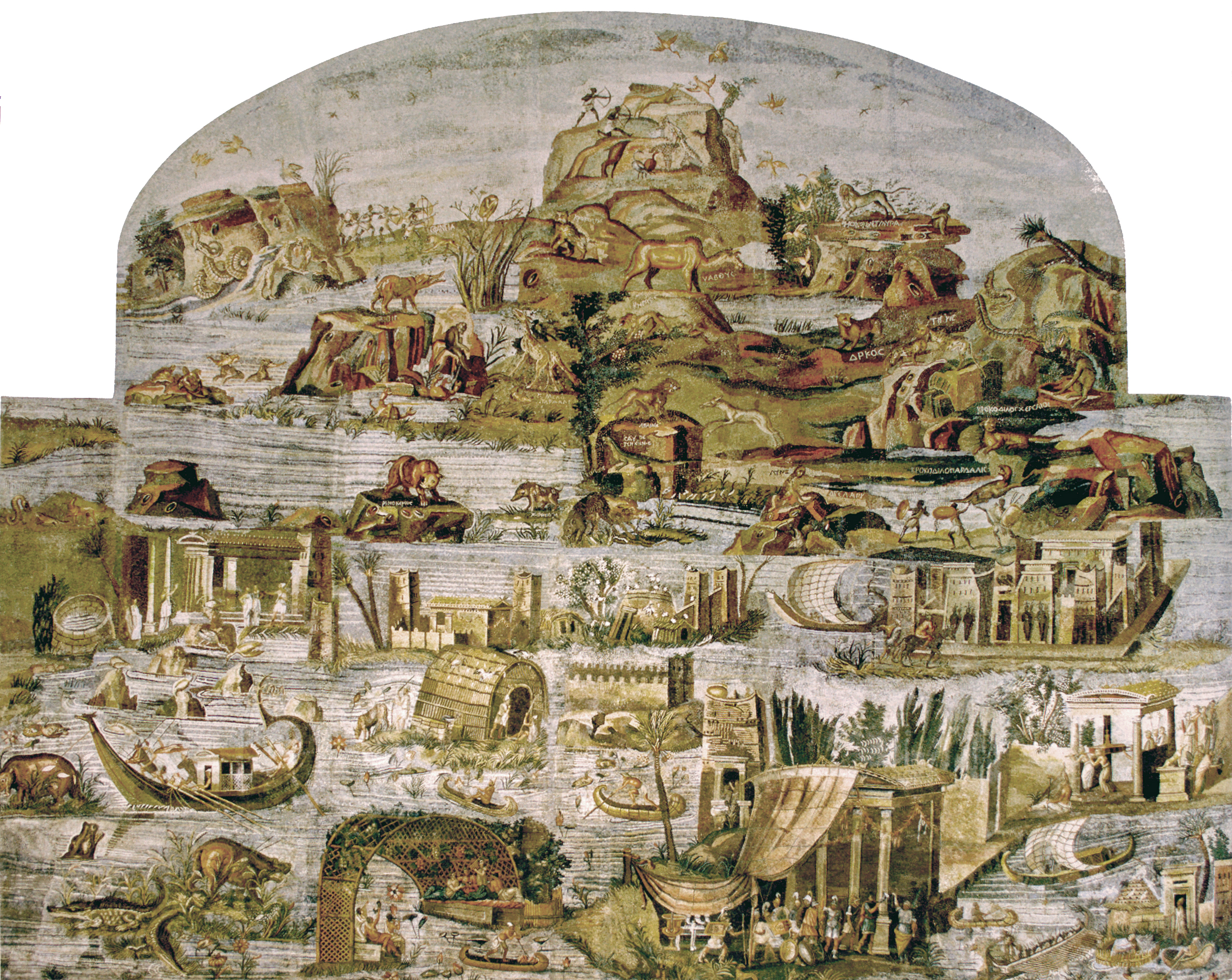
The Nile Mosaic of Palestrina, a Roman and Hellenistic floor mosaic depicting Ptolemaic Egypt, c. 100 BC

Perhaps the most striking element of Hellenistic paintings and mosaics is the increased use of landscape. Landscapes in these works of art are representative of familiar naturalistic figures while also displaying mythological and sacro-idyllic elements. Landscape friezes and mosaics were commonly used to display scenes from Hellenistic poetry such as that by Herondas and Theocritos. These landscapes that expressed the stories of Hellenistic writers were utilized in the home to emphasize that family's education and knowledge about the literary world.

Sacro-idyllic means that the most prominent elements of the artwork are those related to sacred and pastoral themes. This style that emerged most prevalently in Hellenistic art combines sacred and profane elements, creating a dreamlike setting. Sacro-idyllic influences are conveyed in the Roman mosaic "Nile Mosaic of Palestrina" which demonstrates fantastical narratives with a color scheme and commonplace components that illustrate the Nile in its passage from Ethiopia to the Mediterranean. The inclusion of Hellenistic backgrounds can also be seen in works throughout Pompeii, Cyrene, Alexandria. Moreover, specifically in Southern Russia, floral features and branches can be found on walls and ceilings strewn in a disordered yet conventional manner, mirroring a late Greek style. In addition, "Cubiculum" paintings found in Villa Boscoreale include vegetation and a rocky setting in the background of detailed paintings of grand architecture.

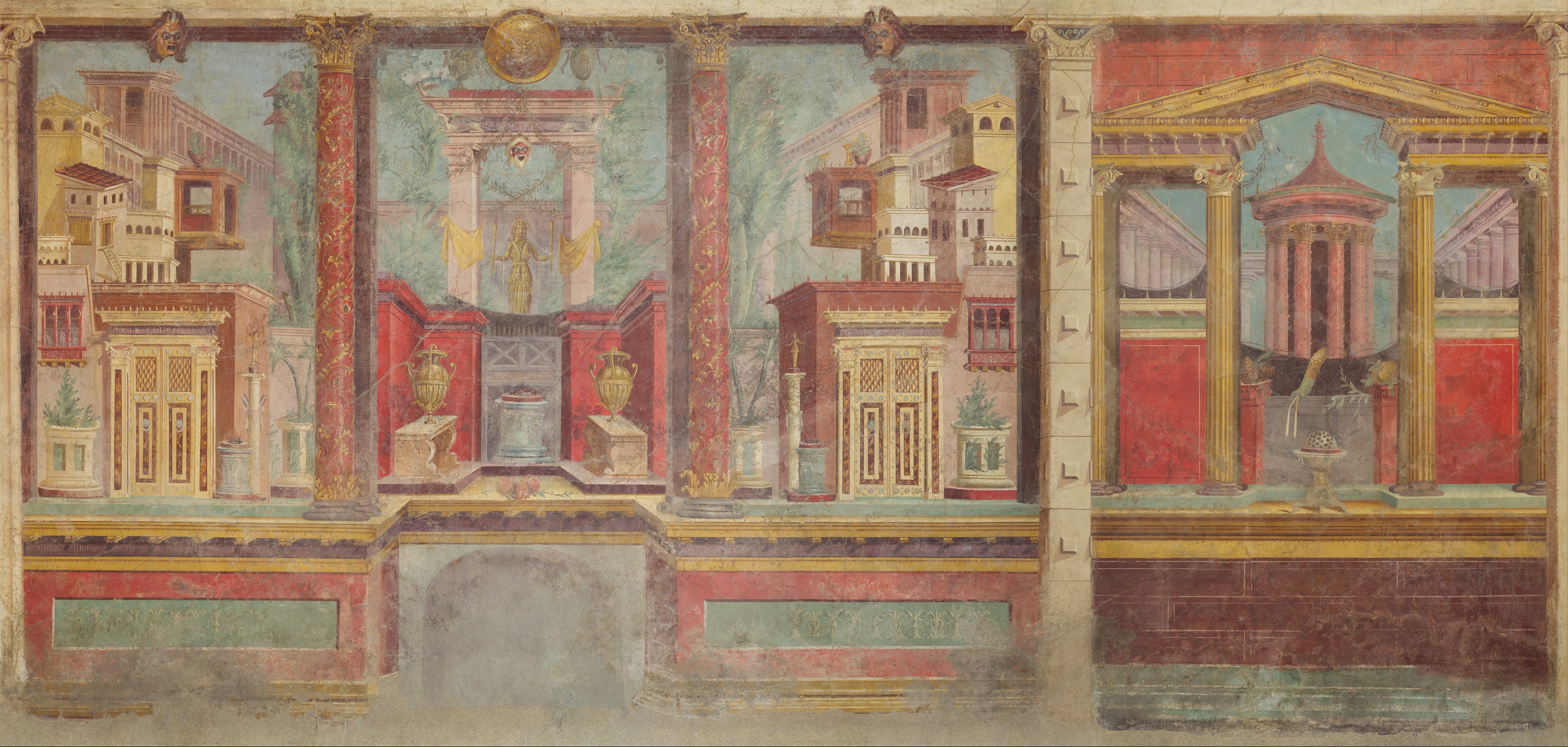
Roman fresco painting known as "Cubiculum" (bedroom) from the Villa of P. Fannius Synistor at Boscoreale, 50–40 B.C. Metropolitan Museum of Art 03.14.13a–g.

=== Wall paintings ===
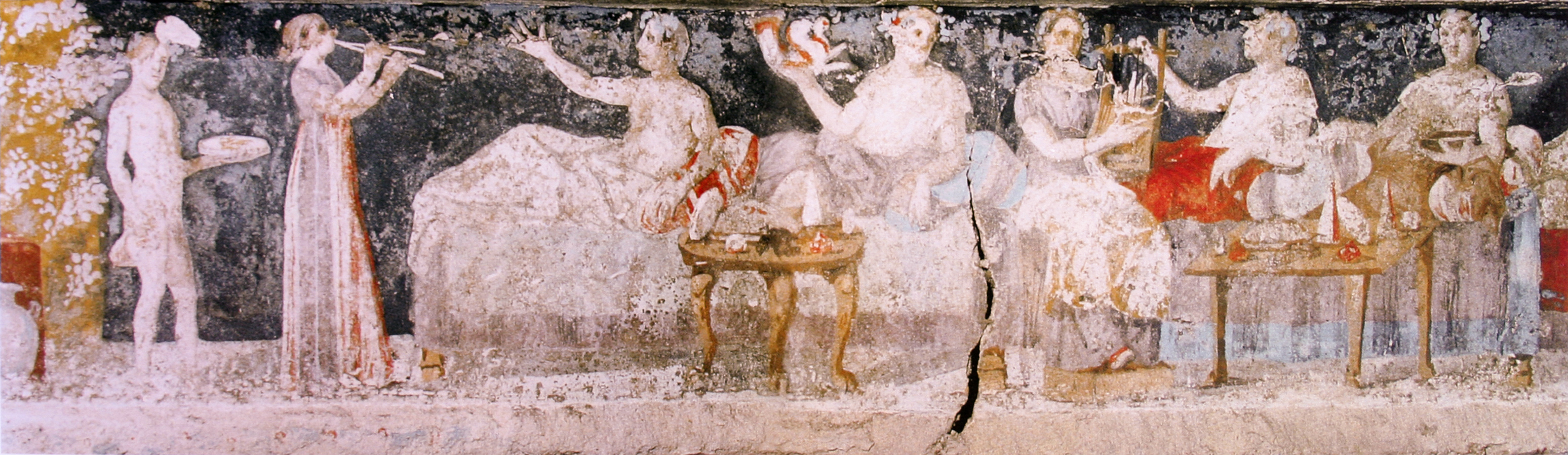
Banquet scene from the tomb of Agios Athanasios, Thessaloniki, 4th century BC.

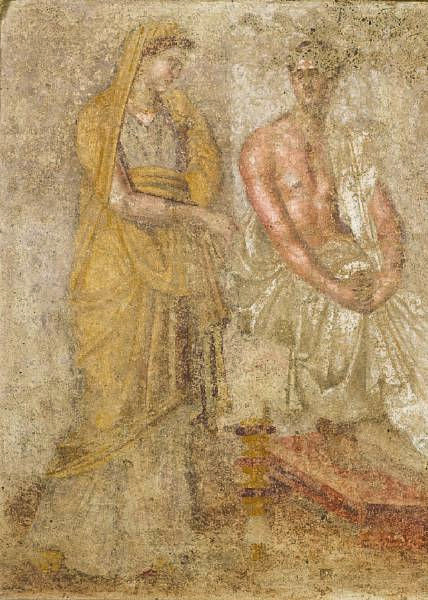
Hellenistic terracotta funerary wall painting, 3rd century BC

Wall paintings began appearing more prominently in the Pompeian period. These wall paintings were not just displayed in places of worship or in tombs. Often, wall paintings were used to decorate the home. Wall paintings were common in private homes in Delos, Priene, Thera, Pantikapaion, Olbia, and Alexandria.

Few examples of Greek wall paintings have survived the centuries. The most impressive, in terms of showing what high-quality Greek painting was like, are those at the Macedonian royal tombs at Vergina. Though Greek painters are given tribute to bringing fundamental ways of representation to the Western World through their art. Three main qualities unique to Hellenistic painting style were three-dimensional perspective, the use of light and shade to render form, and trompe-l'œil realism. Very few forms of Hellenistic Greek painting survive except for wooden pinakes panels and those painted on stone. The most famously known stone paintings are found on the Macedonian Tomb at Agios Athanasios.

Researchers have been limited to studying the Hellenistic influences in Roman frescoes, for example those of Pompeii or Herculaneum. In addition, some of the paintings in Villa Boscoreale clearly echo lost Hellenistic, Macedonian royal paintings.

==== Mediums and technique ====
Recent excavations from the Mediterranean have revealed the technology used in Hellenistic painting. Wall art of this period utilized two techniques: secco technique and fresco technique. Fresco technique required layers of lime-rich plaster to then decorate walls and stone supports. On the other hand, no base was necessary for the secco technique, which used gum arabic and egg tempera to paint finalizing details on marble or other stone. This technique is exemplified in the Masonry friezes found in Delos. Both techniques used mediums that were locally accessible, such as terracotta aggregates in the base layers and natural inorganic pigments, synthetic inorganic pigments, and organic substances as colorants.

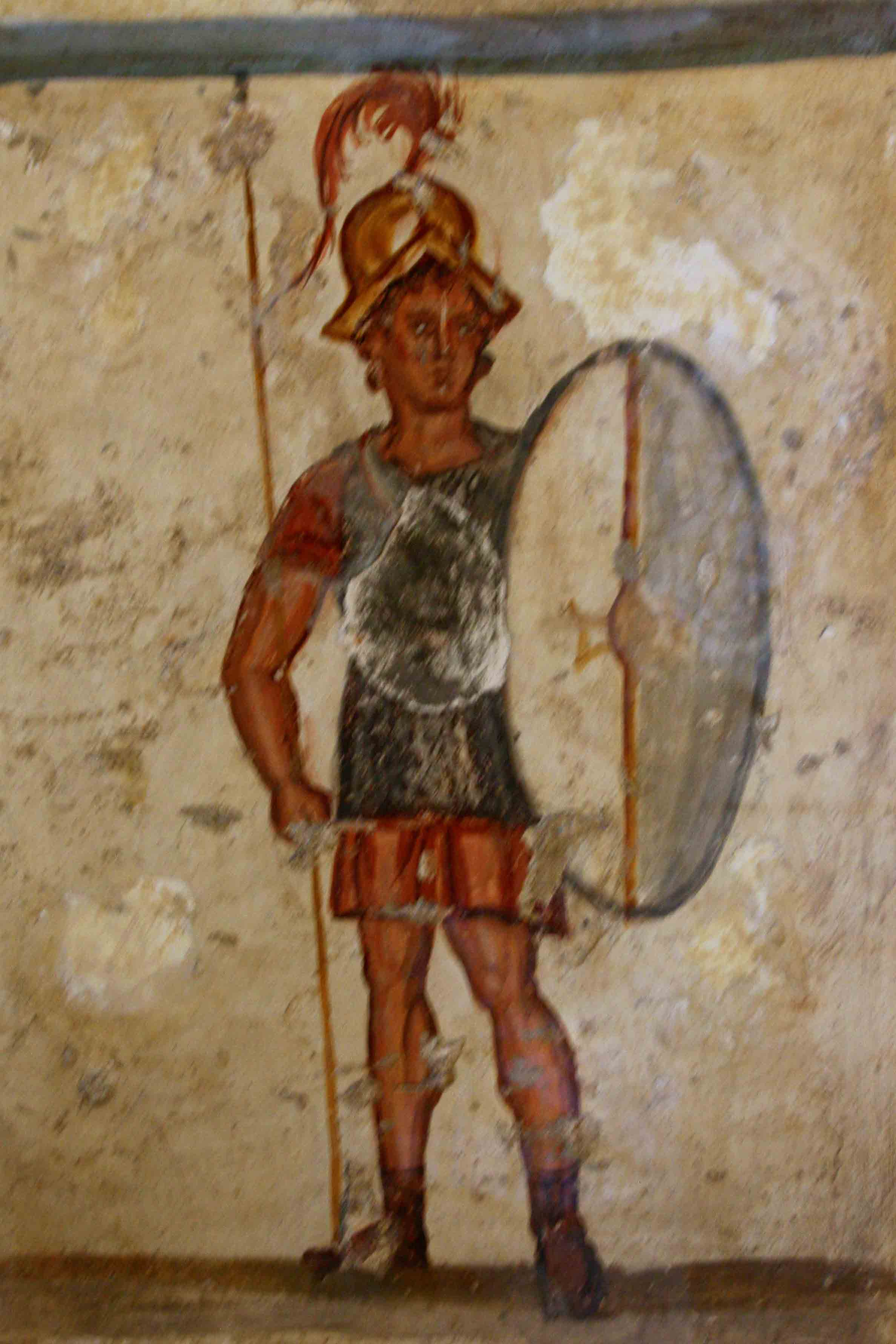
Fresco of an ancient Macedonian soldier (thorakitai) wearing chainmail armor and bearing a thureos shield.

==== Recent discoveries ====
Recent discoveries include those of chamber tombs in Vergina (1987) in the former kingdom of Macedonia, where many friezes have been unearthed. For example, in Tomb II archaeologists found a Hellenistic-style frieze depicting a lion hunt. This frieze found in the tomb supposedly that of Philip II is remarkable by its composition, the arrangement of the figures in space and its realistic representation of nature. Other friezes maintain a realistic narrative, such as a symposium and banquet or a military escort, and possibly retell historical events.

There is also the recently restored 1st-century Nabataean ceiling frescoes in the Painted House at Little Petra in Jordan. As the Nabataeans traded with the Romans, Egyptians, and Greeks, insects and other animals observed in the paintings reflect Hellenism while various types of vines are associated with the Greek god, Dionysus.

Recent archaeological discoveries at the cemetery of Pagasae (close to modern Volos), at the edge of the Pagasetic Gulf have brought to light some original works. The excavations of this site led by Dr. Arvanitopoulos may be connected to various Greek painters in the 3rd and 4th centuries and depict scenes that allude to the reign of Alexander the Great.

In the 1960s, a group of wall paintings was found on Delos. It is evident that the fragments of friezes found were created by a community of painters who lived during the late Hellenistic period. The murals emphasized domestic decoration, conveying the belief these people held that the Delian establishment would remain stable and secure enough for this artwork to be enjoyed by homeowners for many years to come.

=== Mosaics ===
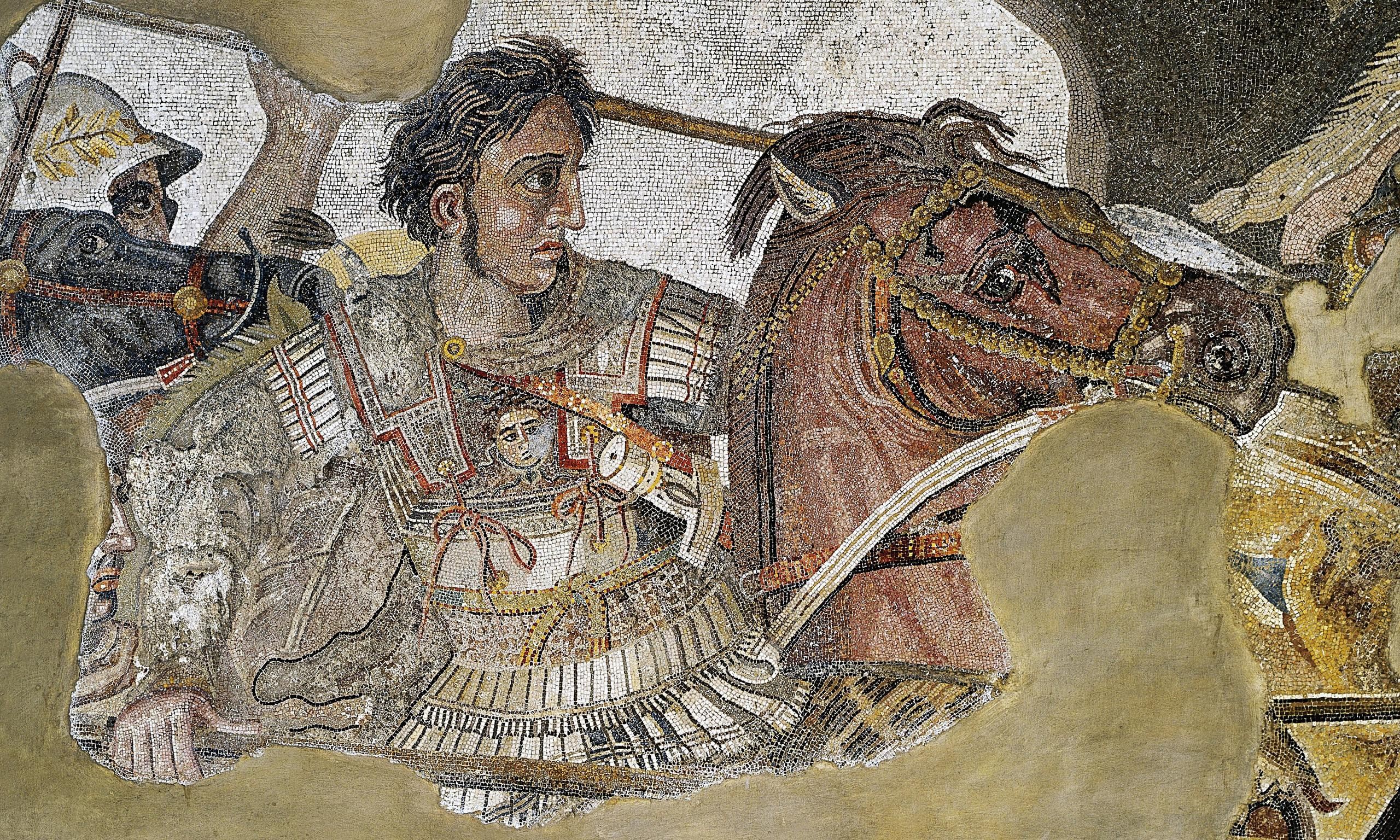
Detail of the Alexander Mosaic, showing Alexander the Great, Roman copy c. 100 BC from the House of the Faun in Pompeii, from an original Hellenistic painting of the 3rd century BC, possibly by Philoxenus of Eretria.

Certain mosaics, however, provide a pretty good idea of the "grand painting" of the period: these are copies of frescoes. This art form has been used to decorate primarily walls, floors, and columns.

==== Mediums and technique ====
The development of mosaic art during the Hellenistic Period began with Pebble Mosaics, best represented in the site of Olynthos from 5th century BC. The technique of Pebble Mosaics consisted of placing small white and black pebbles of no specific shape, in a circular or rectangular panel to illustrate scenes of mythology. The white pebbles -in slightly different shades- were placed on a black or blue background to create the image. The black pebbles served to outline the image.

In the mosaics from the site of Pella, from the 4th century BC, it is possible to see a more evolved form of the art. Mosaics from this site display the use of pebbles that were shaded in a wider range of colors and tones. They also show early use of terra-cotta and lead wire to create a greater definition of contours and details to the images in the mosaics.

Following this example, more materials were gradually added. Examples of this extended use of materials in mosaics of the 3rd century BC include finely cut stones, chipped pebbles, glass and baked clay, known as tesserae. This improved the technique of mosaics by aiding the artists in creating more definition, greater detail, a better fit, and an even wider range of colors and tones.

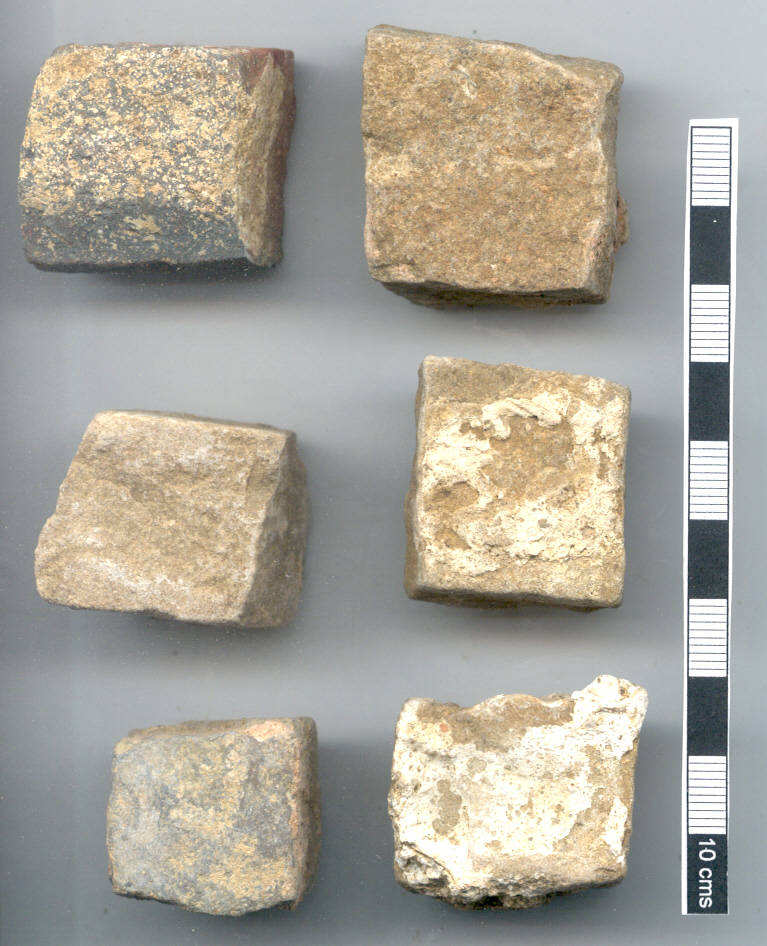
Example of tesserae used in mosaics.

Despite the chronological order of the appearance of these techniques, there is no actual evidence to suggest that the tessellated necessarily developed from the pebble mosaics.

Opus vermiculatum and opus tessellatum were two different techniques used during this period of mosaic making. Opus tessellatum refers to a redacted tessera (a small block of stone, tile, glass, or other material used in the construction of a mosaic) size followed by an increased variety in shape, color, and material as well as andamento––or the pattern in which the tessera was laid. Opus vermiculatum is oftentimes partnered with this technique but differs in complexity and is known to have the highest visual impact.

The majority of mosaics were produced and laid on site. However, a number of floor mosaics display the use of the emblemata technique, in which panels of the image are created off-site in trays of terra-cotta or stone. These trays were later placed into the setting-bed on the site.

At Delos, colored grouts were used on opus vermiculatum mosaics, but in other regions this is not common. There is one example of colored grout used in Alexandria on the Dog and Askos mosaic. At Samos, the grouts and the tesserae are both colored.

Studying color here is difficult as the grouts are extremely fragile and vulnerable.

Scientifics research has been a source of interesting information with regard to the grouts and tesserae used in Hellenistic Mosaics. Lead strips were discovered on mosaics as a definiting characteristic of the surface technique. Lead strips are absent from the mosaics here. At Delos, lead strips were common on mosaics in the opus tessellatum style. These strips were used to outline decorative borders and geometric decorative motifs. The strips were extremely common on opus vermiculatum mosaics from Alexandria. Because lead strips were present in both styles of surface types, they cannot be the sole characteristic of one type or the other.

==== Tel Dor mosaic ====
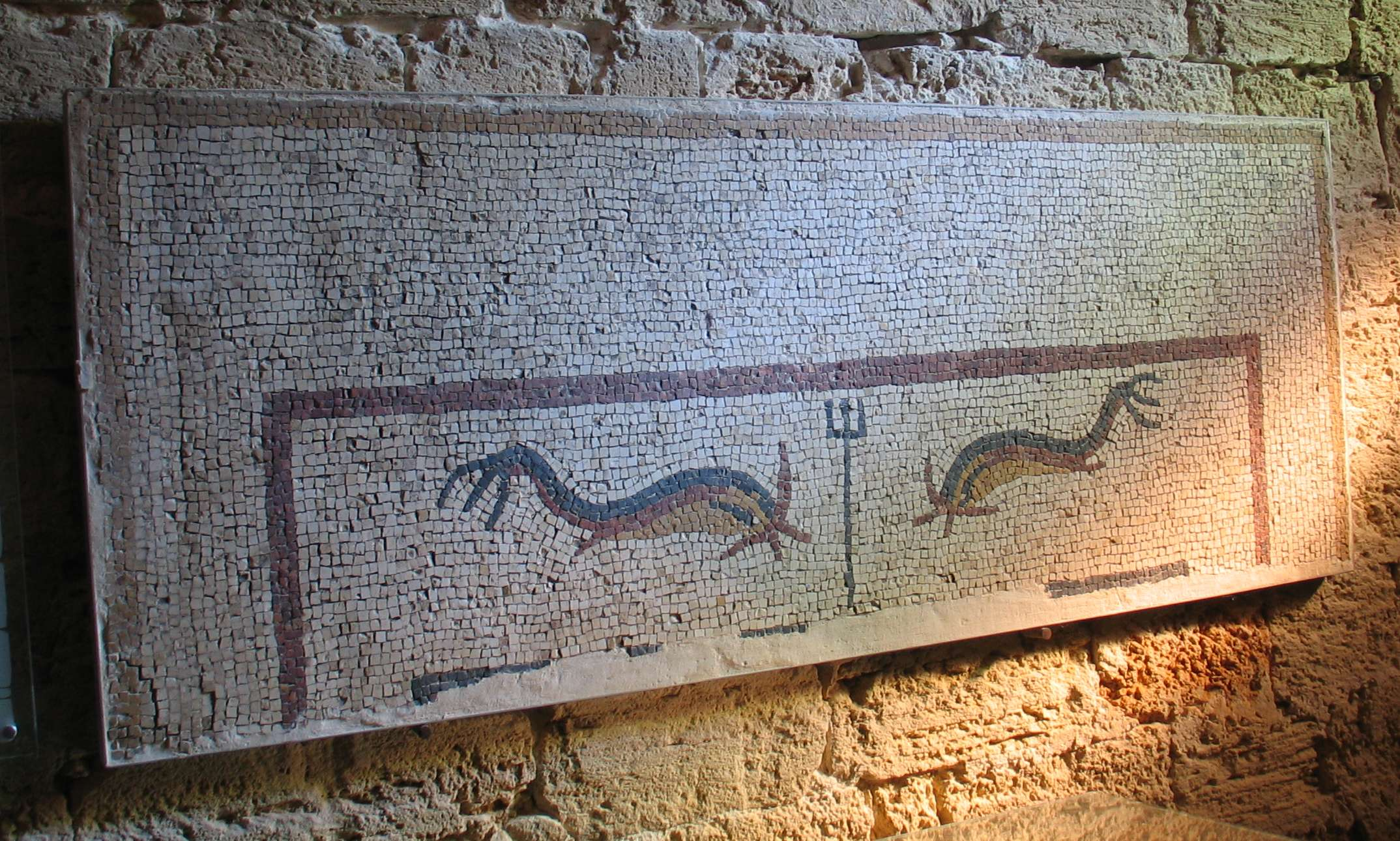
Detail of mosaic from Tel Dor circa 1st-2nd centuries. Found in Ha-Mizgaga Museum in Kibbutz Nahsholim, Israel.

A rare example of virtuoso Hellenistic style picture mosaic found in the Levantine coast. Through a technical analysis of the mosaic, researchers suggest that this mosaic was created by itinerant craftsman working in situ. Since 2000, over 200 fragments of the mosaic have been discovered at the headline of Tel Dor, however, the destruction of the original mosaic is unknown. Excavators suggest that earthquake or urban renewal is the cause. Original architectural context is unknown, but stylistic and technical comparisons suggest a late Hellenistic period date, estimating around the second half of the second century B.C.E. Analyzing the fragments found at the original site, researchers have found that the original mosaic contained a centralized rectangle with unknown iconography surrounded by a series of decorative borders consisting of a perspective meander followed by a mask-and-garland border. This mosaic consists of two different techniques of mosaic making, opus vermiculatum and opus tessellatum.

==== Alexander mosaic ====
An example is the Alexander Mosaic, showing the confrontation of the young conqueror and the Grand King Darius III at the Battle of Issus, a mosaic from a floor in the House of the Faun at Pompeii (now in Naples). It is believed to be a copy of a painting described by Pliny which had been painted by Philoxenus of Eretria for King Cassander of Macedon at the end of the 4th century BC, or even of a painting by Apelles contemporaneous with Alexander himself. The mosaic allows us to admire the choice of colors along with the composition of the ensemble using turning movement and facial expression.

==== Stag Hunt mosaic ====
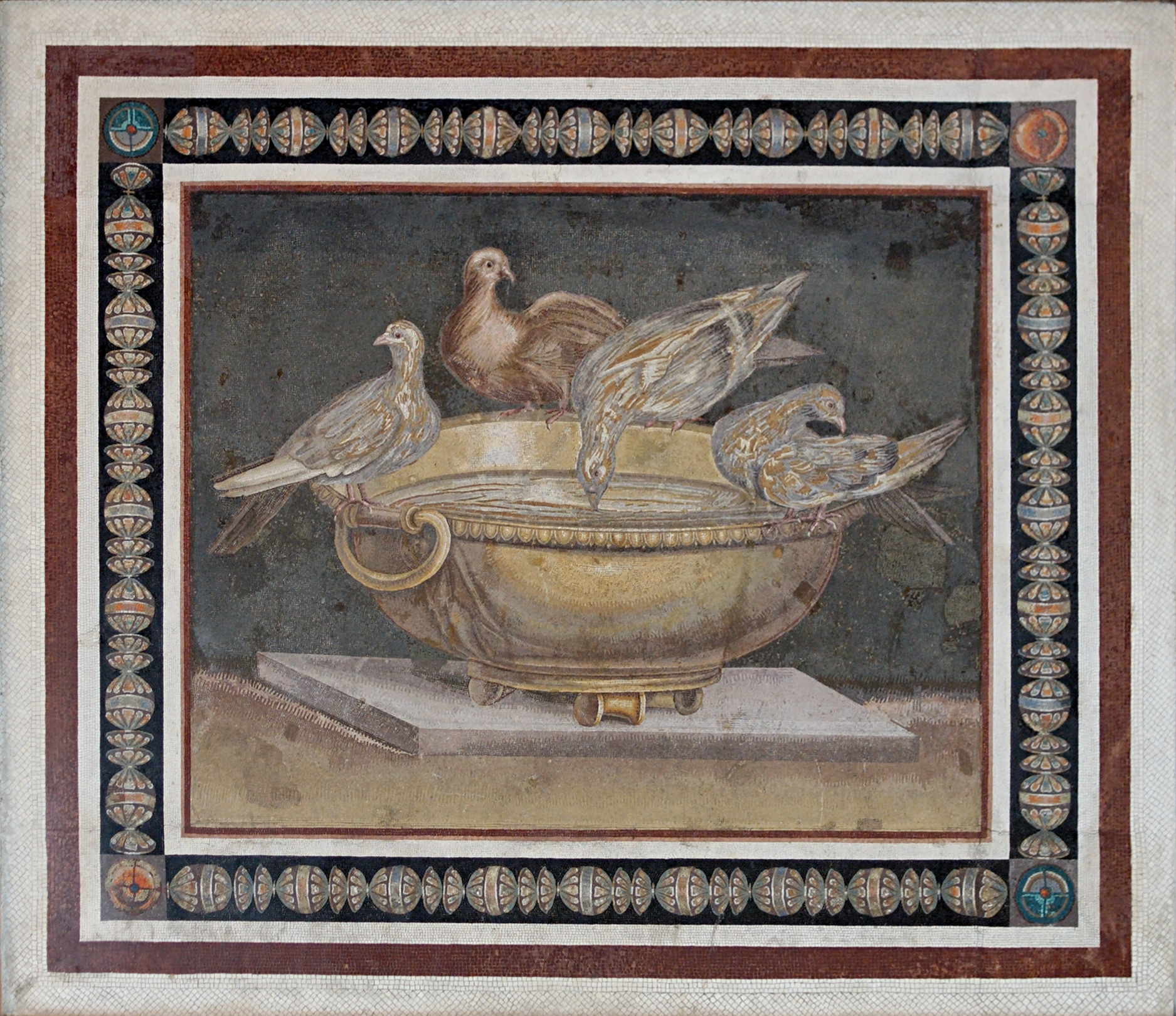
The "Dove Basin" (Capitoline), attributed to Sosos of Pergamon, from Hadrian's Villa, Tivoli, Lazio, 2nd century AD

The Stag Hunt Mosaic by Gnosis is a mosaic from a wealthy home of the late 4th century BC, the so-called "House of the Abduction of Helen" (or "House of the Rape of Helen"), in Pella, The signature ("Gnosis epoesen", i.e. Gnosis created) is the first known signature of a mosaicist.

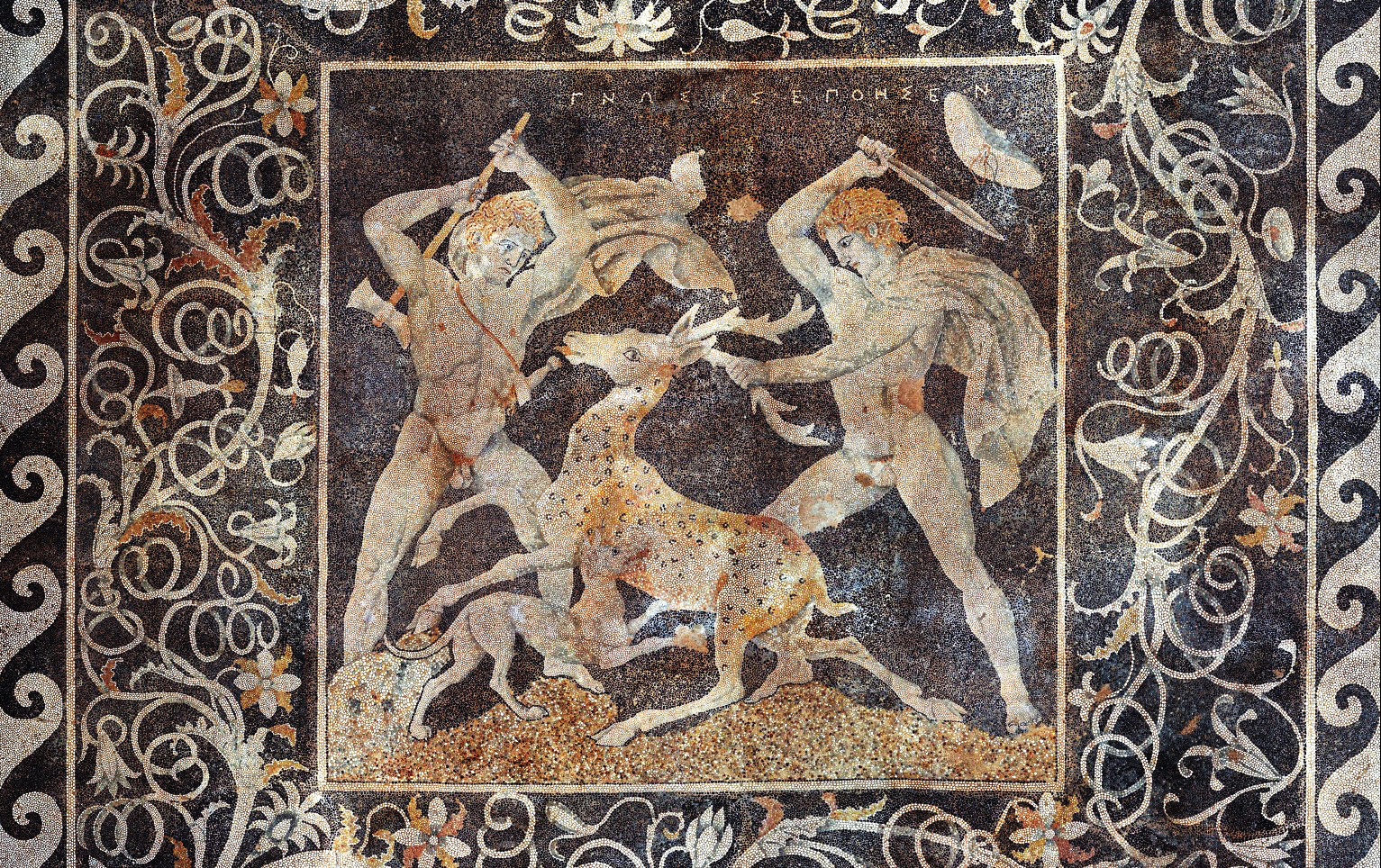
The Stag Hunt Mosaic, late 4th century BC, from Pella; most likely depicting Alexander and Hephaestion

The emblema is bordered by an intricate floral pattern, which itself is bordered by stylized depictions of waves. The mosaic is a pebble mosaic with stones collected from beaches and riverbanks which were set into cement. As was perhaps often the case, the mosaic does much to reflect styles of painting. The light figures against a darker background may allude to red figure painting. The mosaic also uses shading, known to the Greeks as skiagraphia, in its depictions of the musculature and cloaks of the figures. This along with its use of overlapping figures to create depth renders the image three dimensional.

==== Sosos ====
The Hellenistic period is equally the time of development of the mosaic as such, particularly with the works of Sosos of Pergamon, active in the 2nd century BC and the only mosaic artist cited by Pliny. His taste for trompe-l'œil (optical illusion) and the effects of the medium are found in several works attributed to him such as the "Unswept Floor" in the Vatican museum, representing the leftovers of a repast (fish bones, bones, empty shells, etc.) and the "Dove Basin" (made of small opus vermiculatum tesserae stones) at the Capitoline Museum, known by means of a reproduction discovered in Hadrian's Villa. In it one sees four doves perched on the edge of a gilt bronze basin filled with water. One of them is watering herself while the others seem to be resting, which creates effects of reflections and shadow perfectly studied by the artist. The "Dove Basin" mosaic panel is an emblema, designed to be the central point of an otherwise plain mosaic floor. The emblema was originally an import from the Hellenistic eastern Mediterranean, where, in cities such as Pergamom, Ephesus and Alexandria, there were artists specializing in mosaics. One of them was Sosos of Pergamon, the most celebrated mosaicist of antiquity who worked in the second century BC.

==== Delos ====
According to the French archaeologist François Chamoux, the mosaics of Delos in the Cyclades represent the zenith of Hellenistic-period mosaic art employing the use of tesserae to form complex, colorful scenes. This style of mosaic continued until the end of Antiquity and may have had an impact on the widespread use of mosaics in the Western world during the Middle Ages.

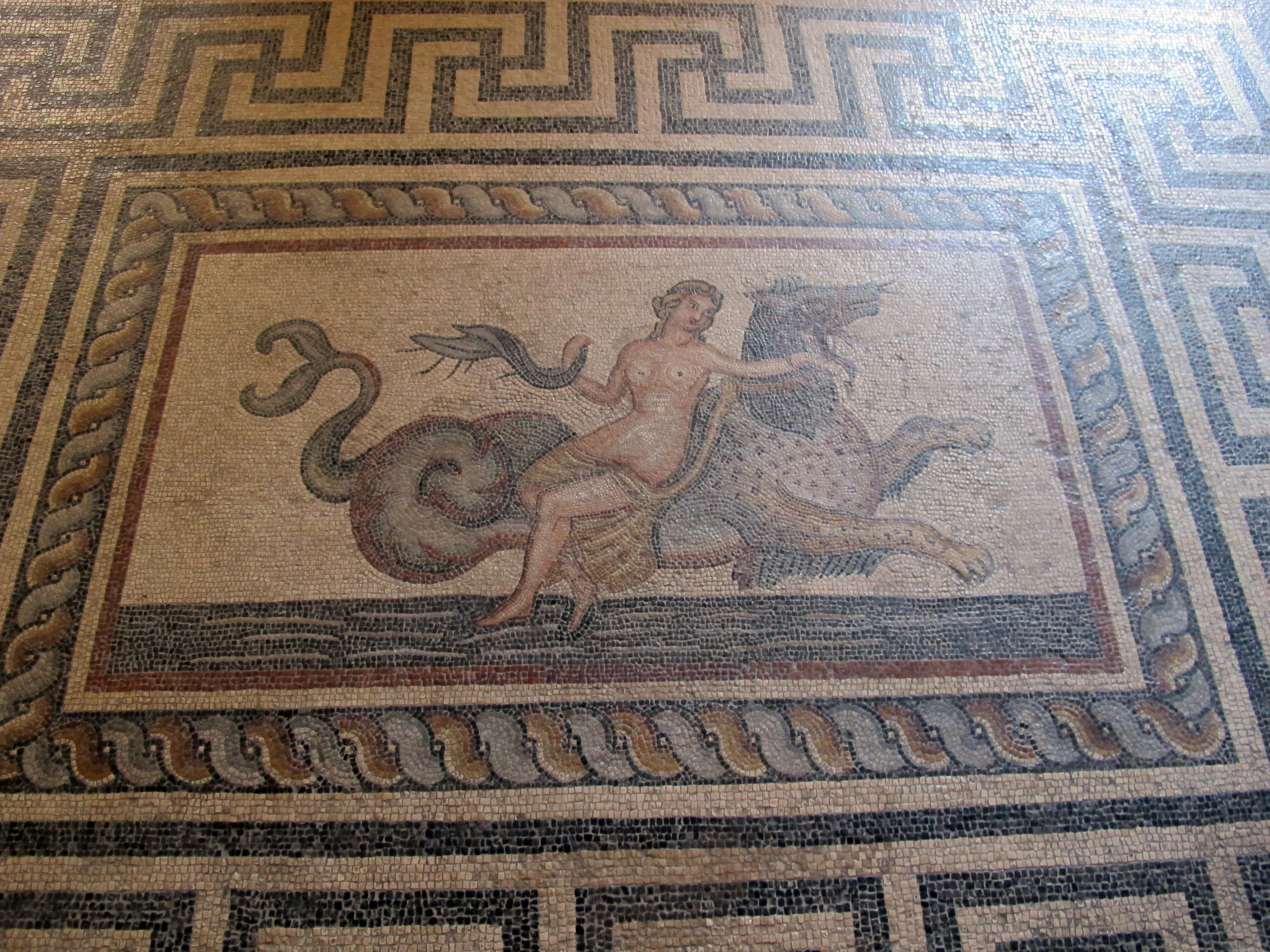
Mosaic of a nymph from the Palace of the Grand Master of the Knights of Rhodes, 2nd century BC

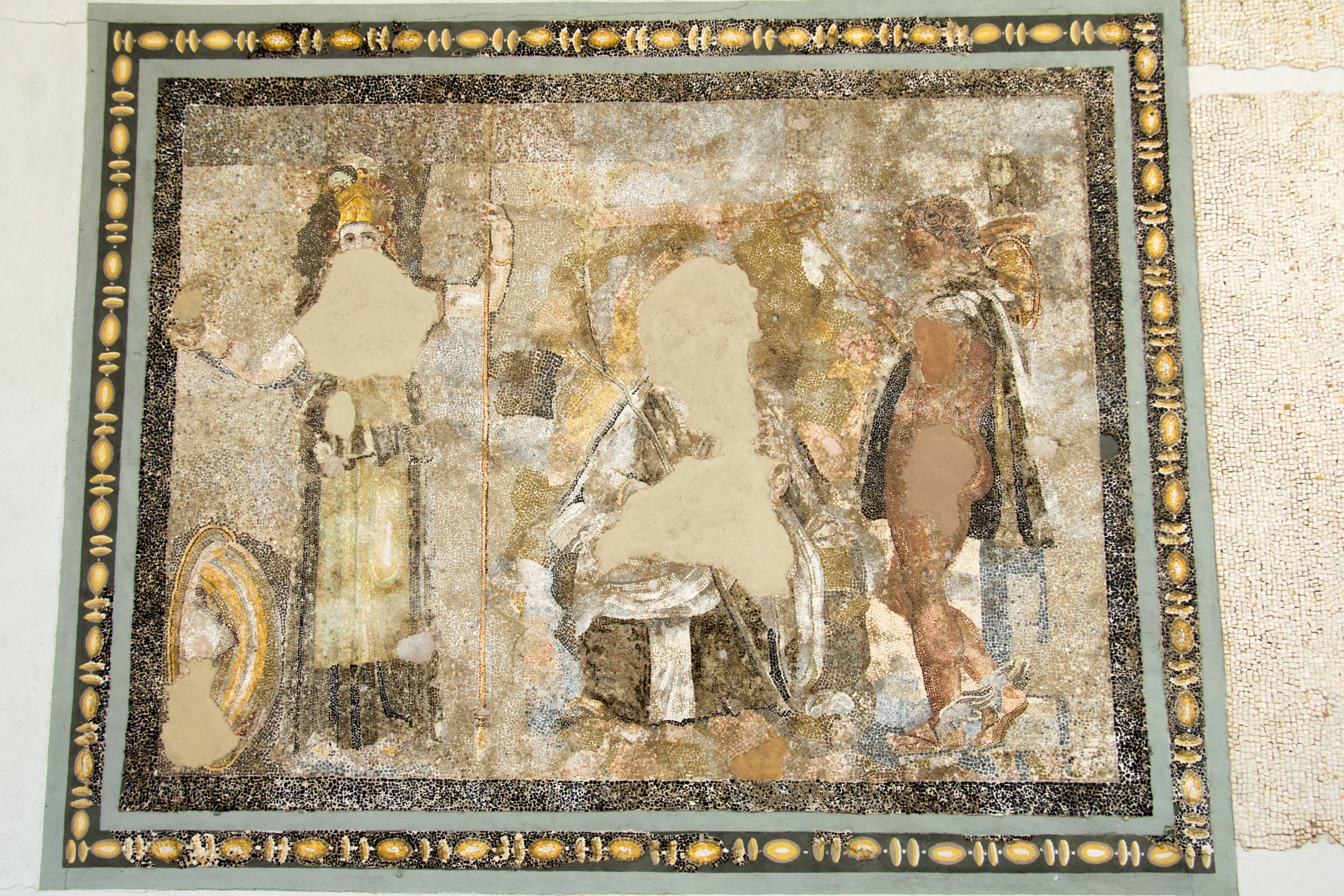
A domestic floor mosaic depicting Athena, from the "Jewelry Quarter" of Delos, Greece, late 2nd or early 1st century BC

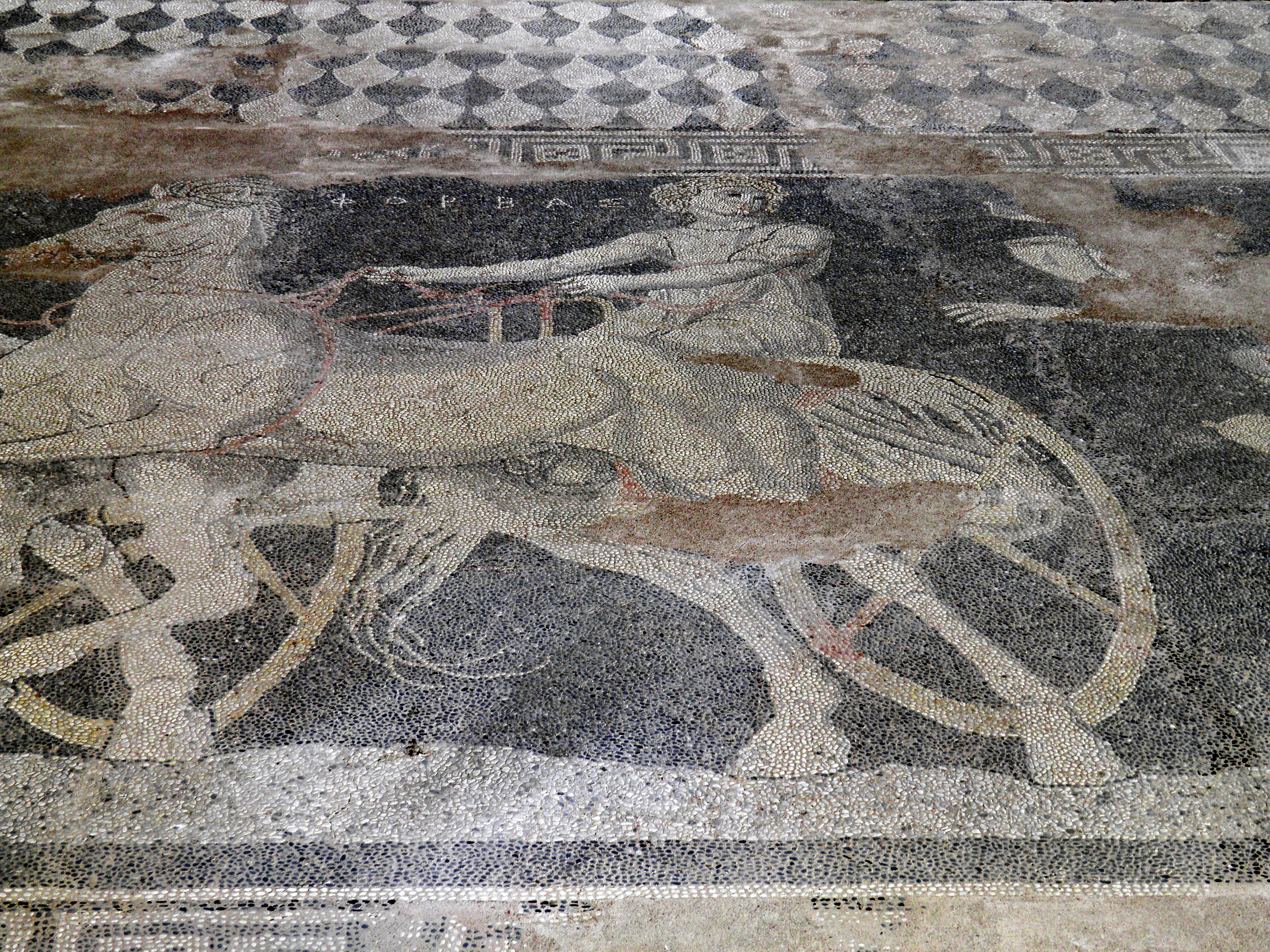
Central panel of the Abduction of Helen of Troy by Theseus, floor mosaic, detail of the charioteer, from the House of the Abduction of Helen, (c. 300 BC), ancient Pella

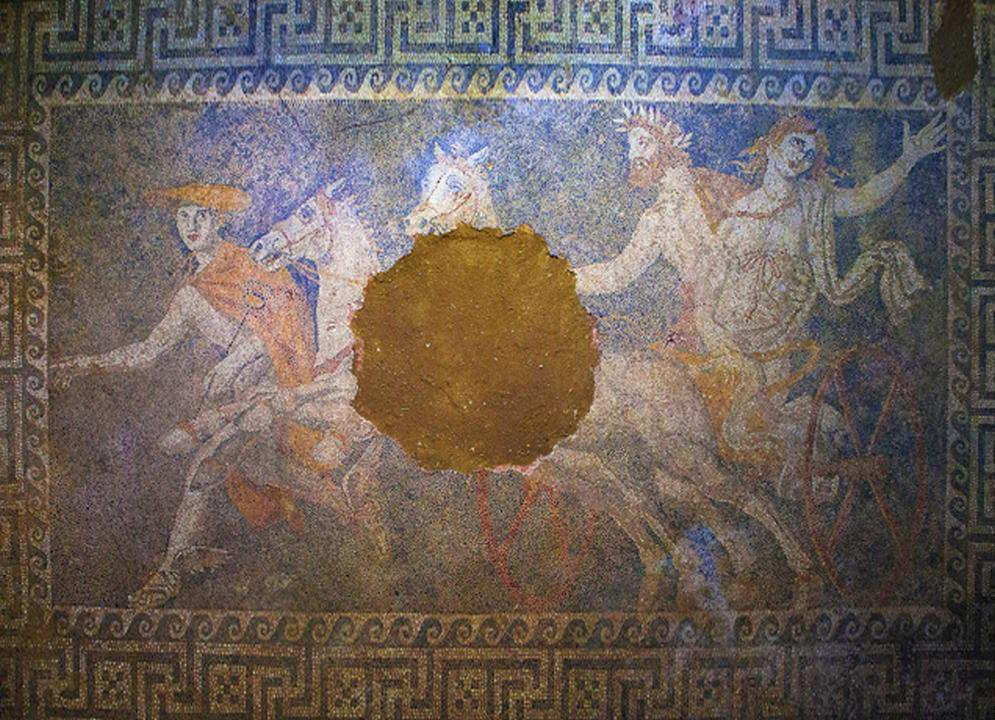
A Macedonian mosaic of the Kasta Tomb in Amphipolis depicting the abduction of Persephone by Pluto, 4th century BC

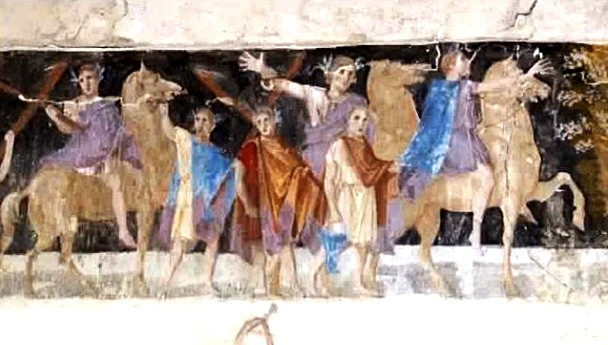
An ancient fresco of Macedonian soldiers from the tomb of Agios Athanasios, Thessaloniki, Greece, 4th century BC

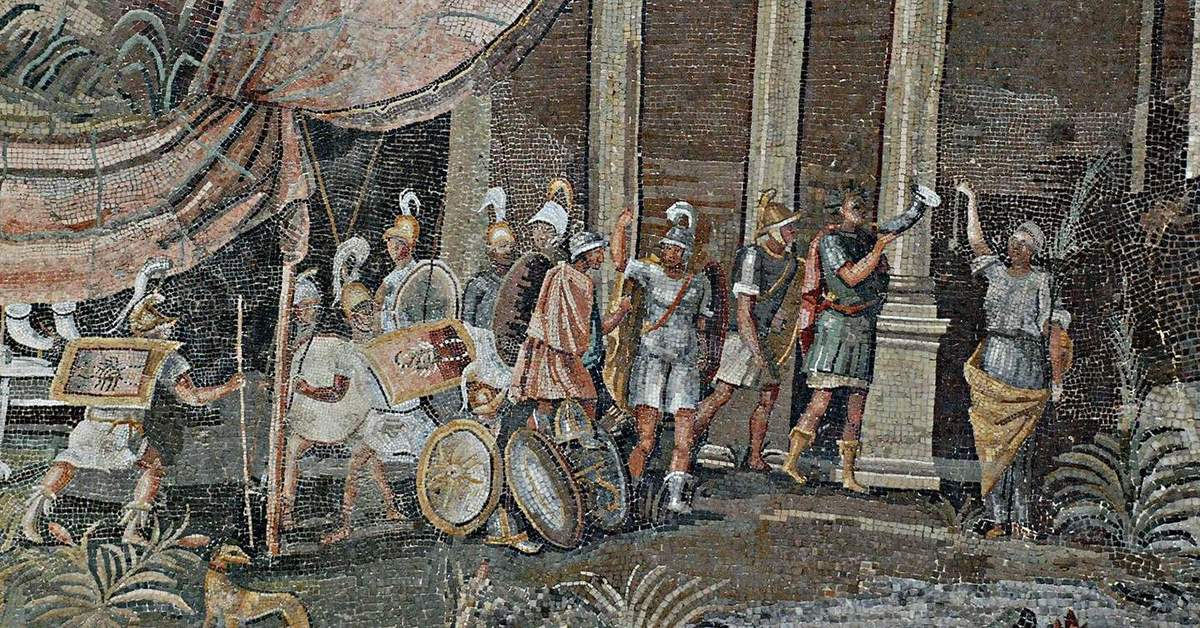
Hellenistic soldiers circa 100 BC, Ptolemaic Kingdom, Egypt; detail of the Nile mosaic of Palestrina.

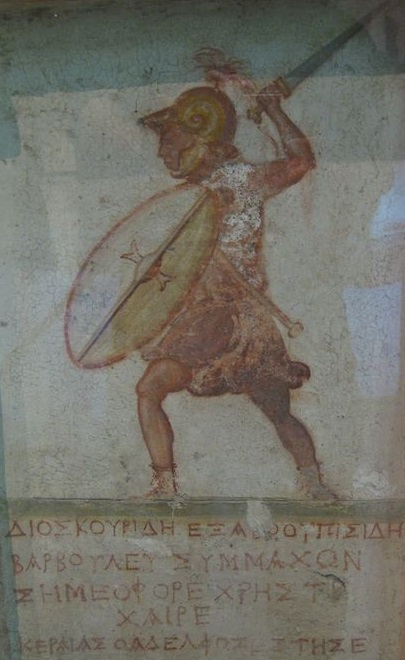
A stele of Dioskourides, dated 2nd century BC, showing a Ptolemaic thureophoros soldier (wielding the thureos shield). It is a characteristic example of the "romanization" of the Ptolemaic army.

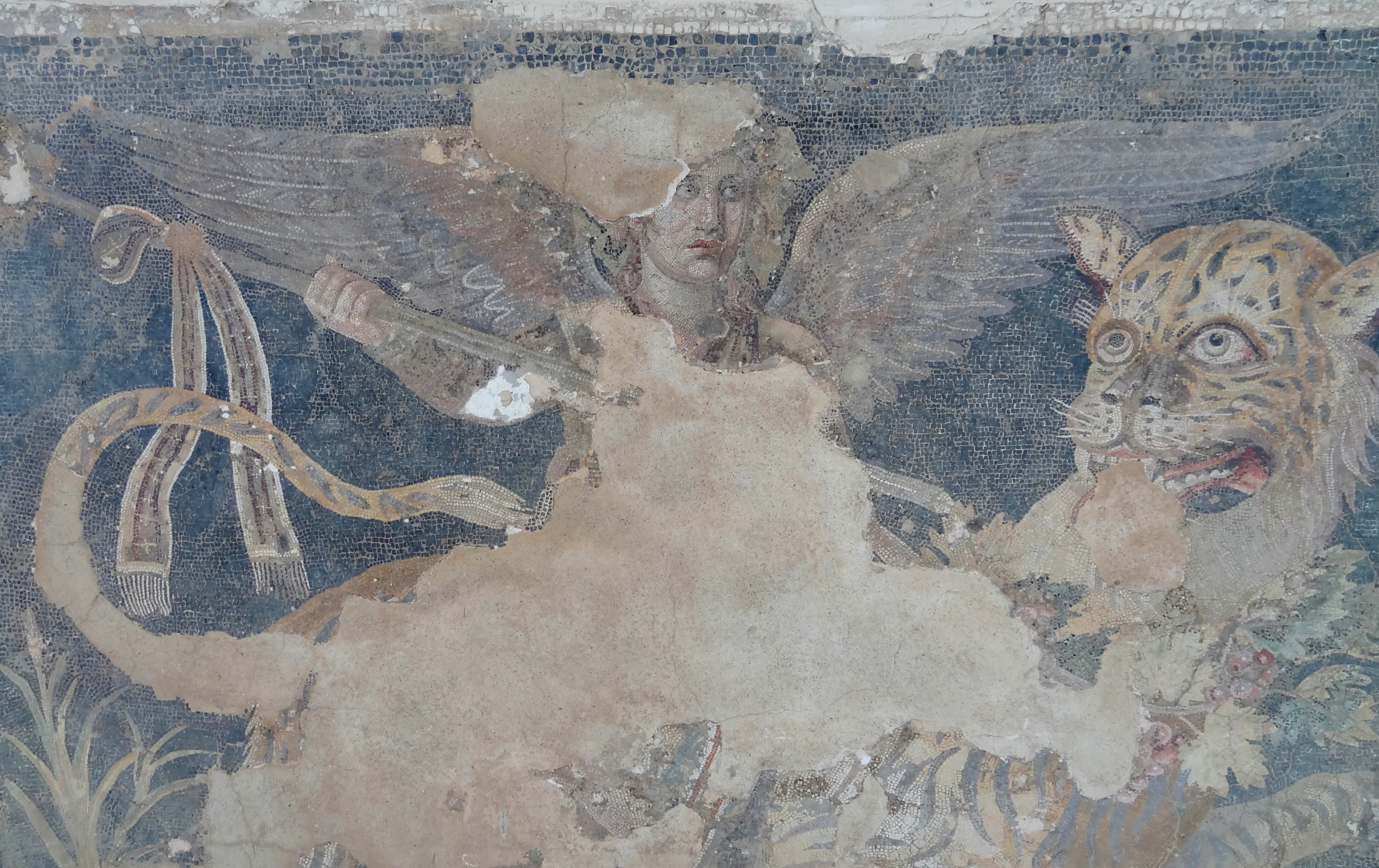
The winged god Dionysus riding a tiger, from the House of Dionysus in Delos, Greece, 2nd century BC

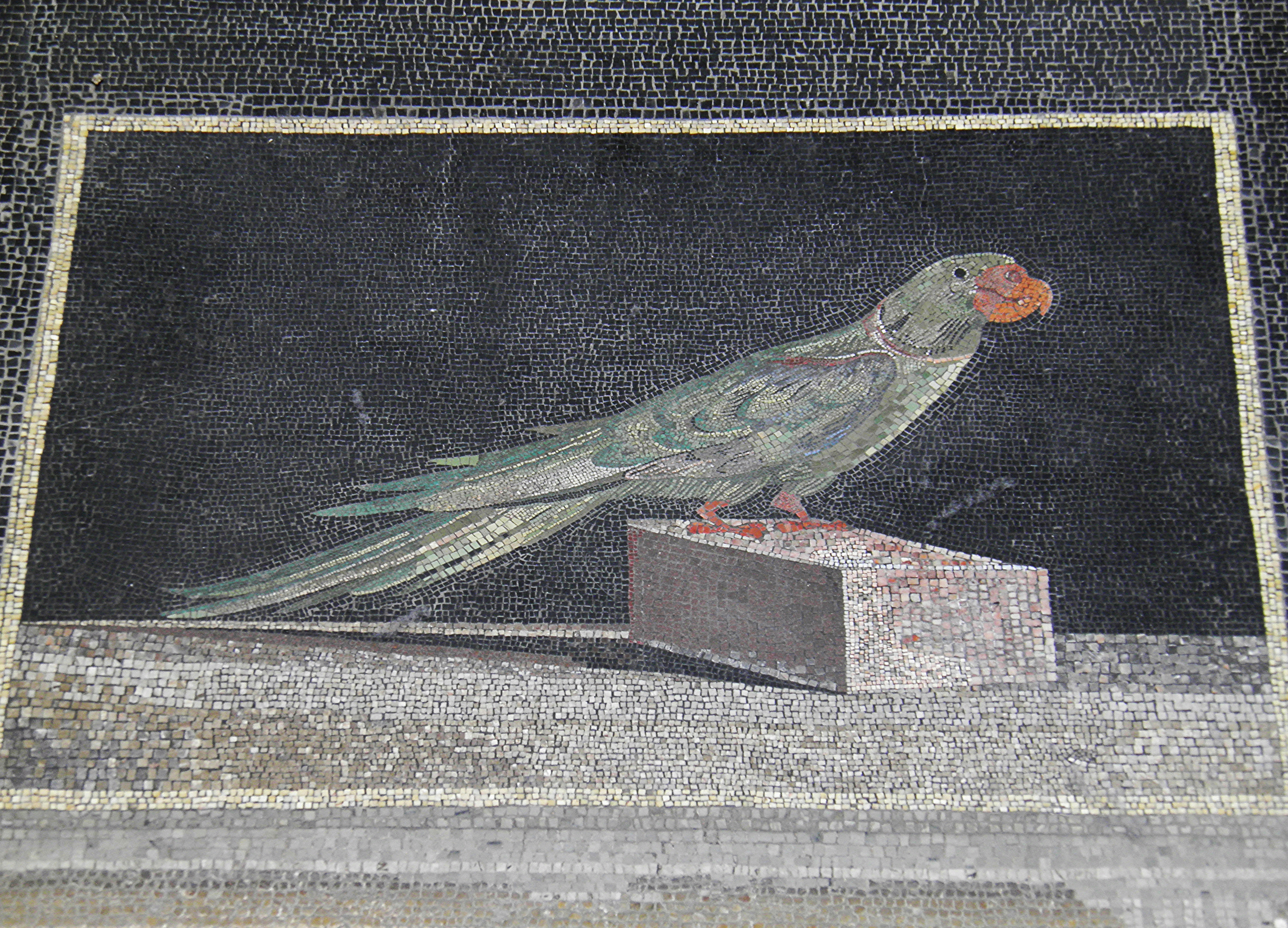
Detail of a Hellenistic mosaic floor panel showing an Alexandrine parakeet, from the acropolis of Pergamon (near modern Bergama, Turkey), dated to the middle of the 2nd century BC (during the reigns of Eumenes II and Attalus II)

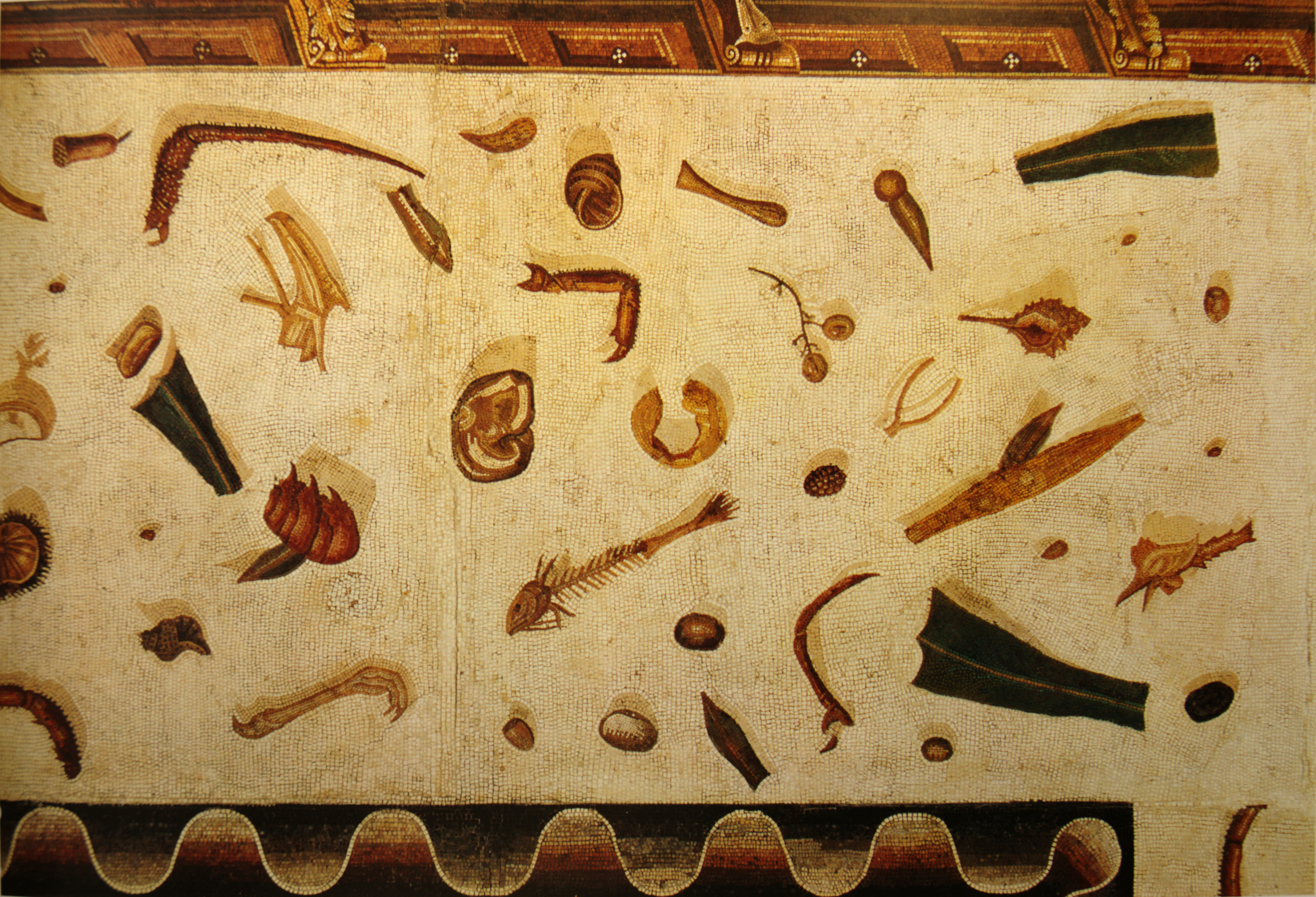
Unswept Floor, Roman copy of the mosaic by Sosus of Pergamon, c. 200 BC

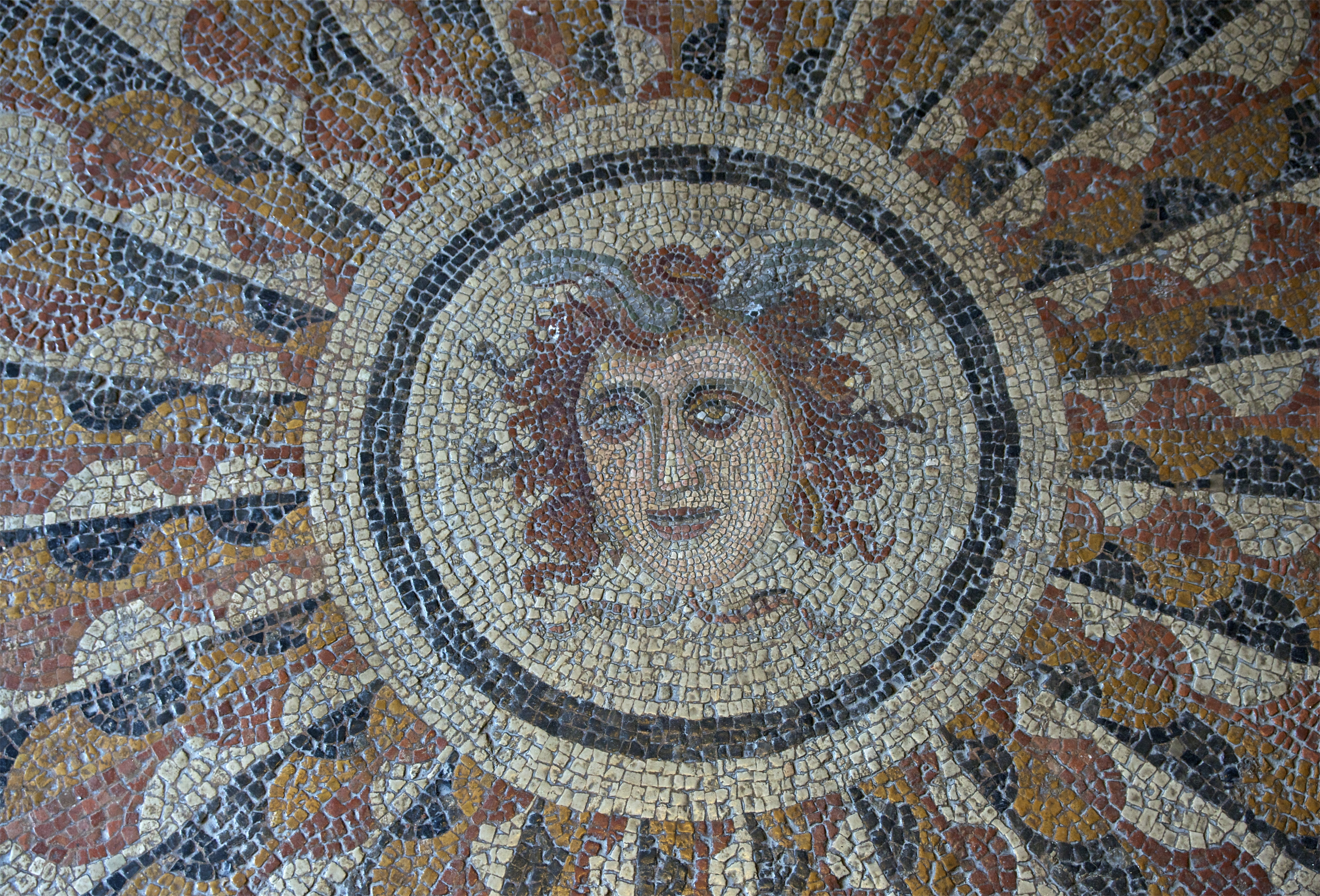
Central motive of the "Medusa" mosaic, 2nd century BC, from Kos island, in the palace of the Grand Master of the Knights of Rhodes, in Rhodes city, island of Rhodes, Greece.

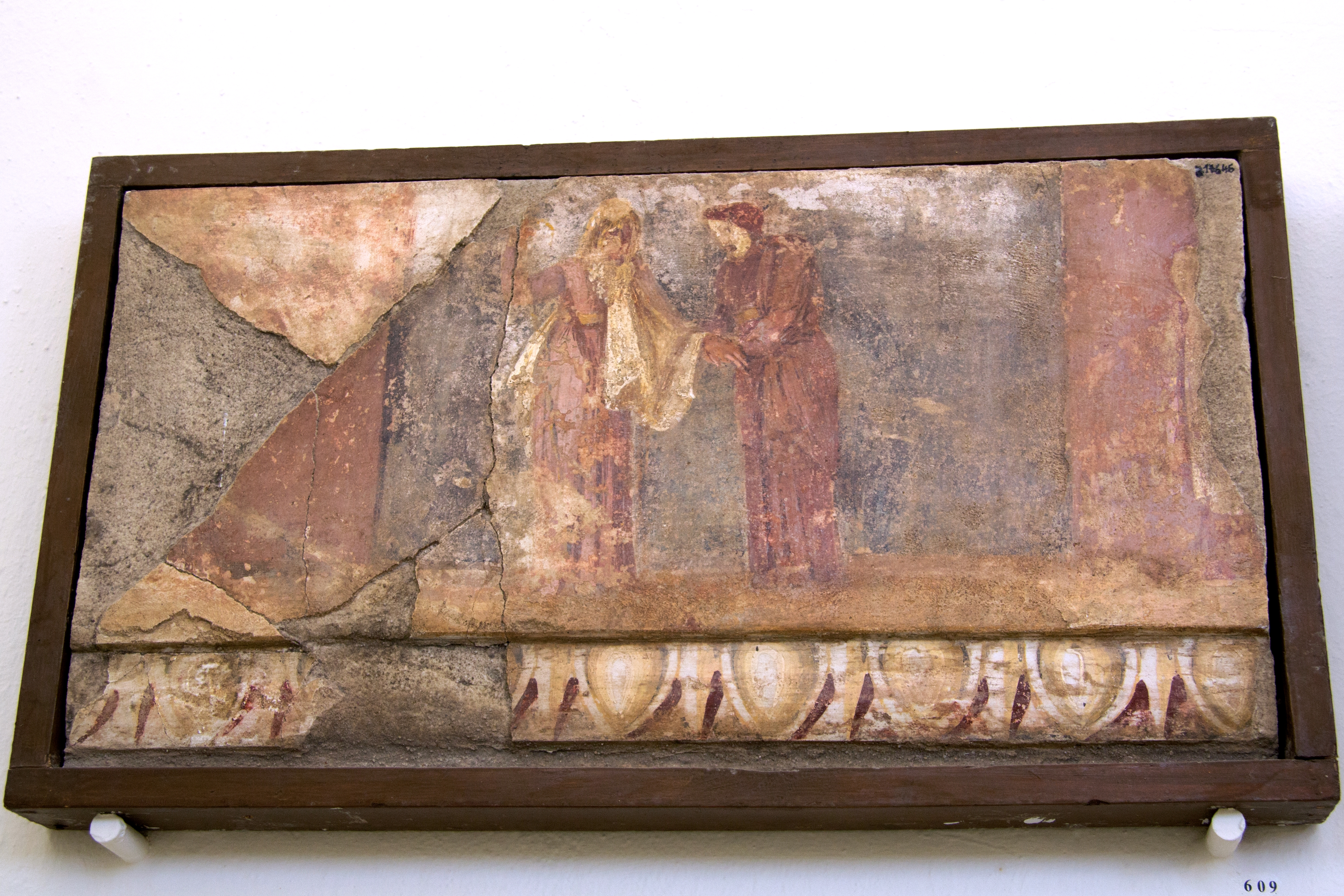
A mural painting from Delos, c. 100 BC

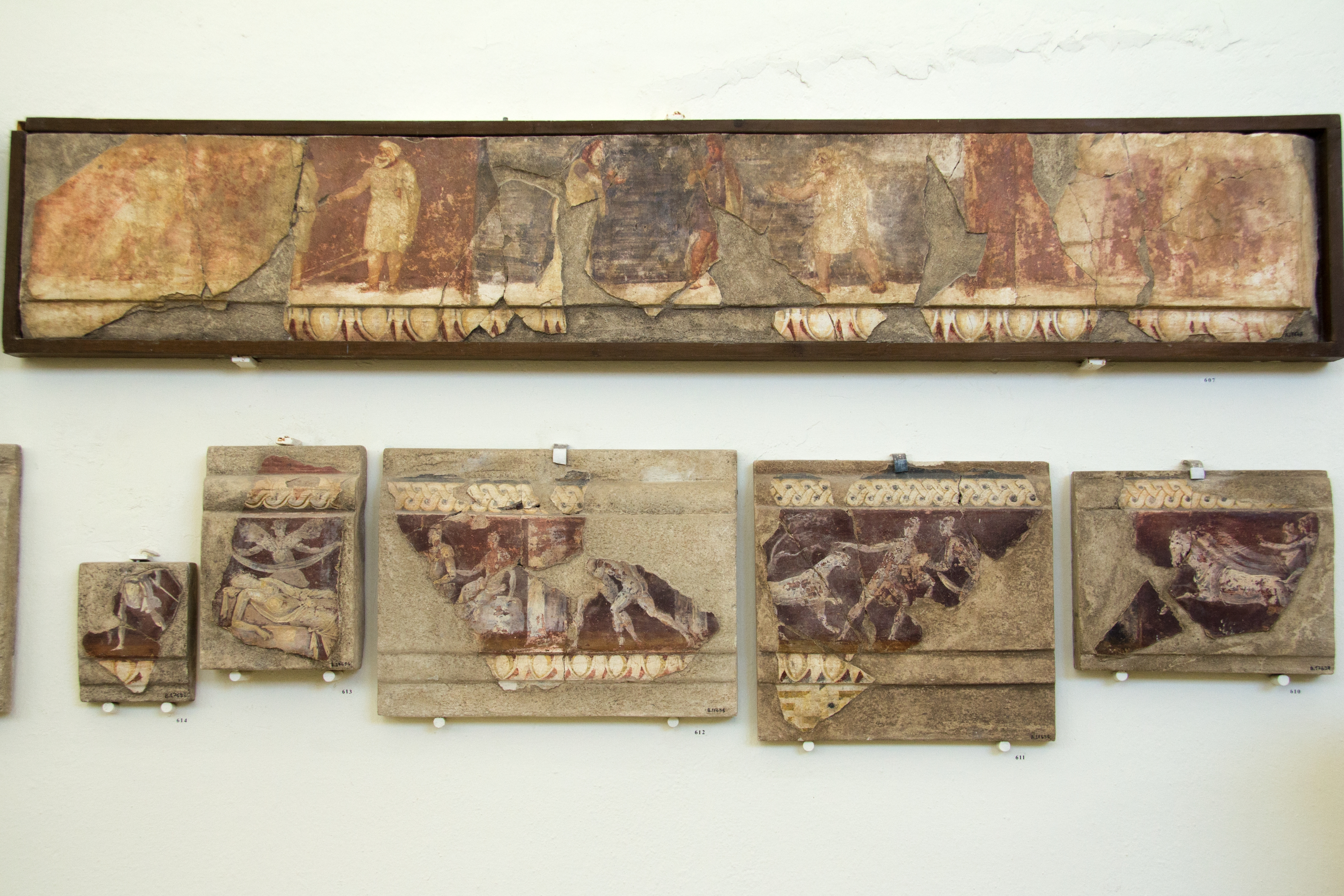
Fragments of mural paintings from Delos, c. 100 BC

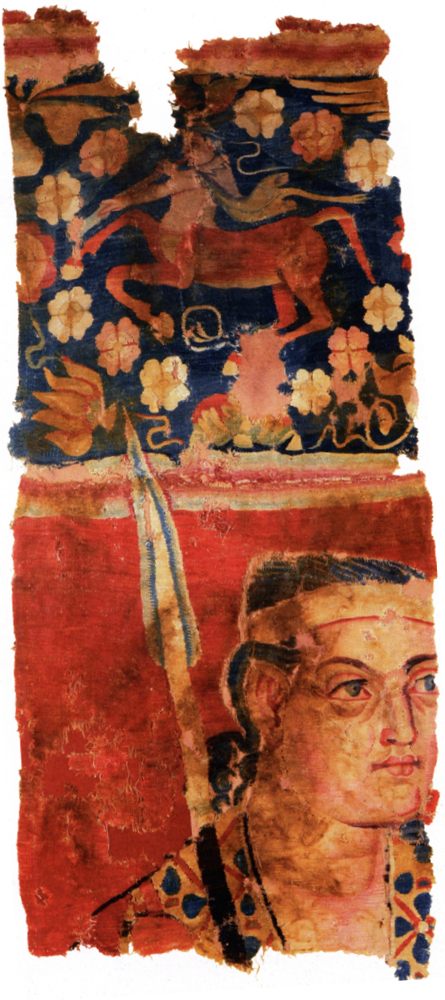
The Sampul tapestry, a woollen wall hanging from Lop County, Hotan Prefecture, Xinjiang, China, showing a possibly Greek soldier from the Greco-Bactrian kingdom (250–125 BC), with blue eyes, wielding a spear, and wearing what appears to be a diadem headband; depicted above him is a centaur, from Greek mythology, a common motif in Hellenistic art; Xinjiang Region Museum.

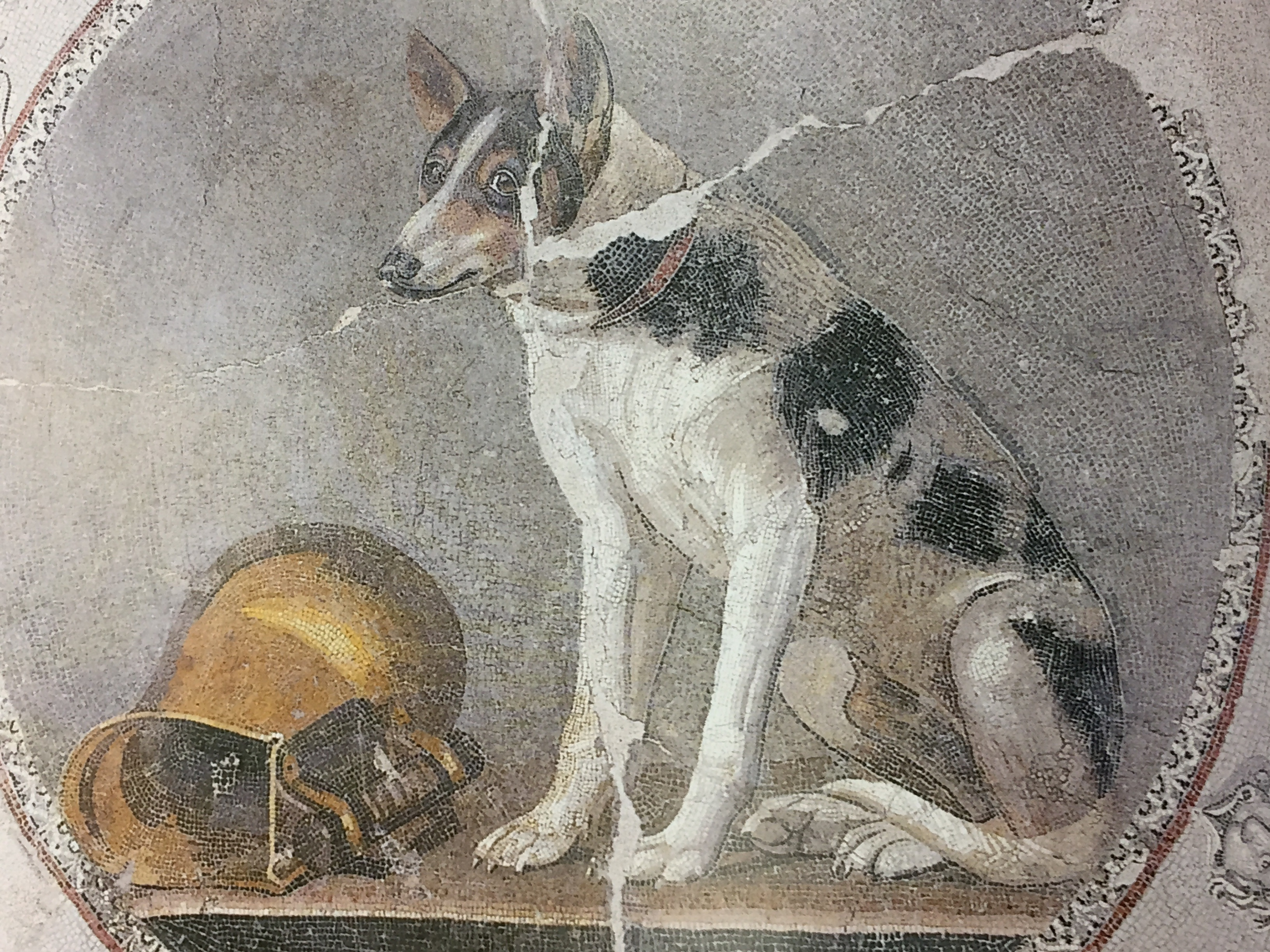
Ptolemaic mosaic of a dog and askos wine vessel from Hellenistic Egypt, dated 200-150 BC, Greco-Roman Museum of Alexandria, Egypt

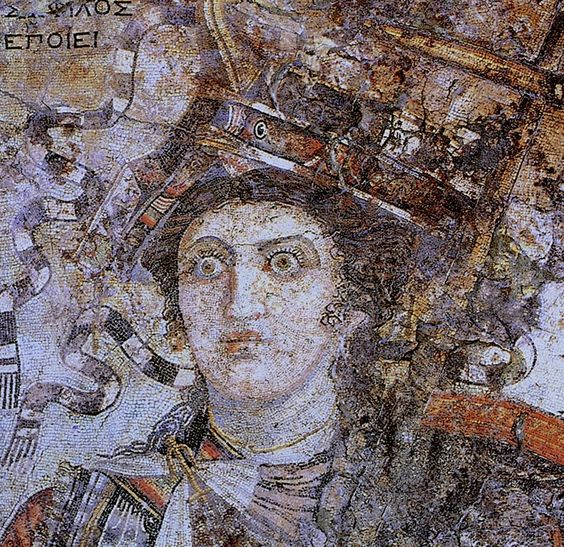
A mosaic from Thmuis (Mendes), Egypt, created by the Hellenistic artist Sophilos (signature) in about 200 BC, now in the Greco-Roman Museum in Alexandria, Egypt; the woman depicted is the Ptolemaic Queen Berenice II (who ruled jointly with her husband Ptolemy III) as the personification of Alexandria.

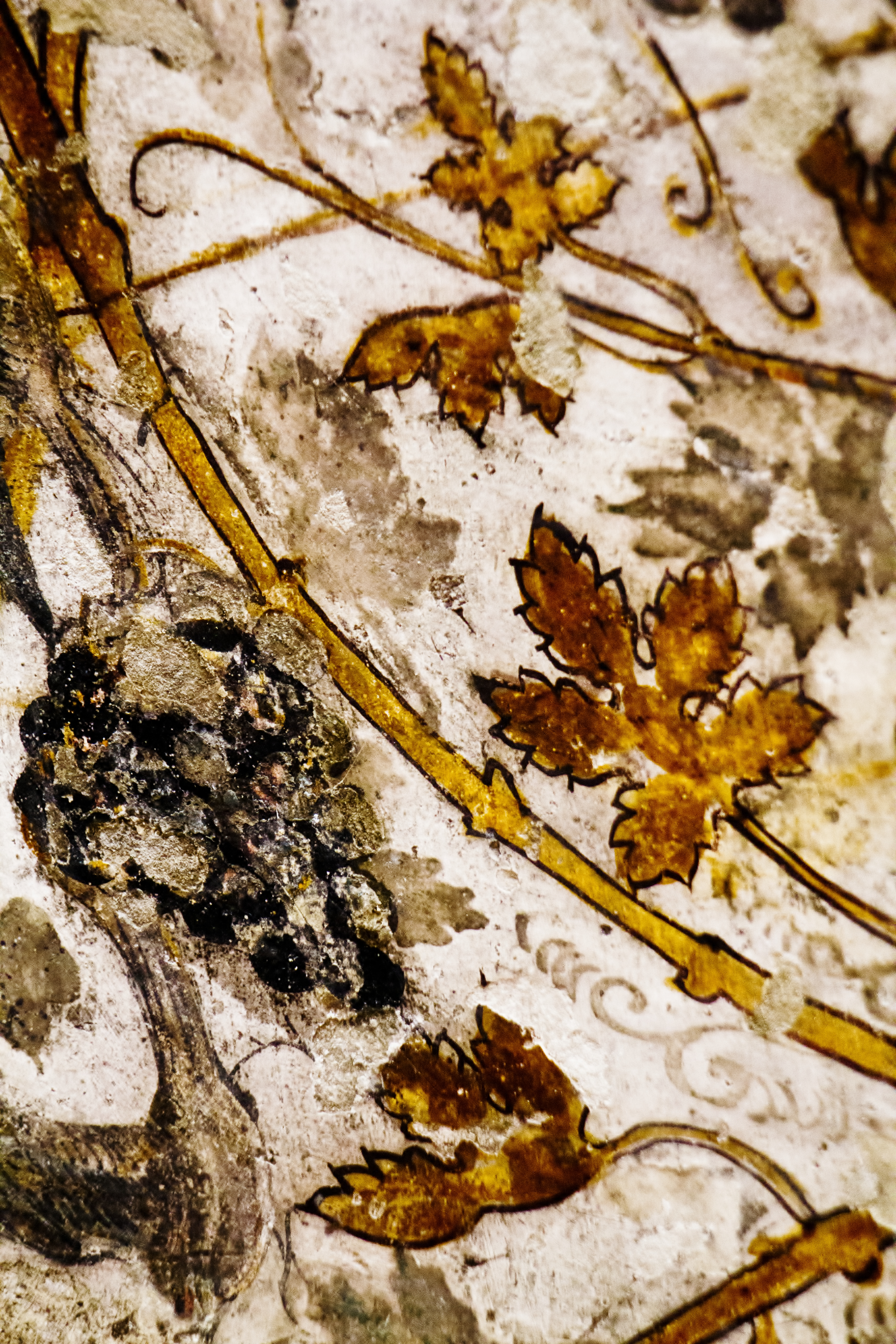
detail of Nabataen ceiling frescoes painted on plastered ceiling.

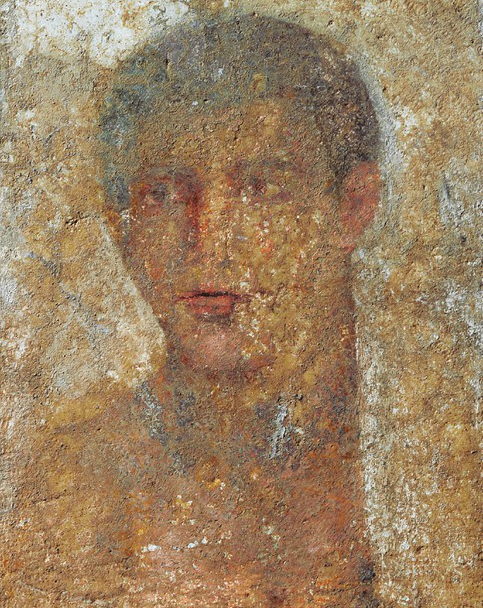
A Hellenistic Greek encaustic painting on marble depicting the portrait of a young man named Theodoros on a tombstone, dated 1st century BC during the period of Roman Greece, Archaeological Museum of Thebes

== Pottery ==
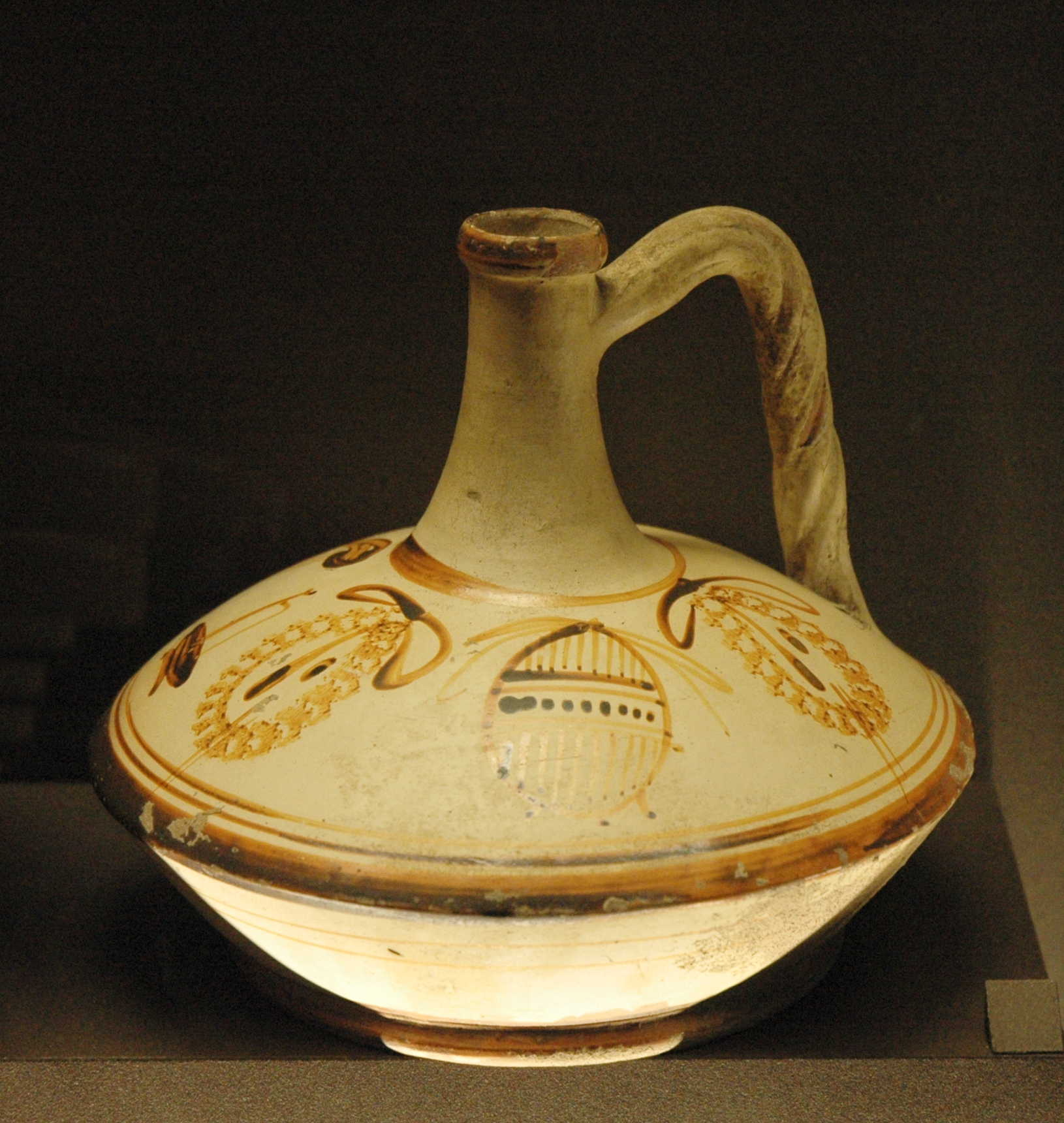
Lagynos decorated with musical instruments, 150‑100 BC, Louvre.

The Hellenistic Age comes immediately after the great age of painted Ancient Greek pottery, perhaps because increased prosperity led to more use of fine metalware (very little now surviving) and the decline of the fine painted "vase" (the term used for all vessel shapes in pottery). Most vases of the period are black and uniform, with a shiny appearance approaching that of varnish, decorated with simple motifs of flowers or festoons. The shapes of the vessels are often based on metalwork shapes: thus with the lagynos, a wine jar typical of the period. Painted vase types that continued production into the Hellenistic period include Hadra vases and Panathenaic amphora.

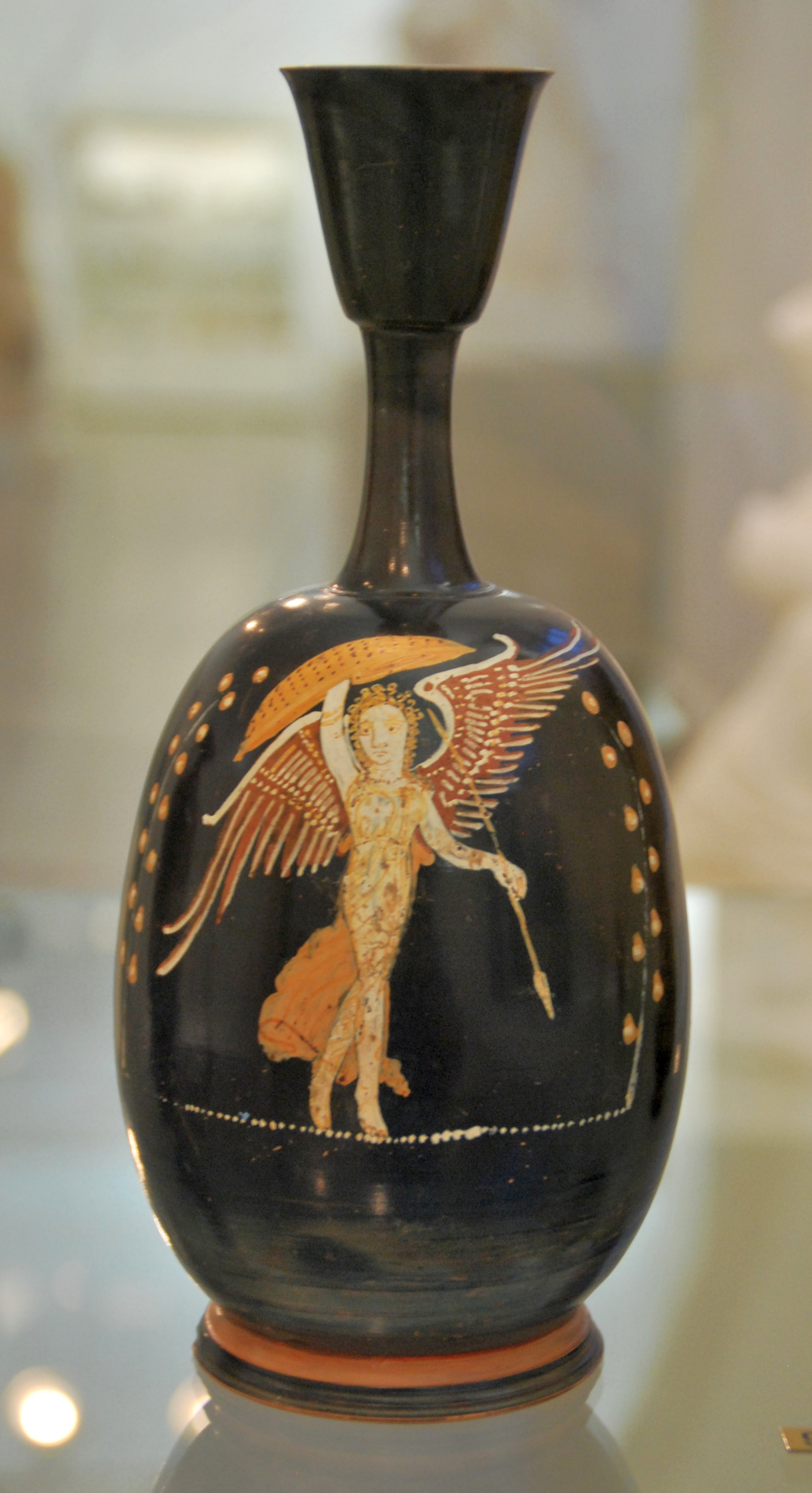
A lekythos bottle in the Gnathia style depicting the winged goddess of victory, Nike, armed and dancing, Apulia (Magna Graecia), Italy

=== Megarian ware ===
It is also the period of so-called Megarian ware: mold-made vases with decoration in relief appeared, doubtless in imitation of vases made of precious metals. Wreaths in relief were applied to the body of the vase. One finds also more complex relief, based on animals or legendary creatures.

==== West Slope ware ====
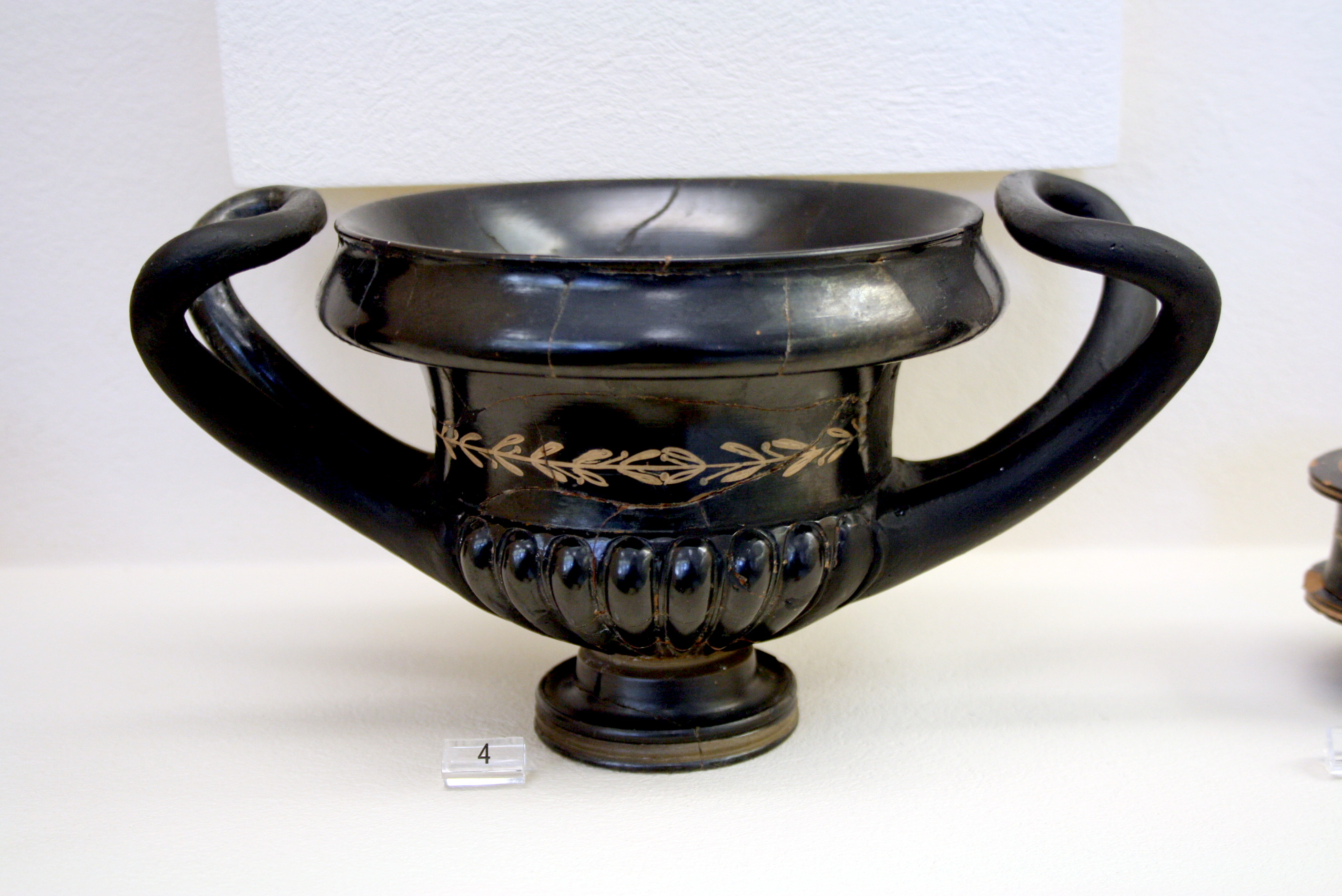
A West Slope Ware kantharos, 330–300 BC, Kerameikos Archaeological Museum, Athens

Red-figure painting had died out in Athens by the end of the 4th century BC to be replaced by what is known as West Slope Ware, so named after the finds on the west slope of the Athenian Acropolis. This consisted of painting in a tan coloured slip and white paint on a fired black slip background with some incised detailing.

Representations of people diminished, replaced with simpler motifs such as wreaths, dolphins, rosettes, etc. Variations of this style spread throughout the Greek world with notable centres in Crete and Apulia, where figural scenes continued to be in demand.

==== Apulian ====
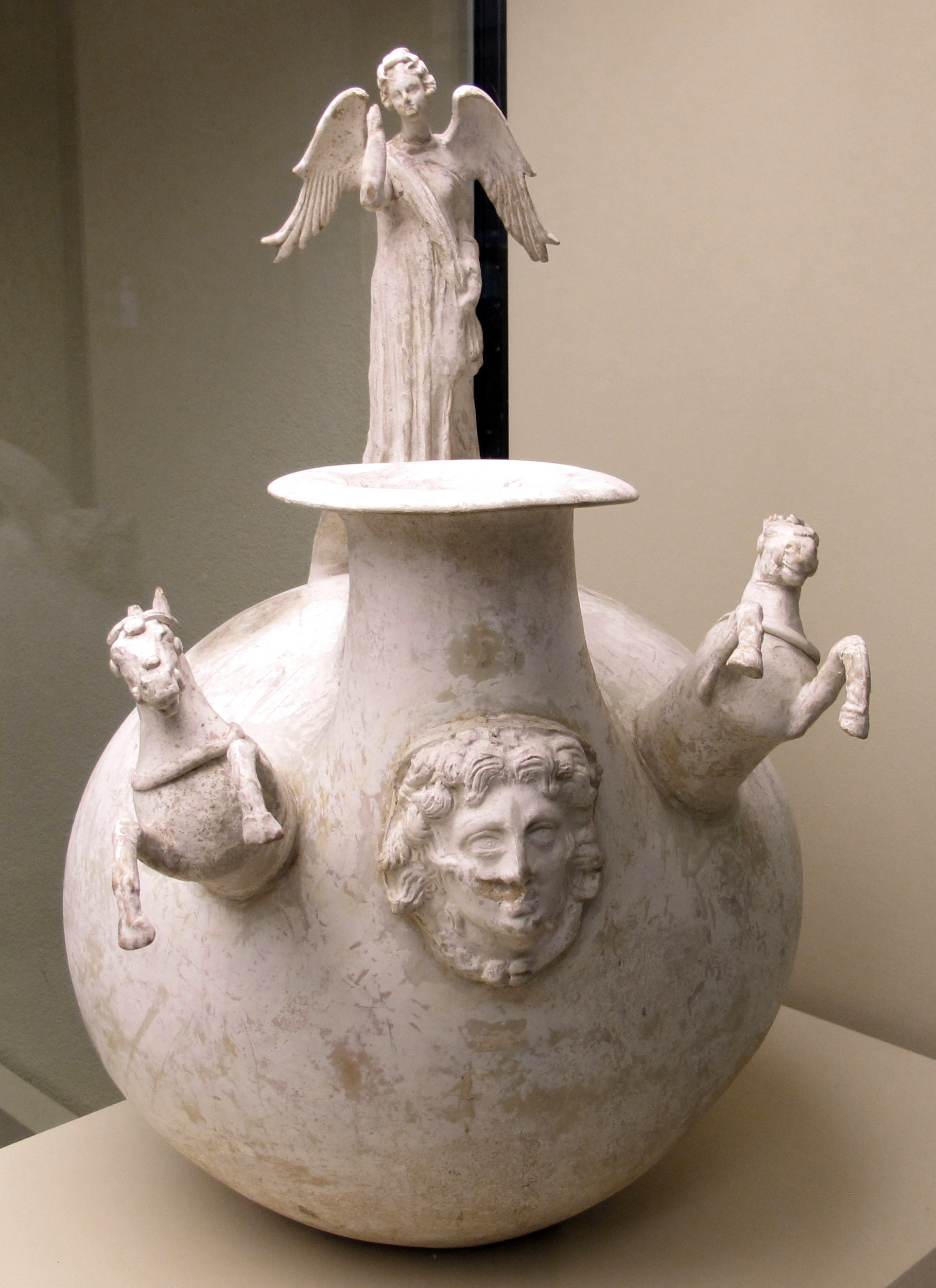
An askos from Canosa di Puglia, depicting goddess Nike, the head of Medusa, and horses, 3rd century BC

===== Gnathia vases =====
Gnathia vases however were still produced not only in Apulian, but also in Campanian, Paestan and Sicilian vase painting.

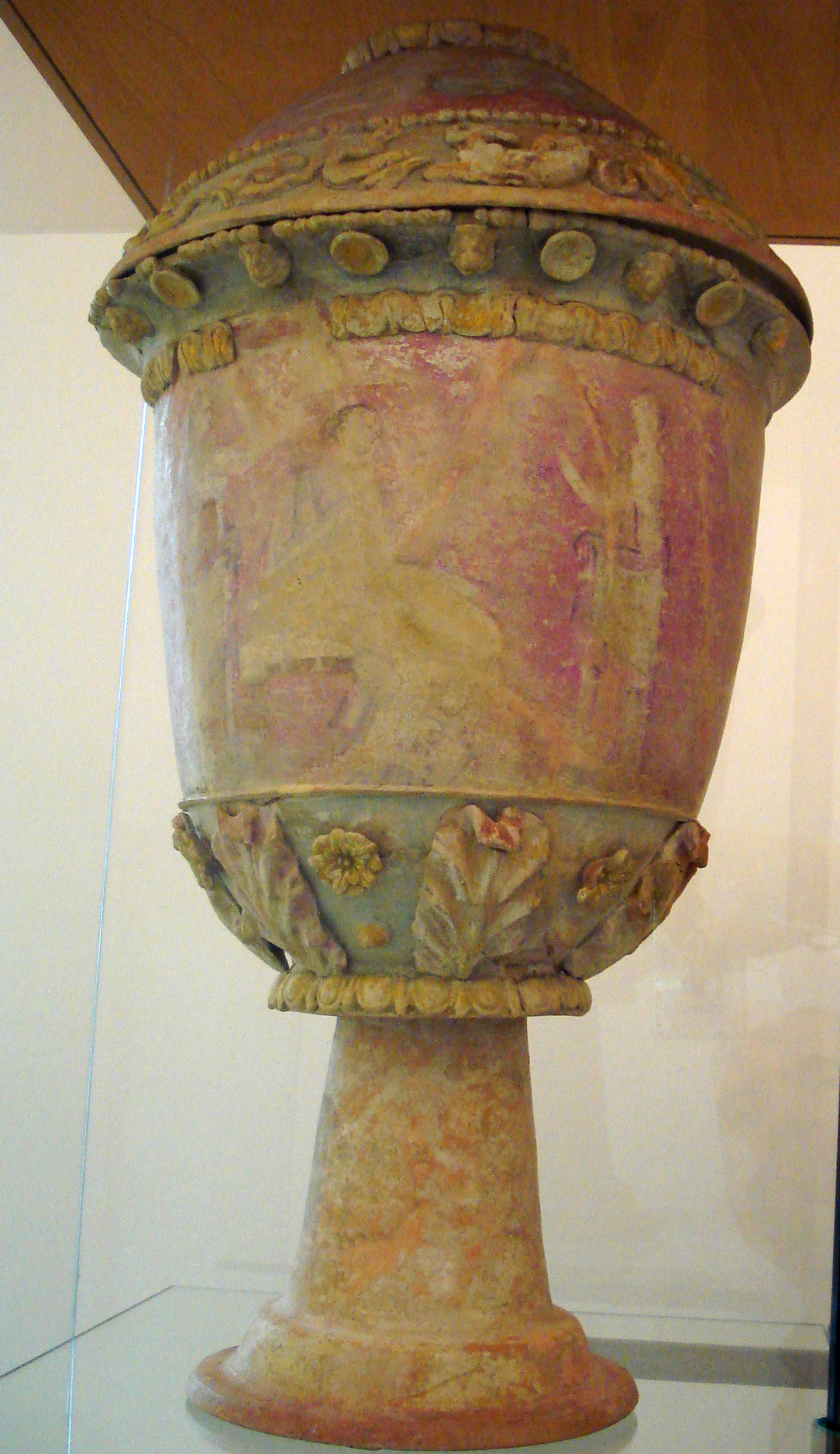
Centuripe vase in Palermo, 280–220 BC

===== Canosa ware =====
In Canosa di Puglia in South Italy, in 3rd century BC burials one might find vases with fully three-dimensional attachments. The distinguishing feature of Canosa vases are the water-soluble paints. Blue, red, yellow, light purple and brown paints were applied to a white ground.

==== Centuripe ware ====
The Centuripe ware of Sicily, which has been called "the last gasp of Greek vase painting", had fully coloured tempera painting including groups of figures applied after firing, contrary to the traditional practice. The fragility of the pigments prevented frequent use of these vases; they were reserved for use in funerals, and many were purely for display, for example with lids that did not lift off. The practice perhaps continued into the 2nd century BC, making it possibly the last vase painting with significant figures. A workshop was active until at least the 3rd century BC. These vases are characterized by a base painted pink. The figures, often female, are represented in coloured clothing: blue-violet chiton, yellow himation, white veil. The style is reminiscent of Pompeii and draws more from grand contemporary paintings than on the heritage of the red-figure pottery.

=== Terracotta figurines ===
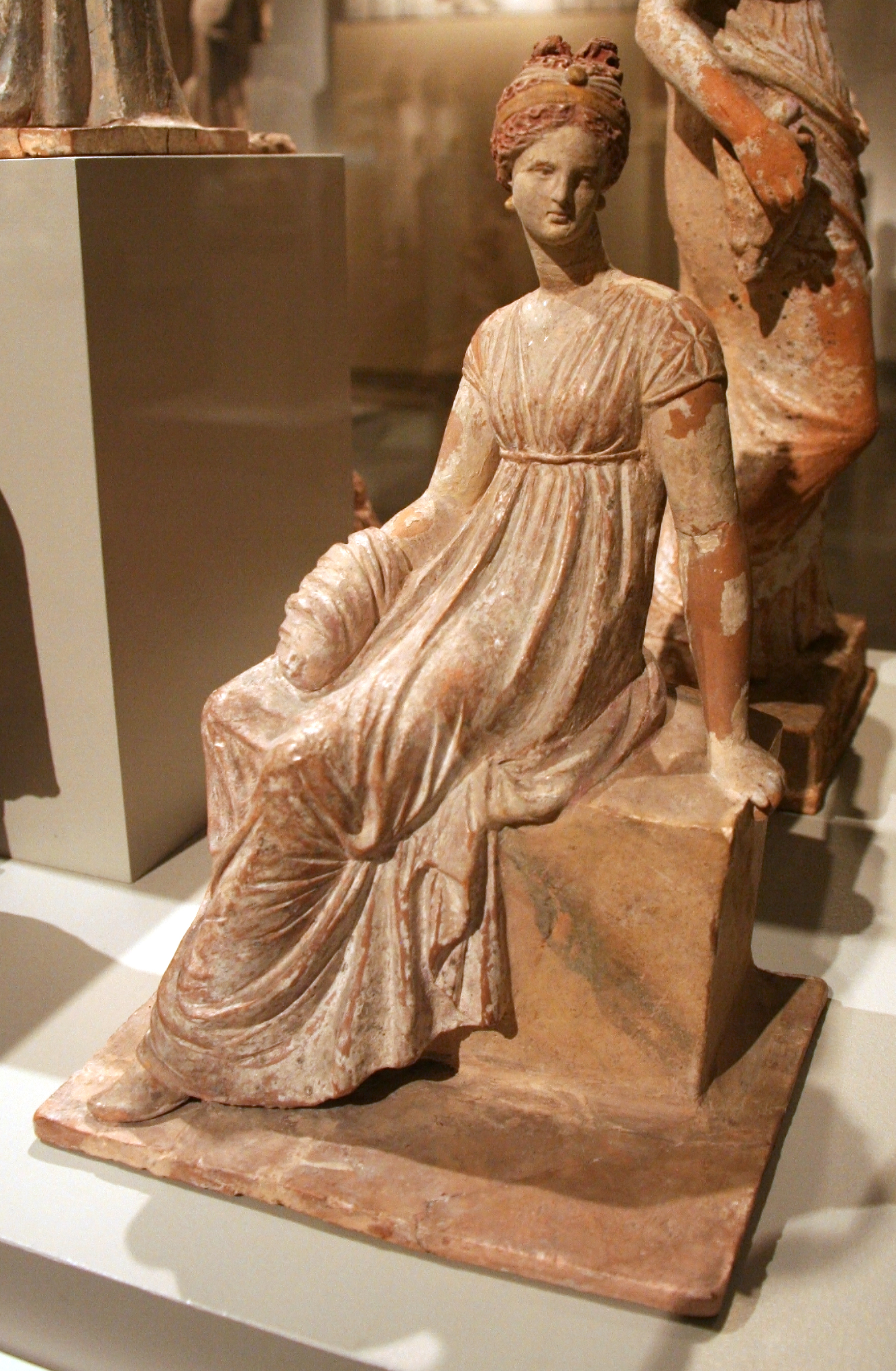
Wealthy 'Middle-class' women: so-called Tanagra figurine, Hellenistic Greece, 325–150 BC, Altes Museum

Bricks and tiles were used for architectural and other purposes. Production of Greek terracotta figurines became increasingly important. Terracotta figurines represented divinities as well as subjects from contemporary life. Previously reserved for religious use, in Hellenistic Greece the terracotta was more frequently used for funerary and purely decorative, purposes. The refinement of molding techniques made it possible to create true miniature statues, with a high level of detail, typically painted.

Several Greek styles continued into the Roman period, and Greek influence, partly transmitted via the Ancient Etruscans, on Ancient Roman pottery was considerable, especially in figurines.

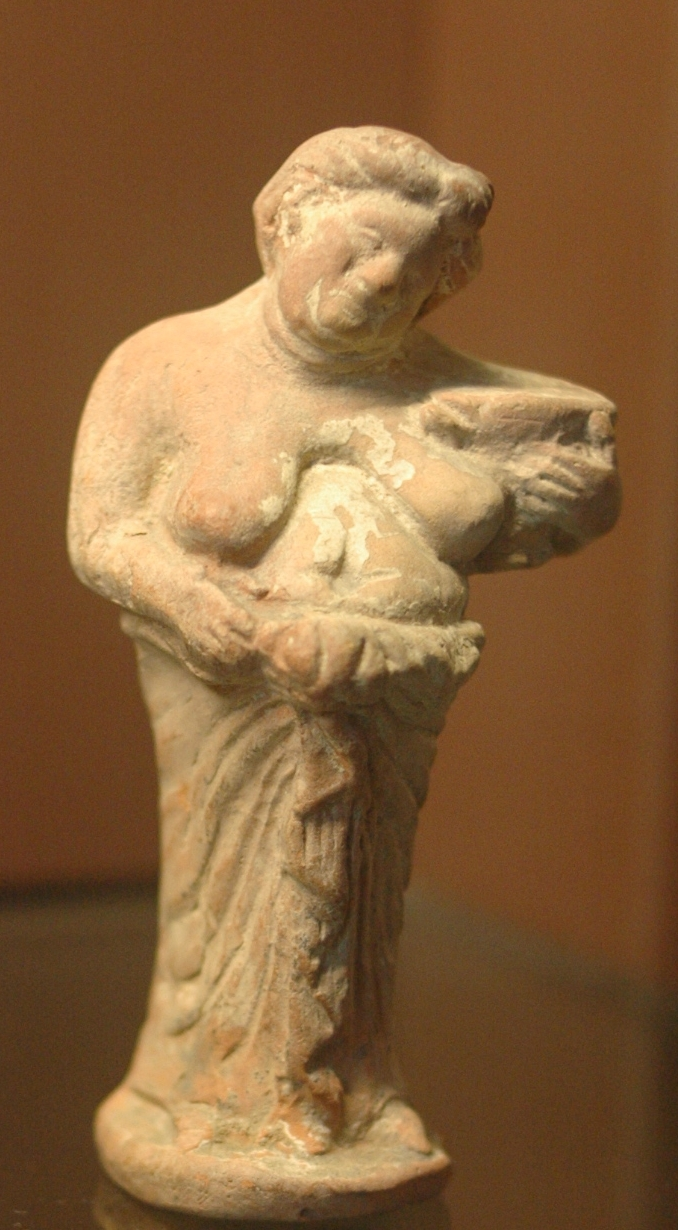
A grotesque woman holding a jar of wine, Kertch, second half of 4th century BC, Louvre.

==== Tanagra figurines ====
Tanagra figurines, from Tanagra in Boeotia and other centers, full of lively colours, most often represent elegant women in scenes full of charm. At Smyrna, in Asia Minor, two major styles occurred side-by-side: first of all, copies of masterpieces of great sculpture, such as the Farnese Hercules in gilt terracotta.

===== Grotesques =====
In a completely different genre, there are the "grotesques", which contrast violently with the canons of "Greek beauty": the koroplathos (figurine maker) fashions deformed bodies in tortuous poses – hunchbacks, epileptics, hydrocephalics, obese women, etc. One could therefore wonder whether these were medical models, the town of Smyrna being reputed for its medical school. Or they could simply be caricatures, designed to provoke laughter. The "grotesques" are equally common at Tarsus and also at Alexandria.

===== Negro =====
One theme which emerged was the "negro", particularly in Ptolemaic Egypt: these statuettes of Black adolescents were successful up to the Roman period. Sometimes, they were reduced to echoing a form from the great sculptures: thus one finds numerous copies in miniature of the Tyche (Fortune or Chance) of Antioch, of which the original dates to the beginning of the 3rd century BC.

Hellenistic pottery designs can be found in the city of Taxila in modern Pakistan, which was colonized with Greek artisans and potters after Alexander conquered it.

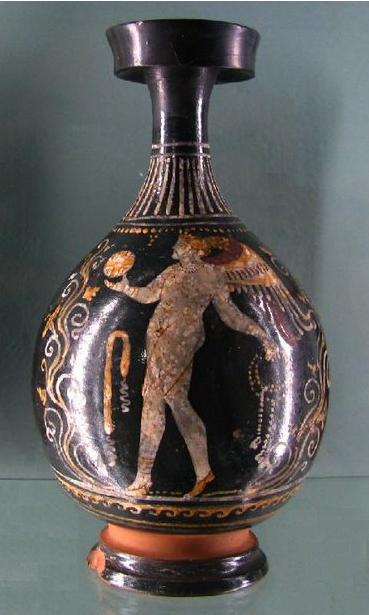
A bottle (Lekythos) in Gnathia style - Eros, with a painting depicting a figure playing with a ball, Apulia (Magna Graecia), Italy, third quarter of the 4th century BC

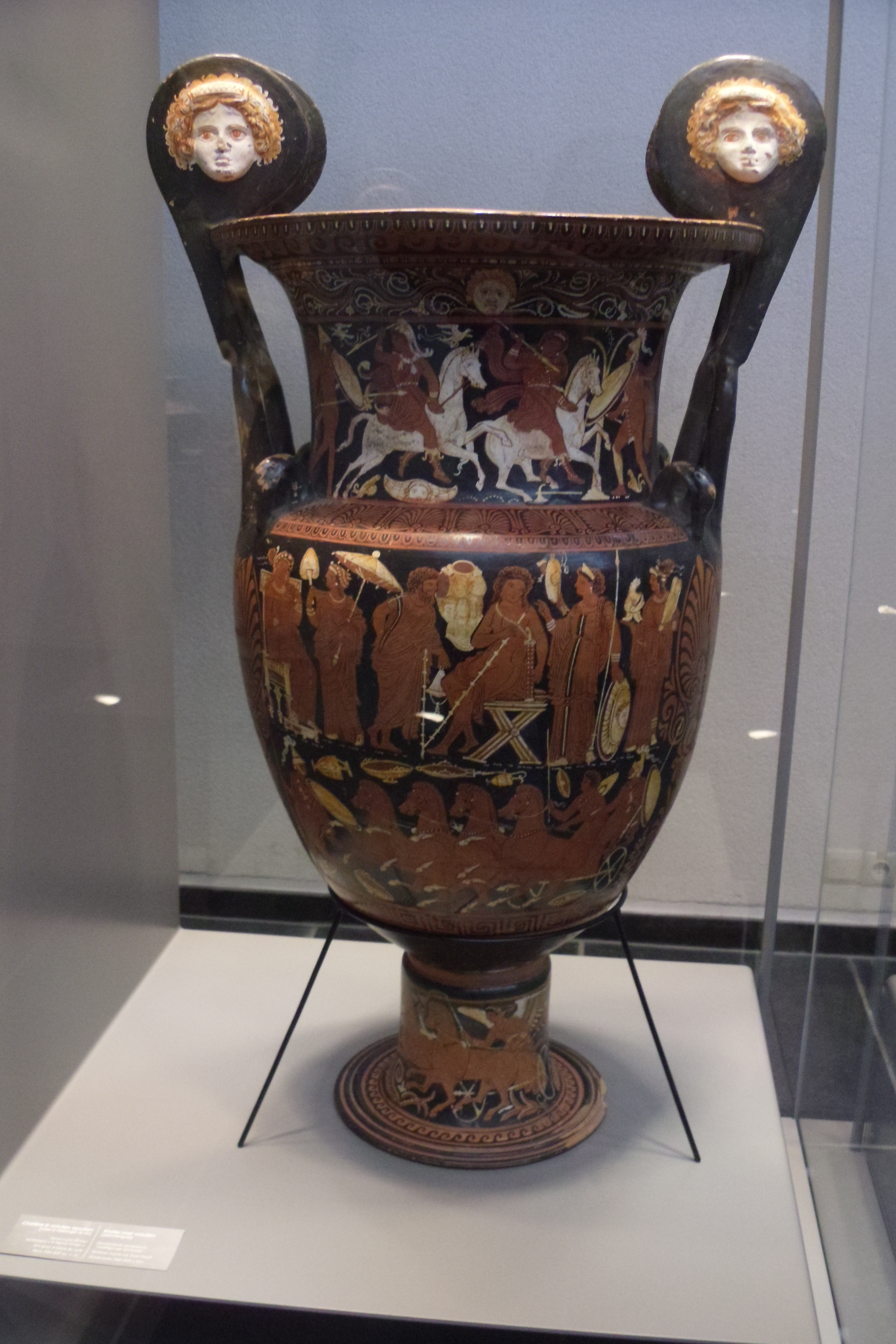
Krater, Apulian vase painting with relief decorations, 330-320 BC

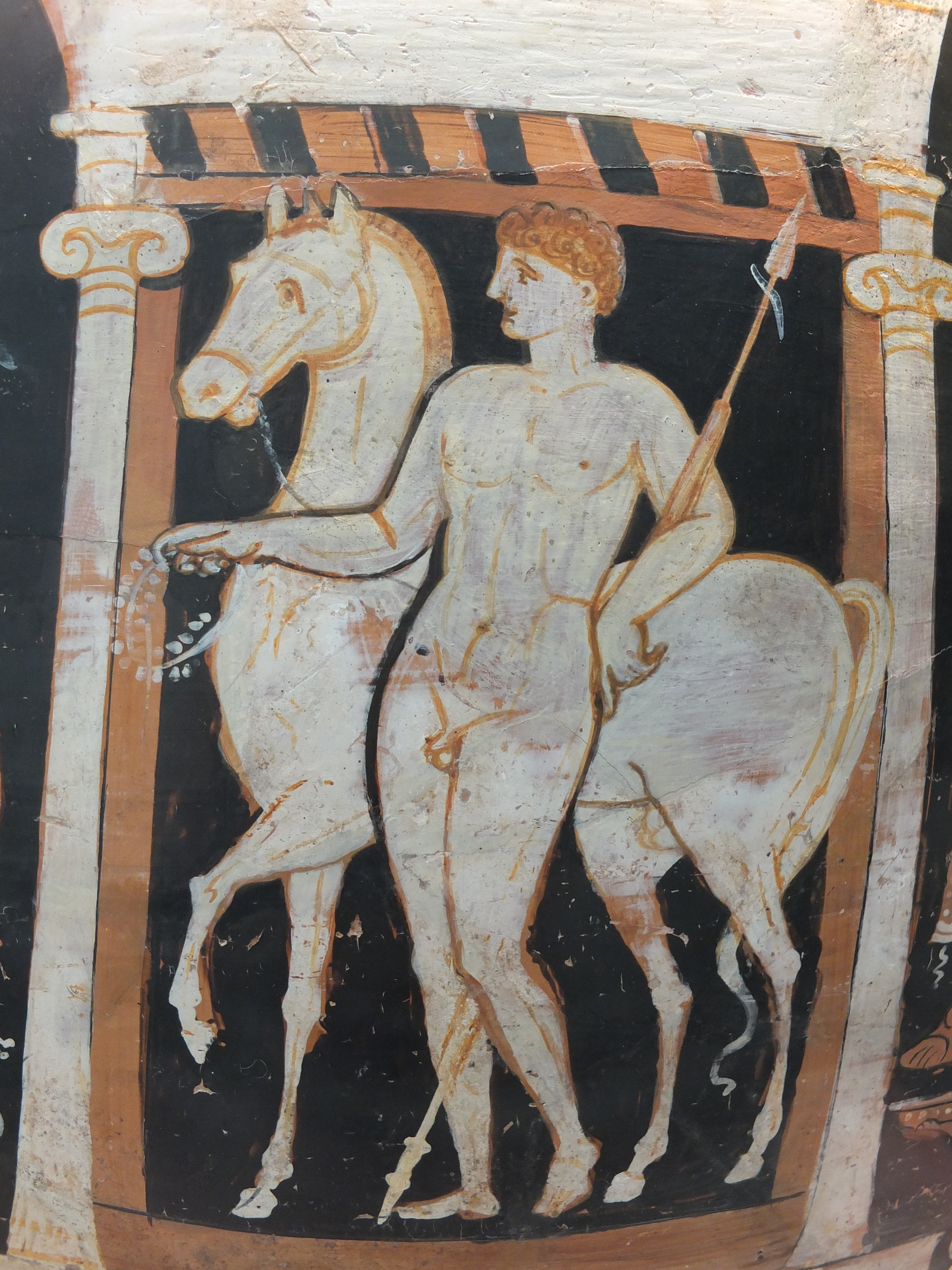
Krater with volutes in terracotta; Greek art from Southern Italy, c. 330-320 BC.

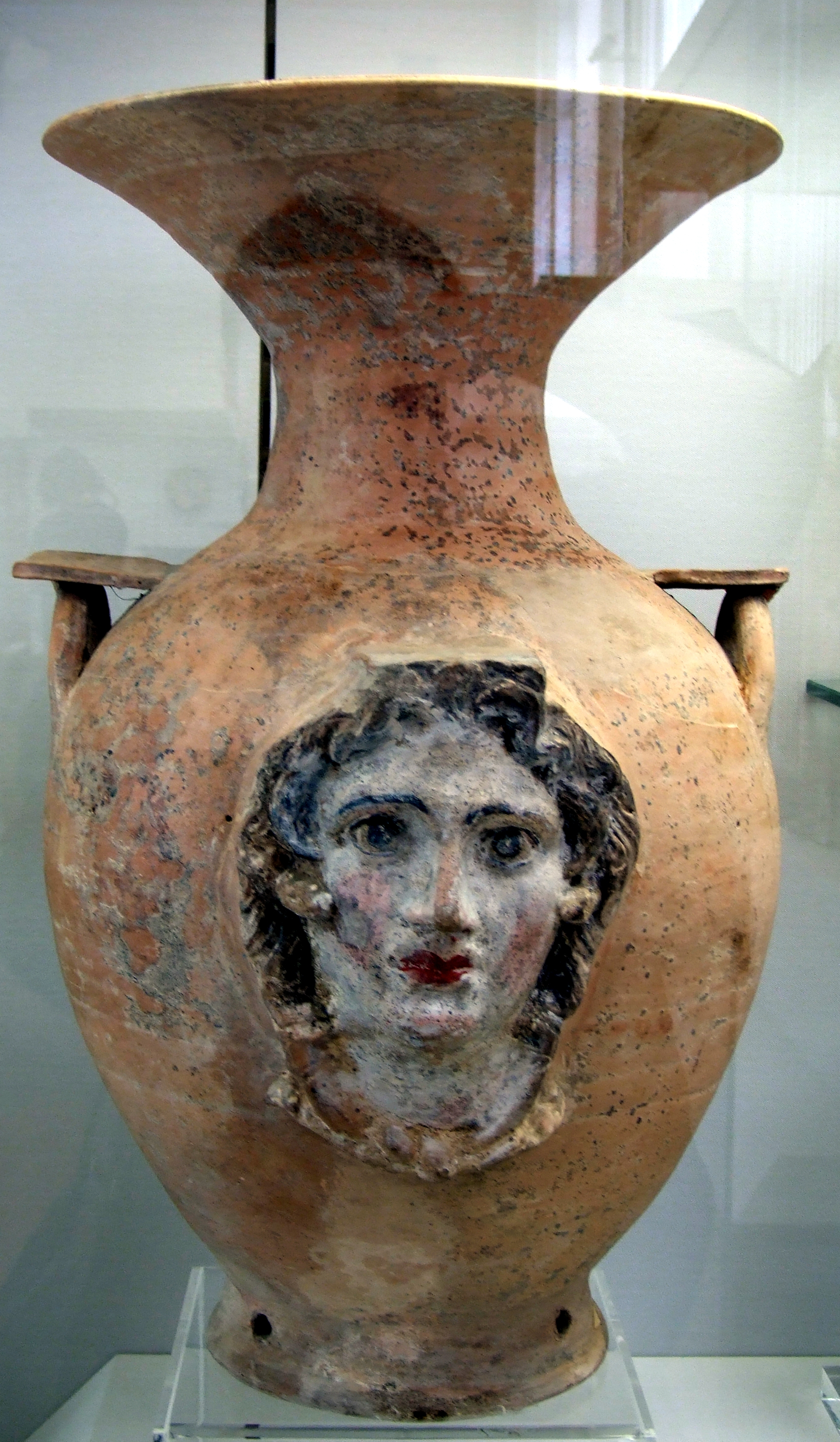
A sphageion with gorgoneions, from South Italy, Canosa di Puglia, late 4th to early 3rd century BC, clay, slip, paint. Pushkin Museum, Moscow

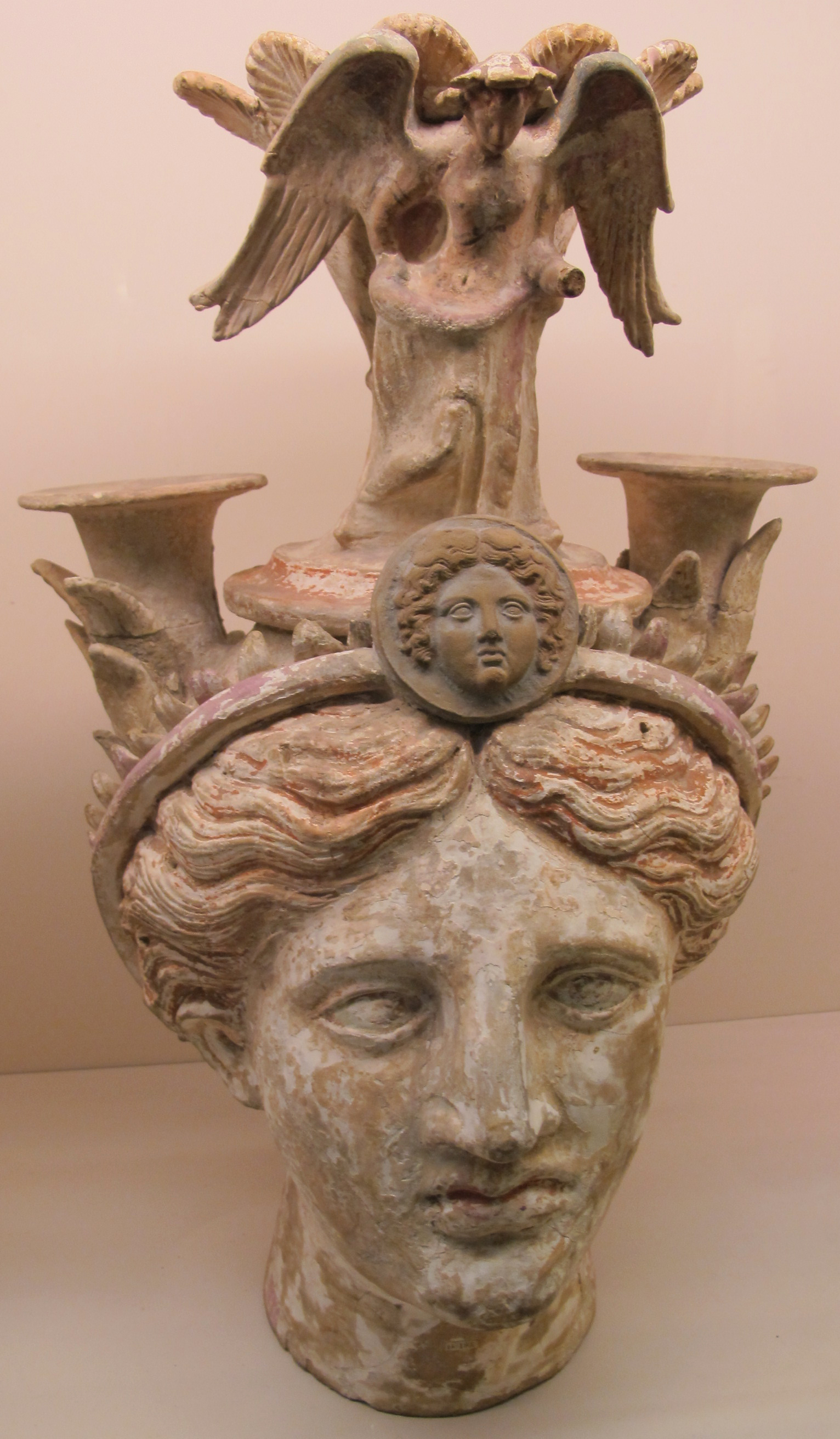
An askos in the shape of a woman's head, 270-200 BC, from Canosa di Puglia

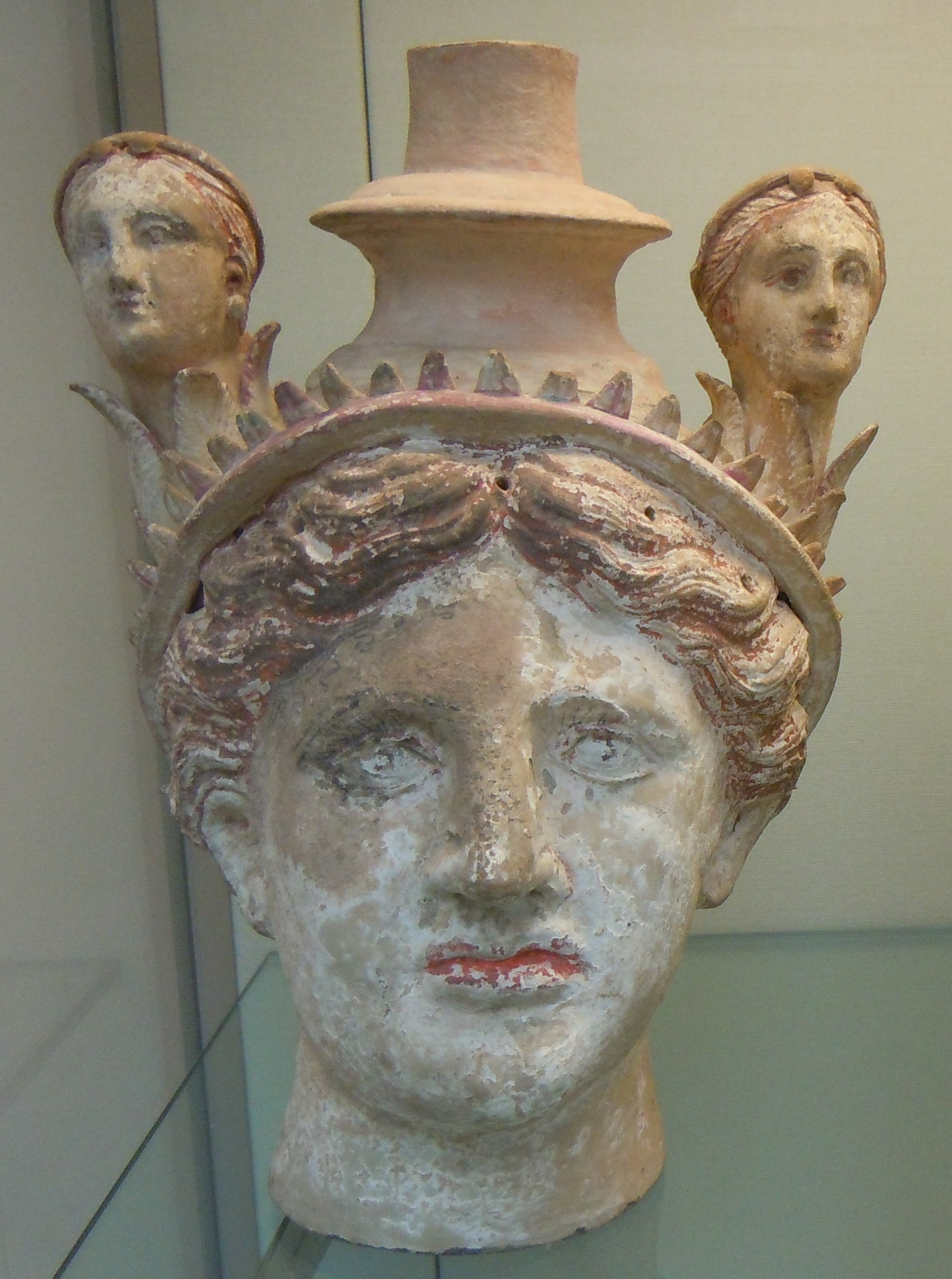
Female head partially imitating a vase (lekythos), 325-300 BC.

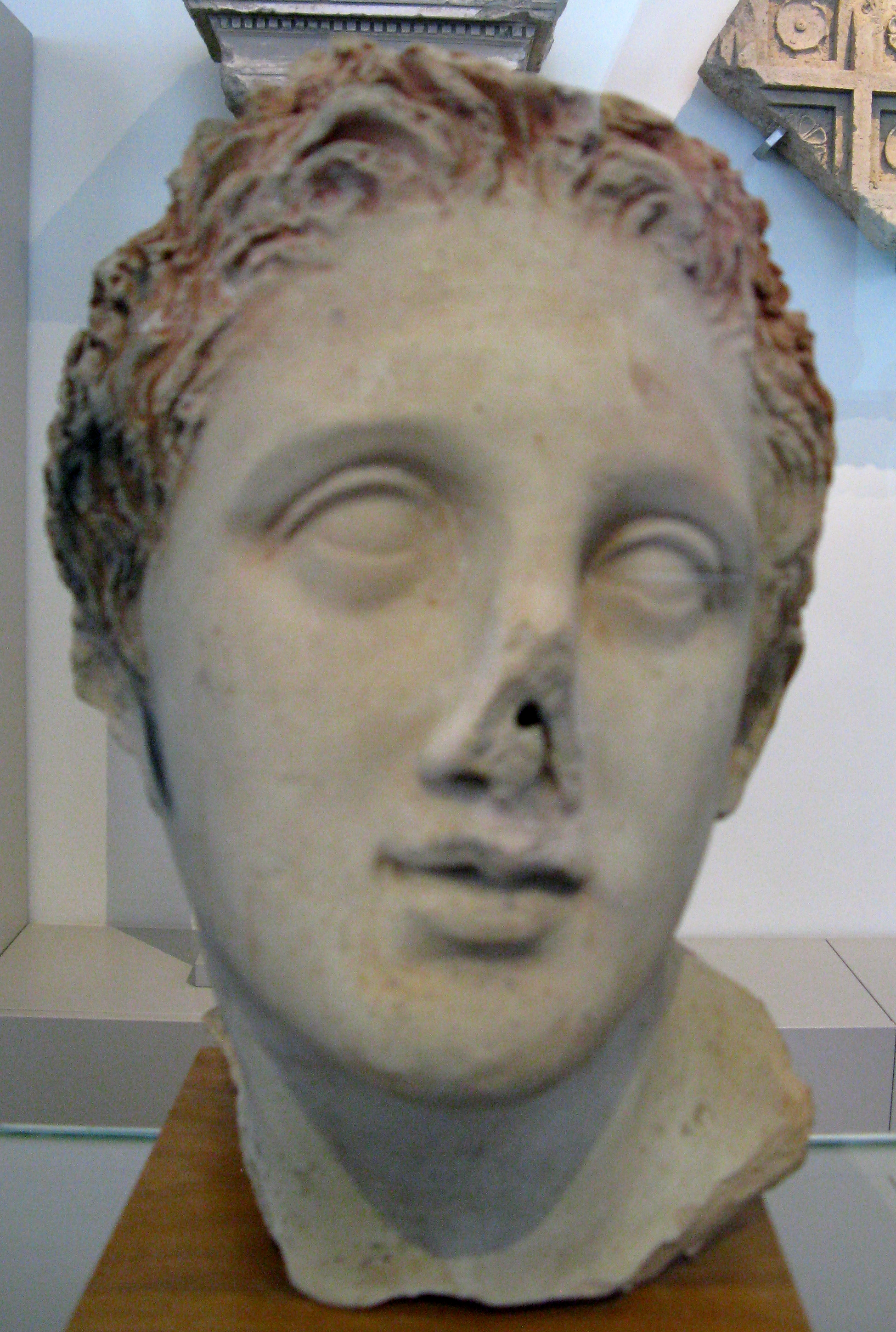
Ancient Greek terracotta head of a young man, found in Tarent, ca. 300 BC, Antikensammlung Berlin.

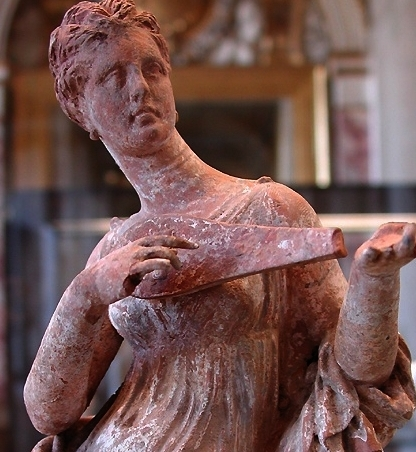
Tanagra figurine playing a pandura, 200 BC

== Minor arts ==
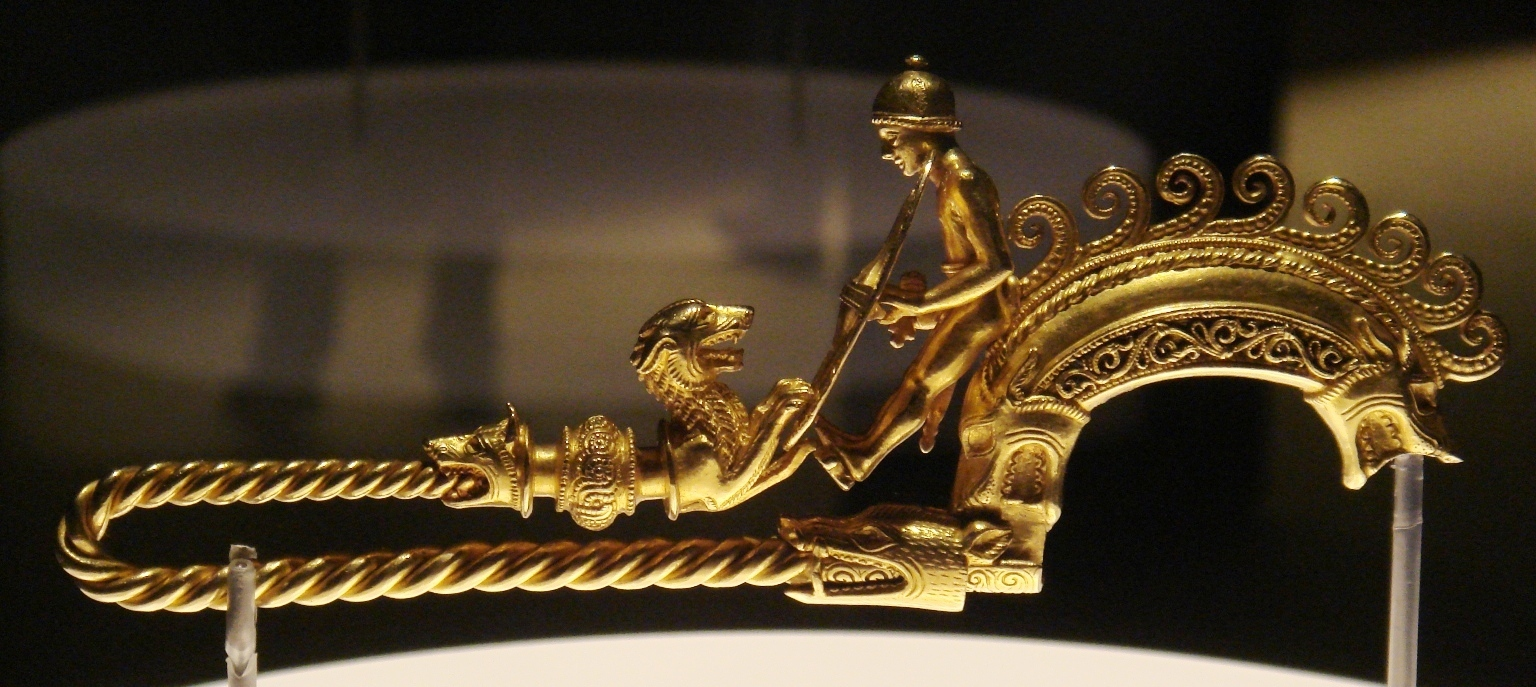
Braganza Brooch, ca. 250–200 BC. British Museum.

=== Metallic art ===
Because of so much bronze statue melting, only the smaller objects still exist. In Hellenistic Greece, the raw materials were plentiful following eastern conquests.

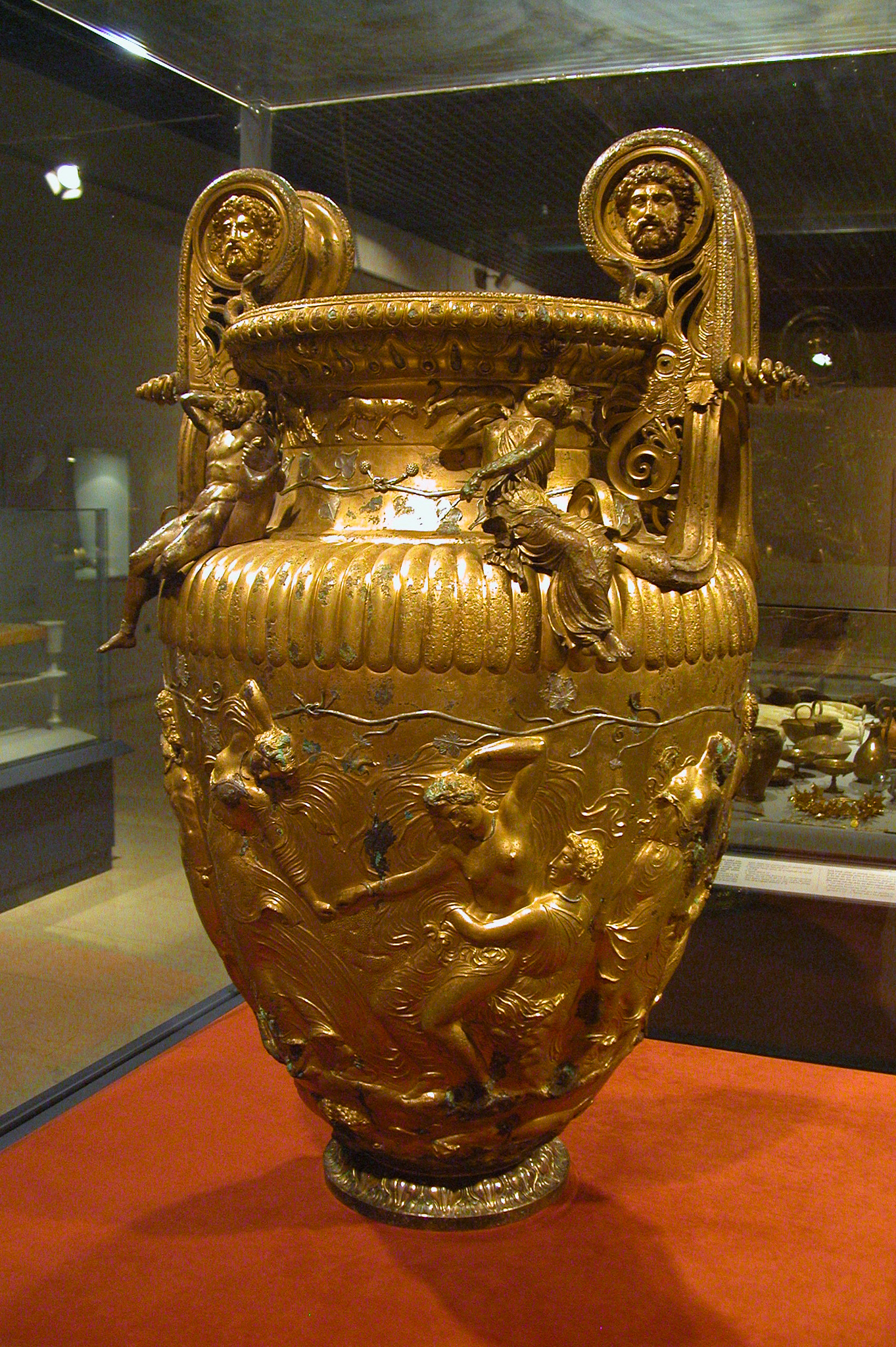
The Derveni Krater, 4th century BC, Archaeological Museum of Thessaloniki

The work on metal vases took on a new fullness: the artists competed among themselves with great virtuosity. The Thracian Panagyurishte Treasure (from modern Bulgaria), includes Greek objects such as a gold amphora with two rearing centaurs forming the handles.

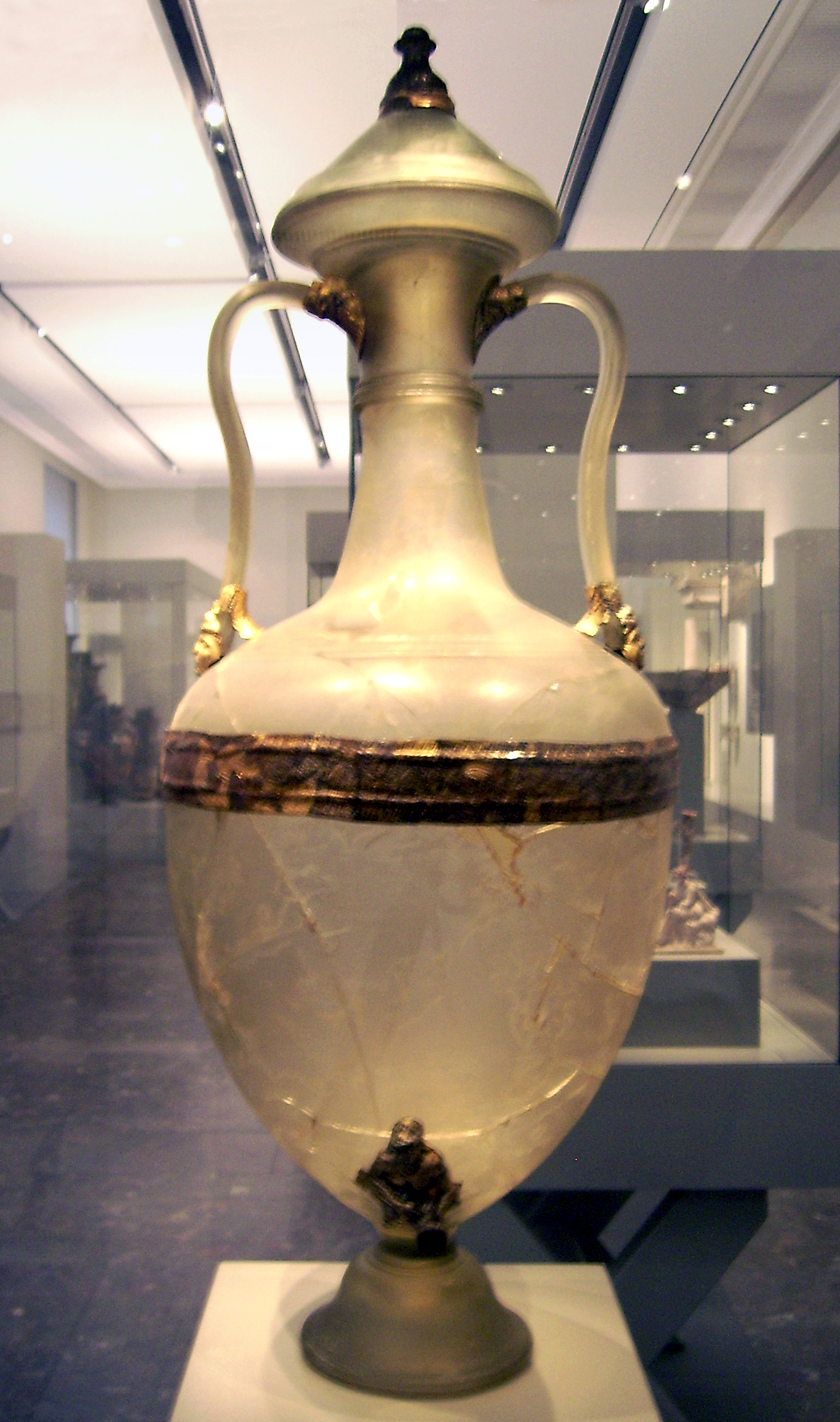
A Greek glass amphora, 2nd half of the 2nd century BC, from Olbia, Roman-era Sardinia, now in the Altes Museum

The Derveni Krater, from near Thessaloniki, is a large bronze volute krater from about 320 BC, weighing 40 kilograms, and finely decorated with a 32-centimetre-tall frieze of figures in relief representing Dionysus surrounded by Ariadne and her procession of satyrs and maenads. The neck is decorated with ornamental motifs while four satyrs in high relief are casually seated on the shoulders of the vase.

The evolution is similar for the art of jewelry. The jewelers of the time excelled at handling details and filigrees: thus, the funeral wreaths present very realistic leaves of trees or stalks of wheat. In this period the insetting of precious stones flourished.

=== Glass and glyptic art ===
It was in the Hellenistic period that the Greeks, who until then only knew molded glass, discovered the technique of glass blowing, thus permitting new forms. Beginning in Syria, the art of glass developed especially in Italy. Molded glass continued, notably in the creation of intaglio jewelry.

The art of engraving gems hardly advanced at all, limiting itself to mass-produced items that lacked originality. As compensation, the cameo made its appearance. It concerns cutting in relief on a stone composed of several colored layers, allowing the object to be presented in relief with more than one color. The Hellenistic period produced some masterpieces like the Gonzaga cameo, now in the Hermitage Museum, and spectacular hardstone carvings like the Cup of the Ptolemies in Paris.

=== Coinage ===
Coinage in the Hellenistic period increasingly used portraits.

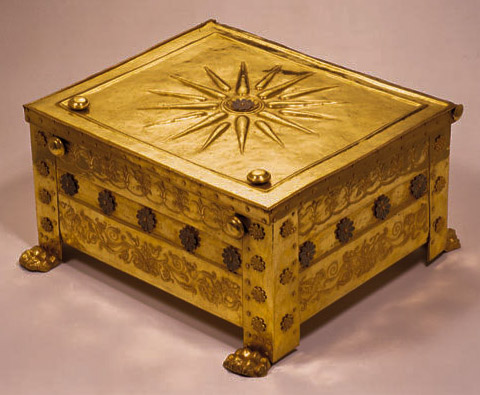
The golden larnax of Philip II of Macedon which contained his remains. It was constructed in 336 BC. It weighs 11 kilos and is made of 24 carat gold. Vergina, Greece.

The golden wreath of Philip II found inside the golden larnax. It weighs 717 grams.

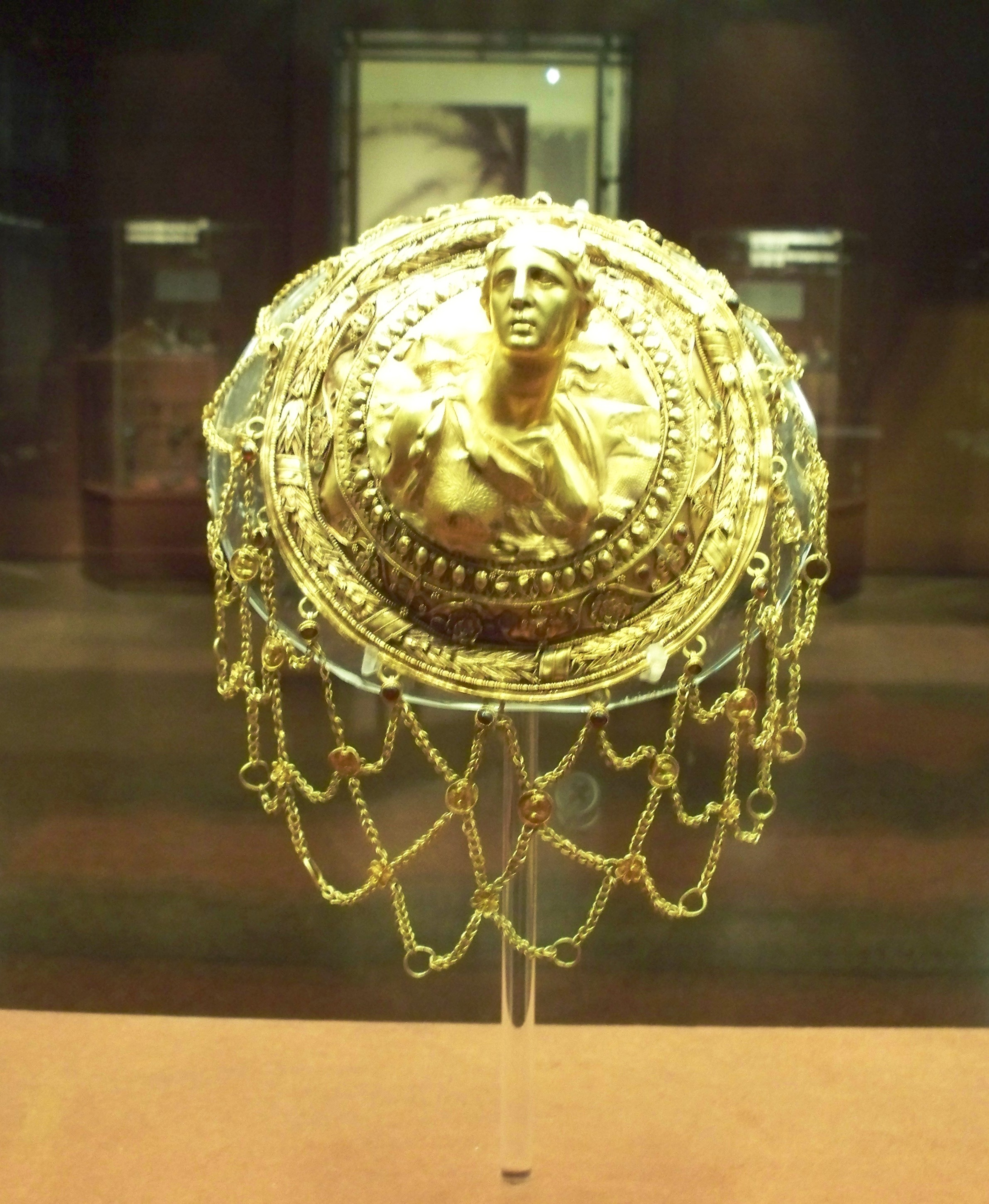
Golden jewelry to be worn as hair ornaments, 3rd century BC, Stathatos Collection, National Archaeological Museum of Athens.

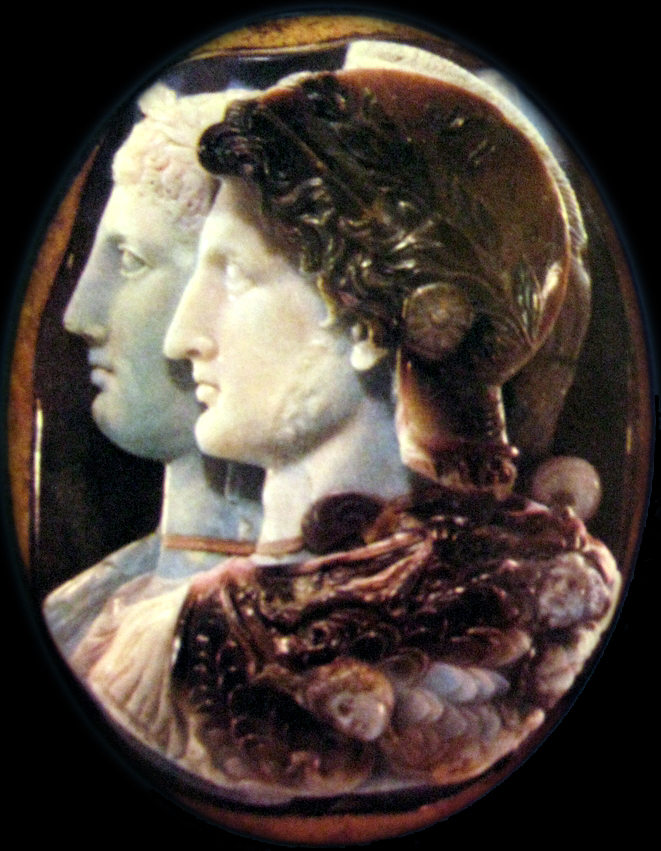
The Gonzaga Cameo 3rd century BC, in the Hermitage Museum, St. Petersburg

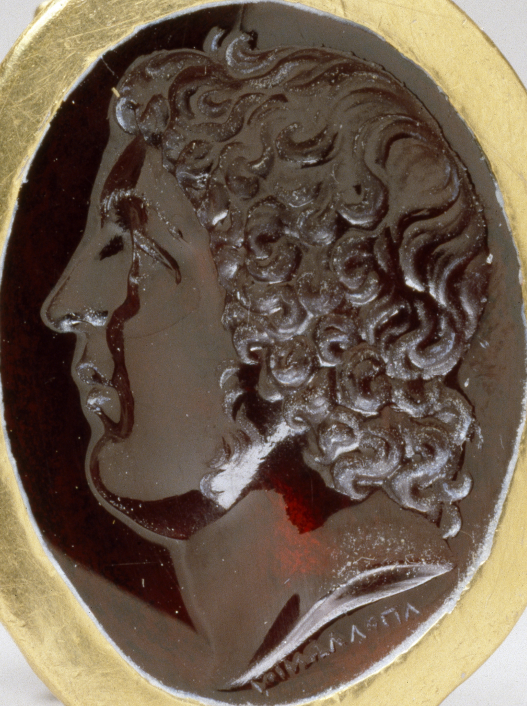
Apollonios of Athens, gold ring with portrait in garnet, c. 220 BC

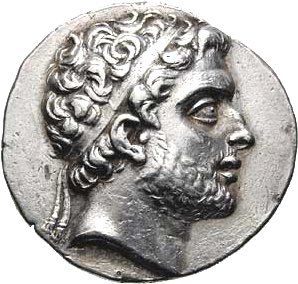
Philip V, "the darling of Hellas", wearing the royal diadem

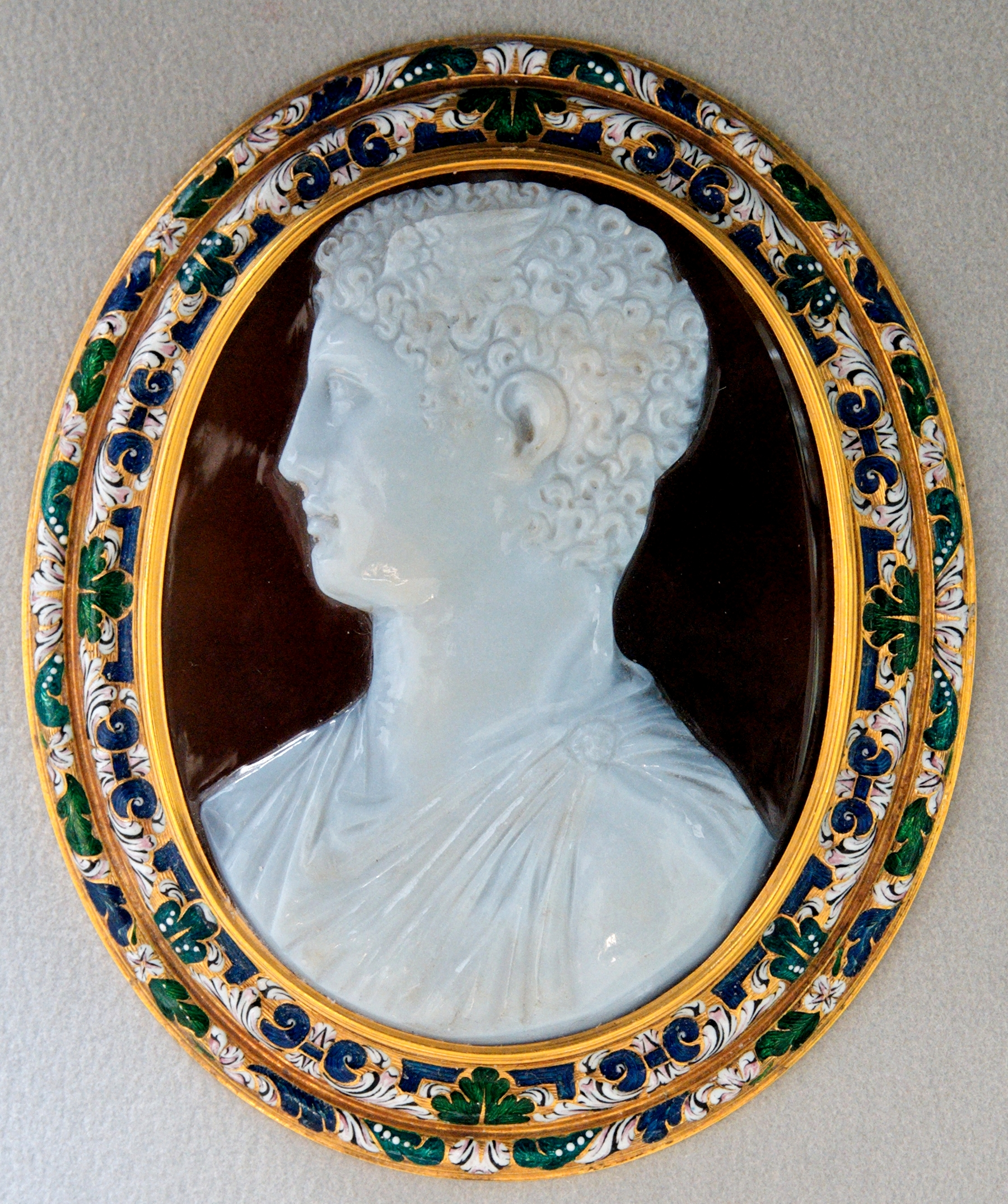
Sardonyx cameo of a Ptolemaic prince as the Greek god Hermes, Cabinet des médailles, Paris, 2nd century BC

== Later Roman copies ==
Spurred by the Roman acquisition, elite consumption and demand for Greek art, both Greek and Roman artists, particularly after the establishment of Roman Greece, sought to reproduce the marble and bronze artworks of the Classical and Hellenistic periods. They did so by creating molds of original sculptures, producing plaster casts that could be sent to any sculptor's workshop of the Mediterranean where these works of art could be duplicated. These were often faithful reproductions of originals, yet other times they fused several elements of various artworks into one group, or simply added Roman portraiture heads to preexisting athletic Greek bodies.

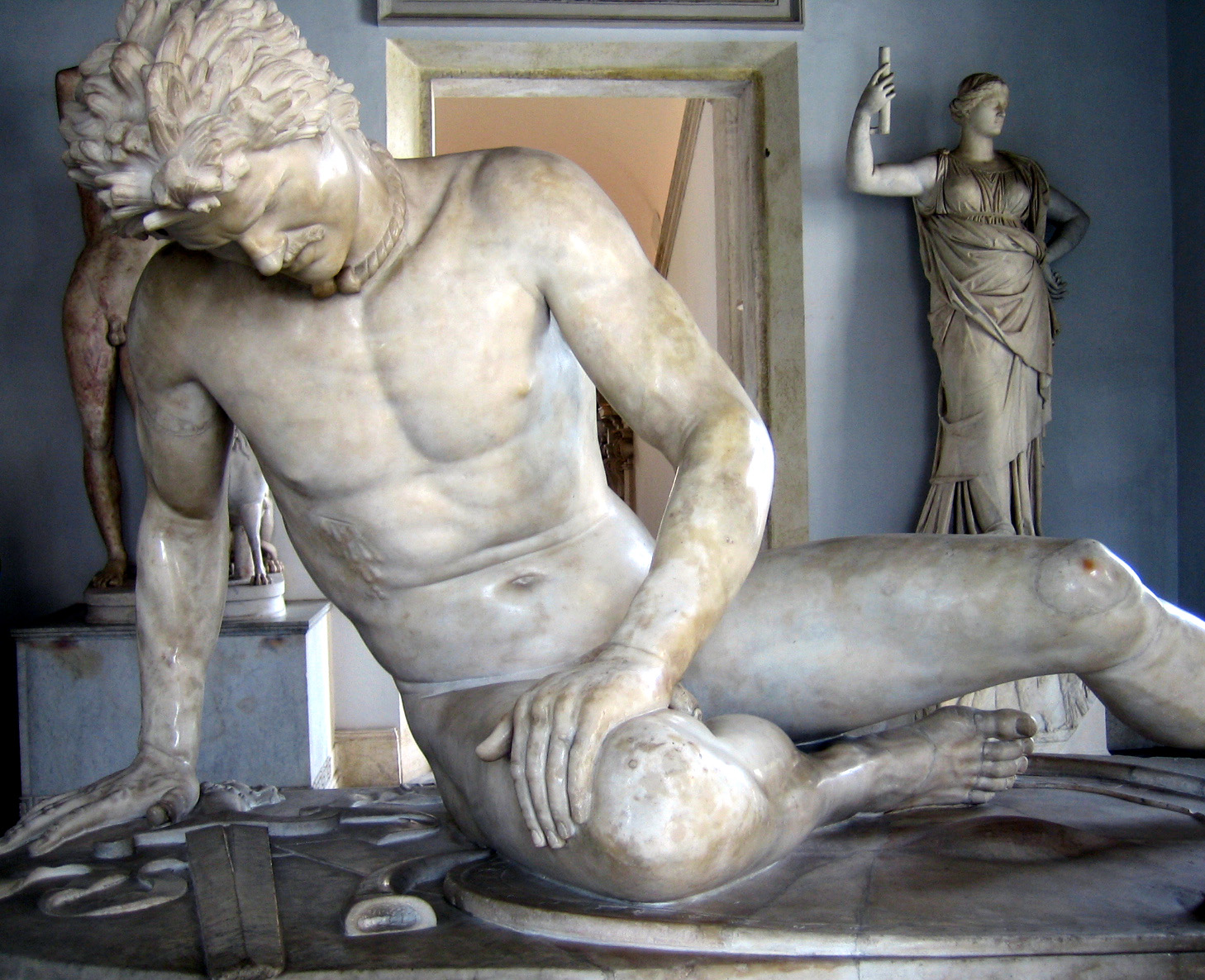
The Dying Gaul, a Roman marble copy of a Hellenistic work of the late third century BC Capitoline Museums, Rome.

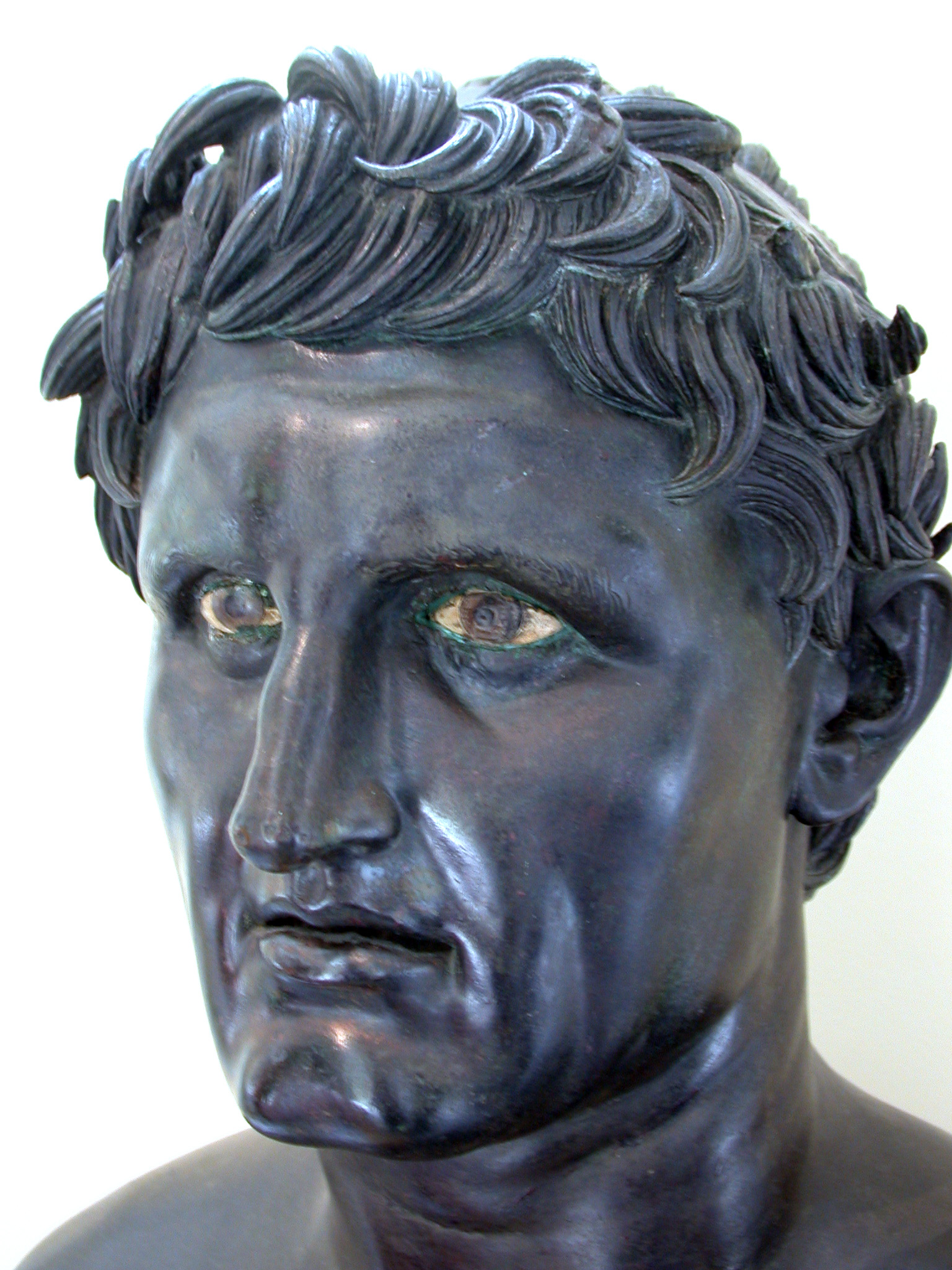
Roman copy of an original Hellenistic bust depicting Seleucus I Nicator (founder of the Seleucid Empire), found in Herculaneum, Italy

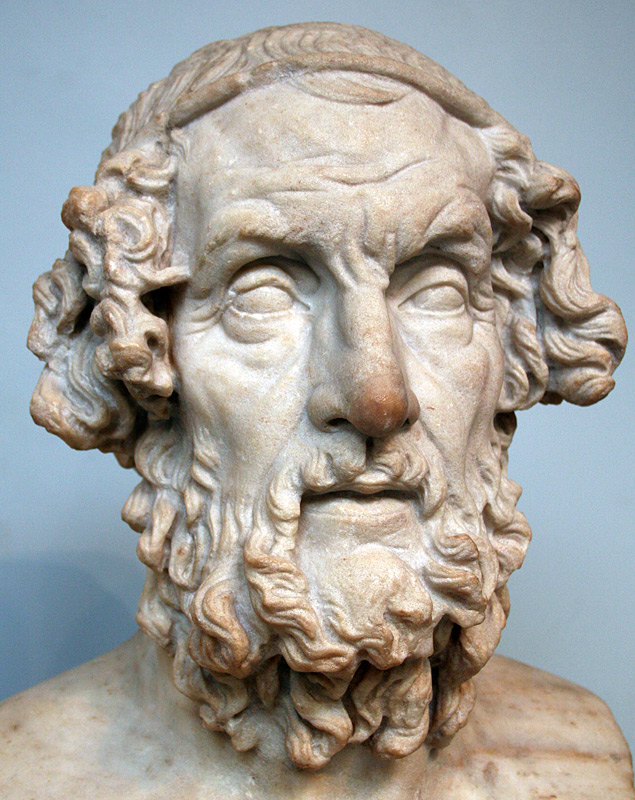
A Roman copy of a lost Hellenistic original (2nd century BC) depicting Homer, from Baiae, Italy, British Museum

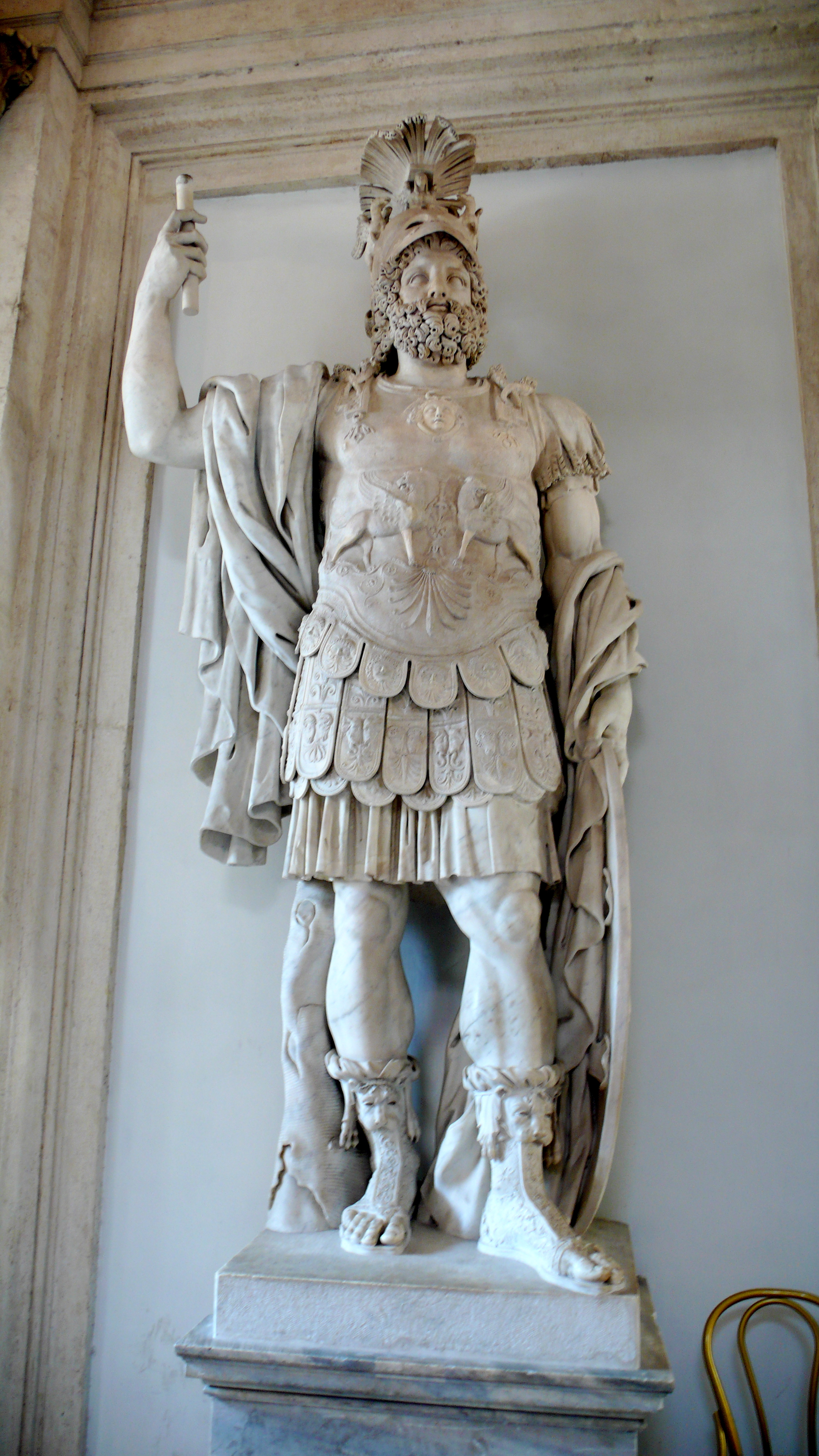
Statue of Mars from the Forum of Nerva, 2nd century AD, based on an Augustan-era original that in turn used a Hellenistic Greek model of the 4th century BC, Capitoline Museums

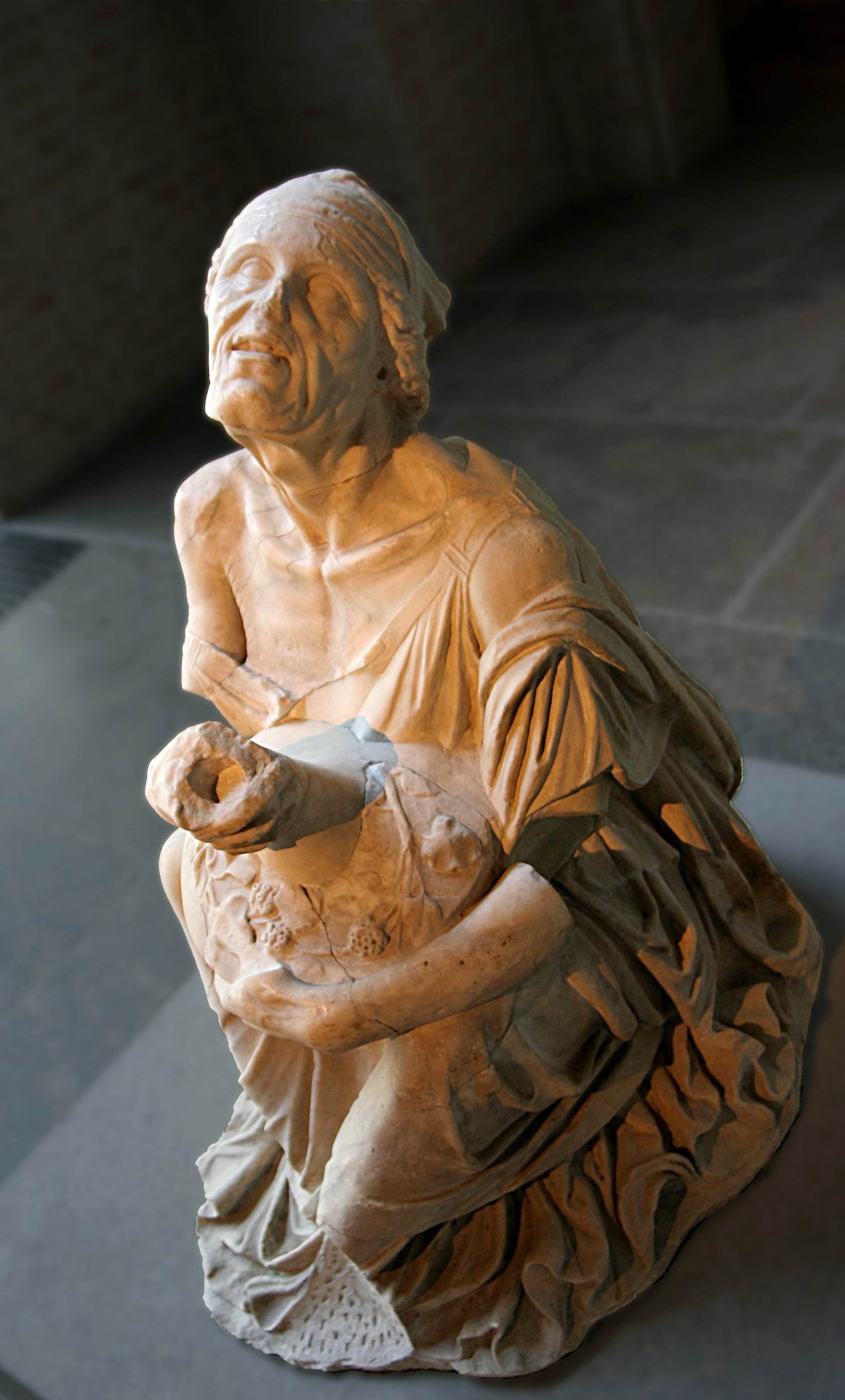
Drunken old woman clutching a lagynos. Marble, Roman copy after a Greek original of the 2nd century BC, credited to Myron.

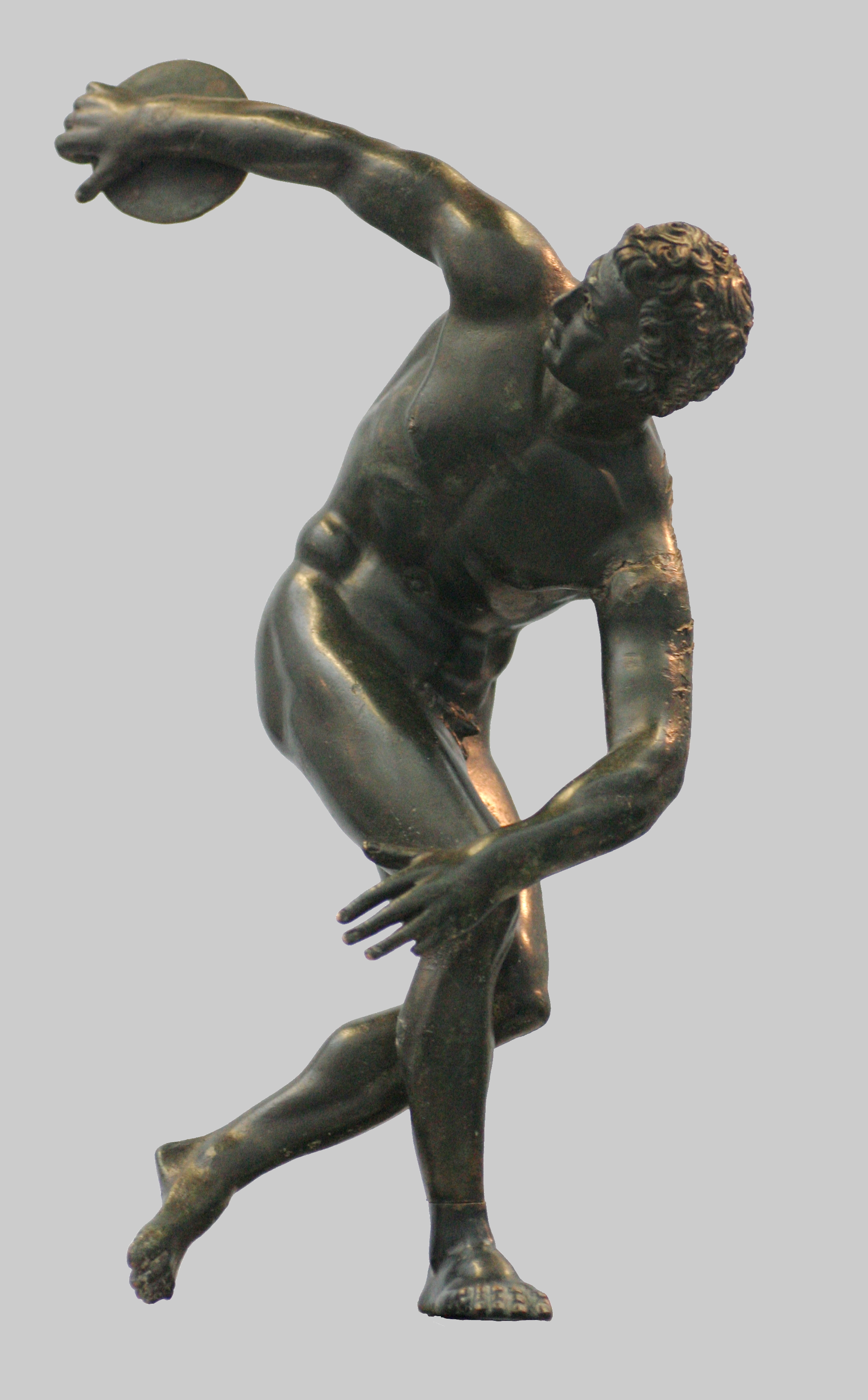
Roman bronze reduction of Myron's Discobolos, 2nd century AD

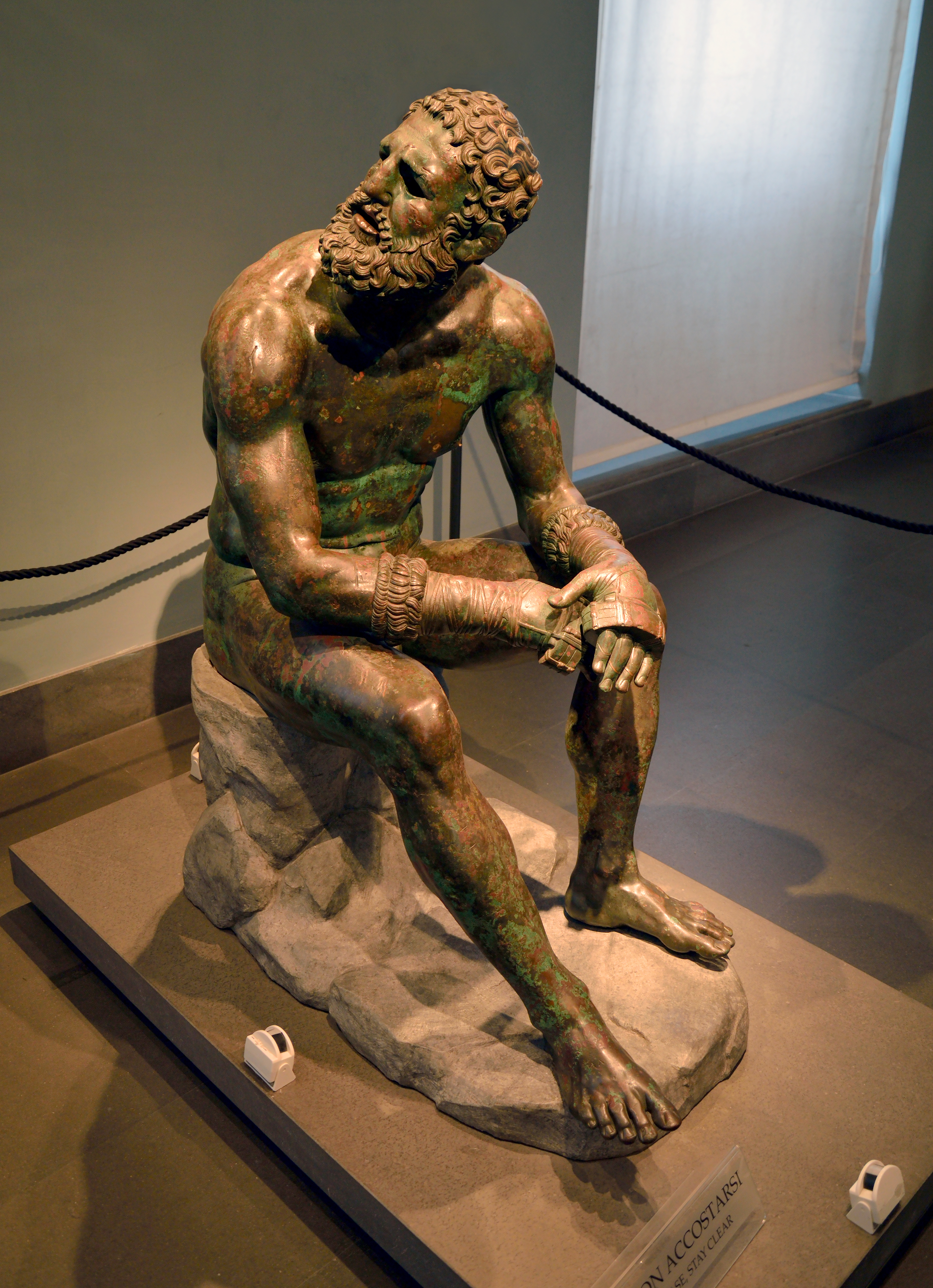
The Boxer of Quirinal, a Hellenistic sculpture in the National Museum of Rome.

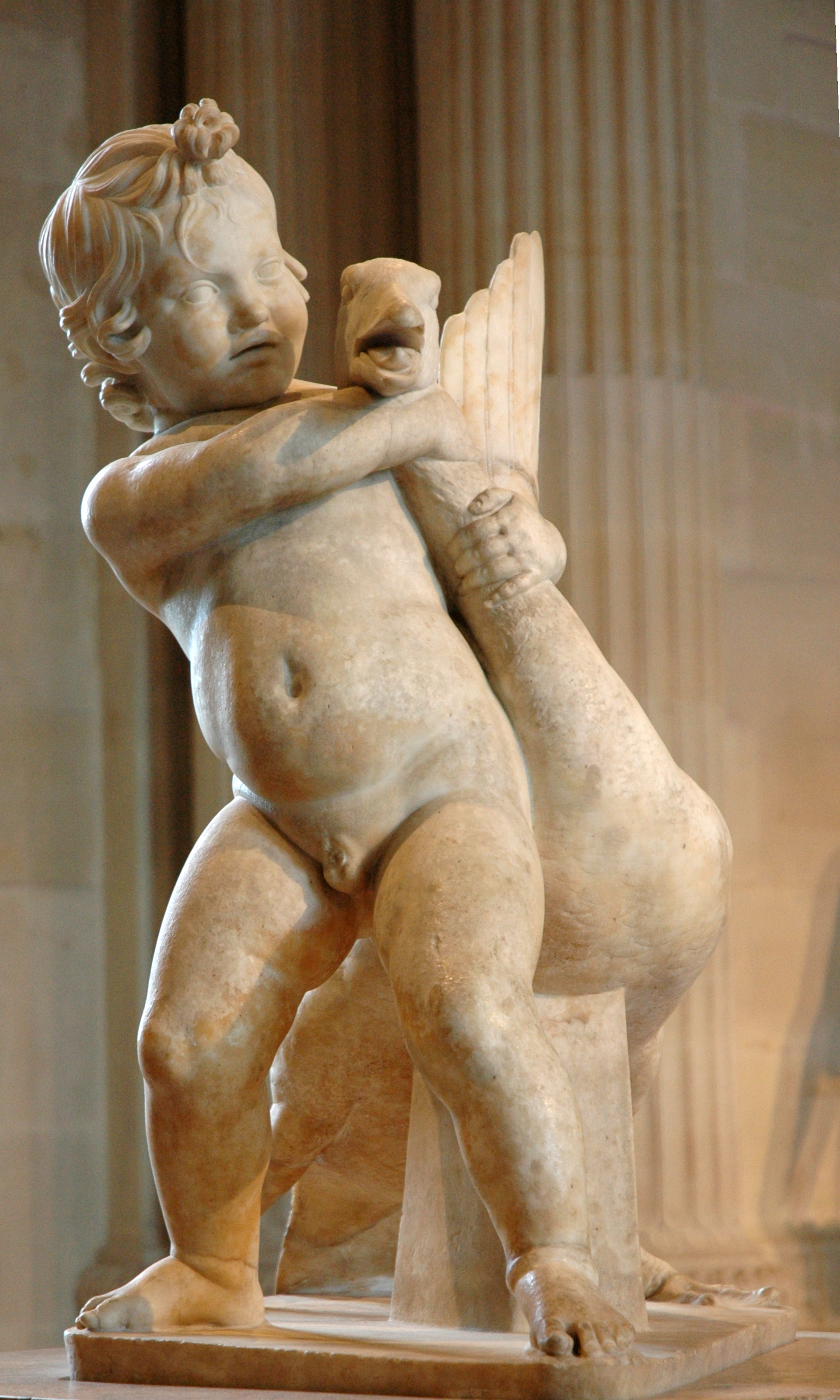
Child playing with a goose. Roman copy (1st–2nd centuries AD) of a Greek original, in the Louvre.

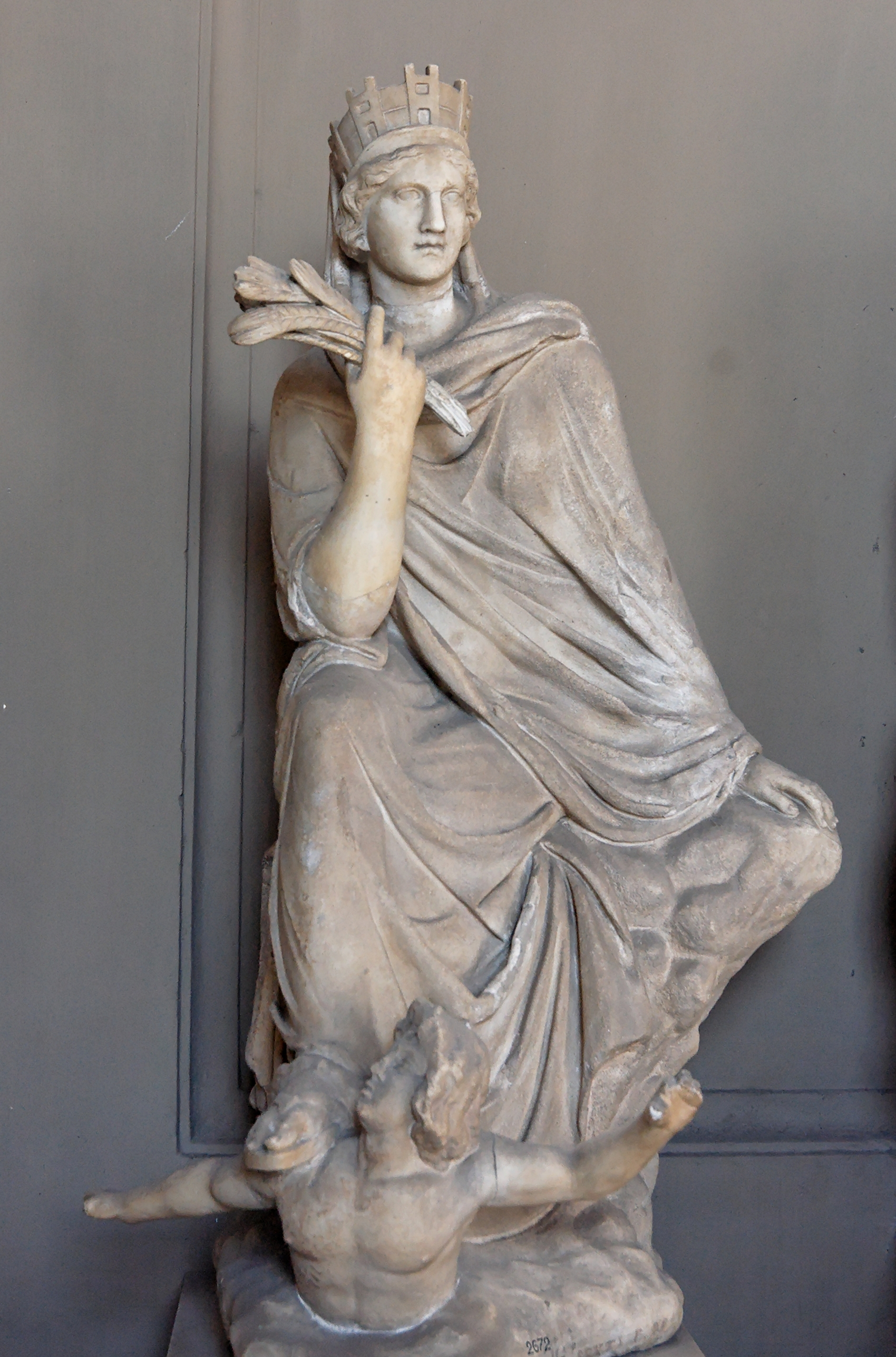
The Tyche of Antioch. Roman copy after a Greek bronze original by Eutychides of the 3rd century BC.

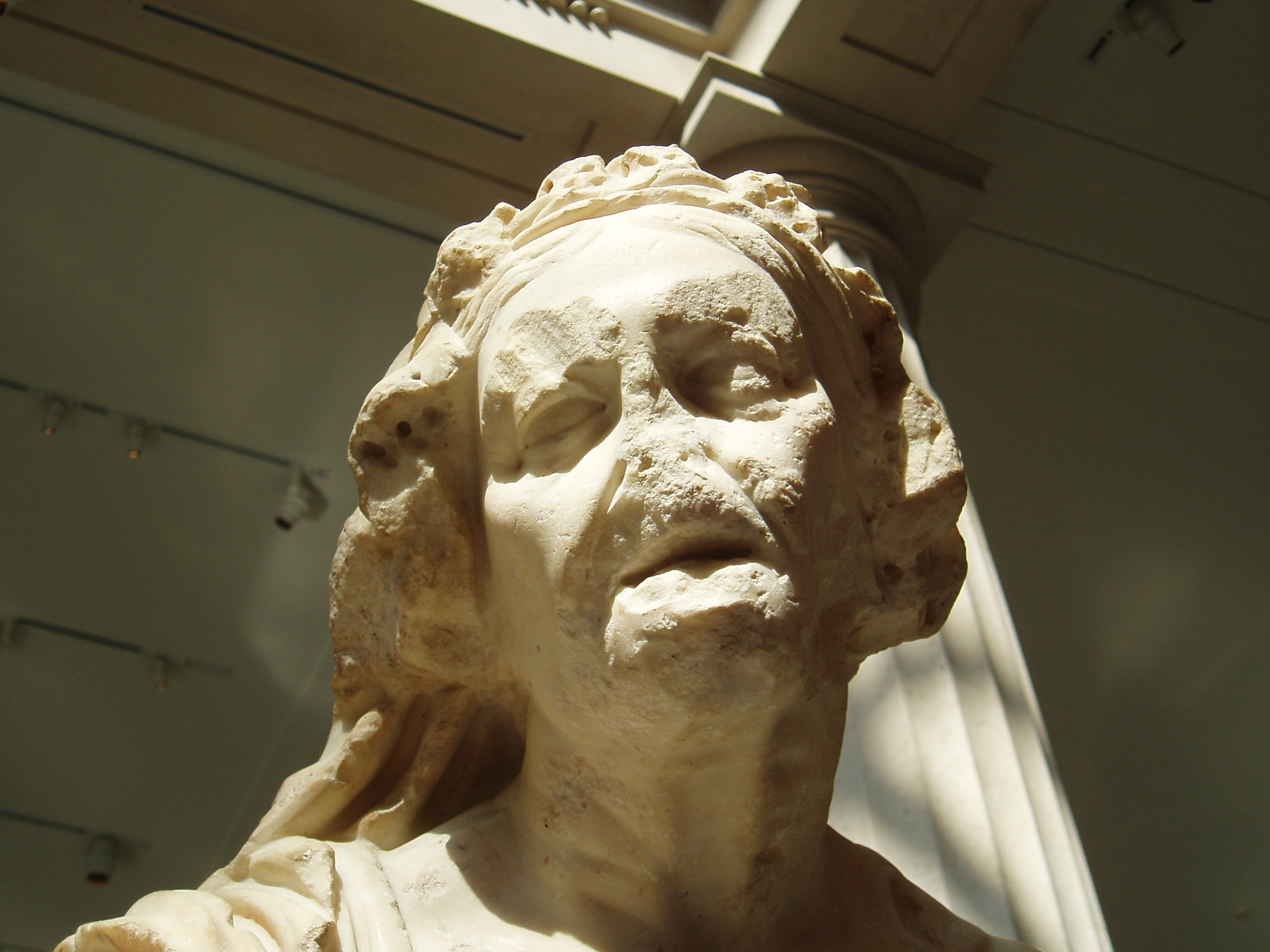
Old market woman, Roman artwork after a Hellenistic original of the 2nd century BC.

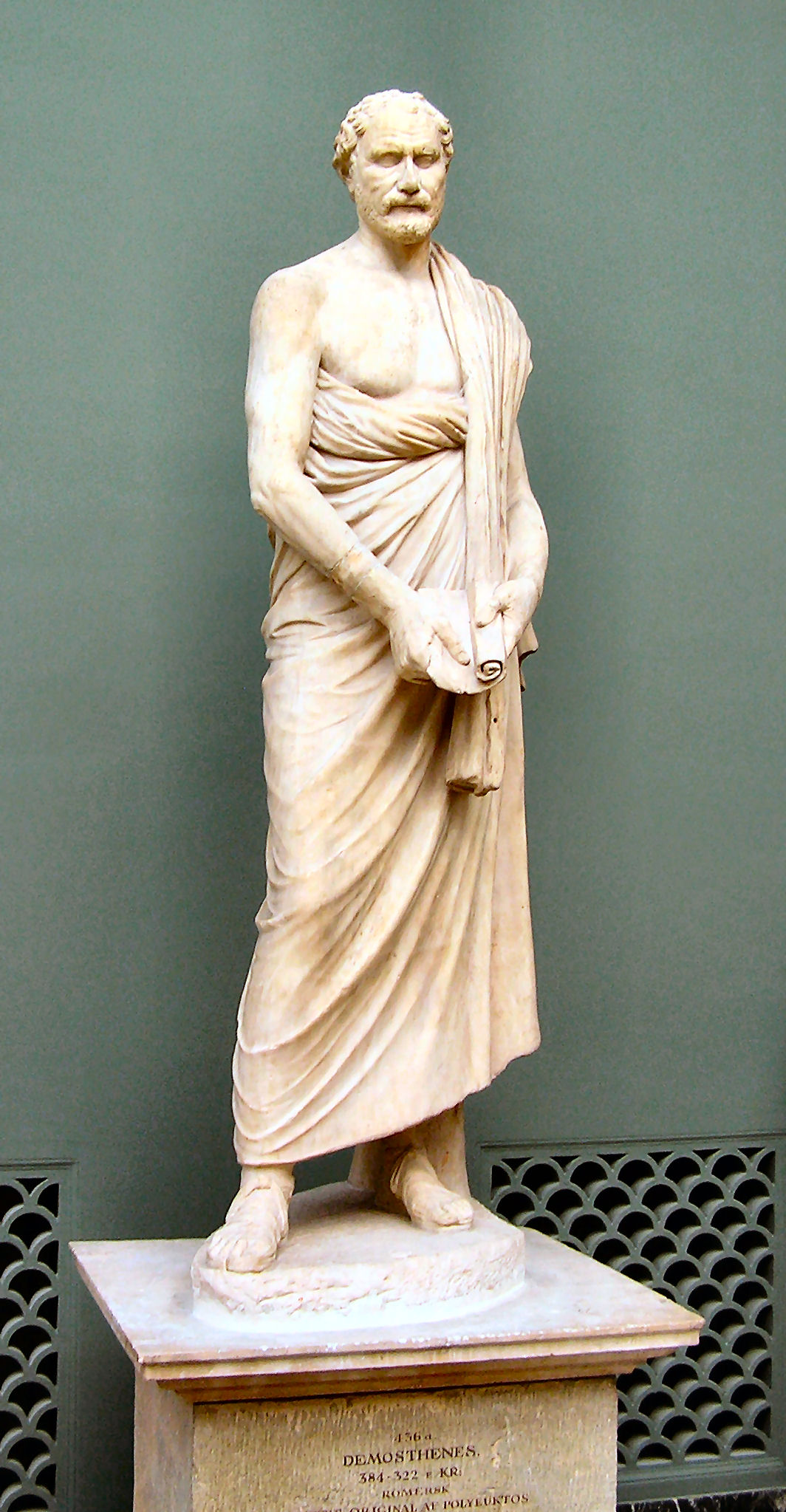
Demosthenes. Marble, Roman copy after an original by Polyeuktos (ca. 280).

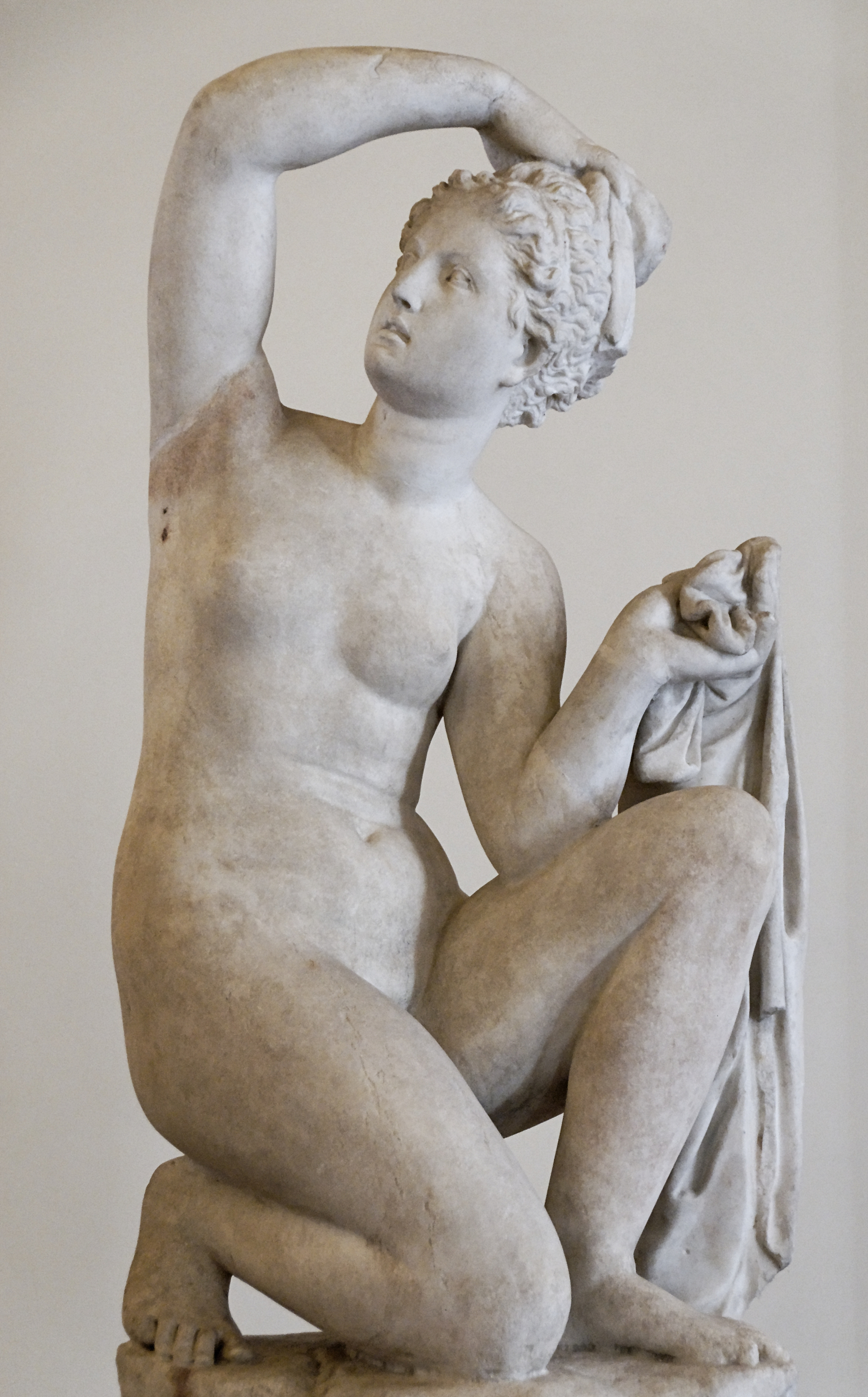
Crouching Aphrodite, marble copy from the 1st century BC after a Hellenistic original of the 3rd century BC.

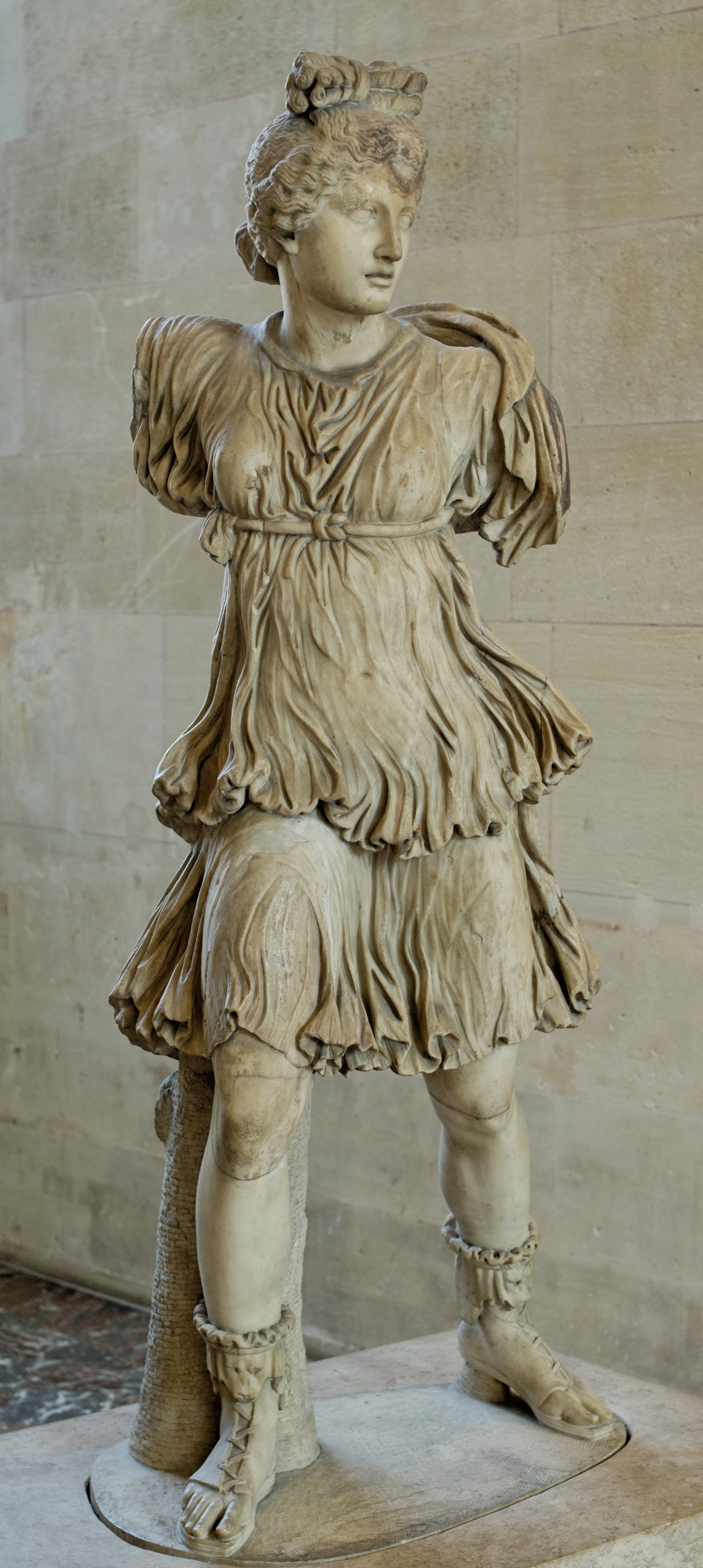
Artemis of the Rospigliosi type. Marble, Roman artwork of the Imperial Era, 1st–2nd centuries AD. Copy of a Greek original, Louvre

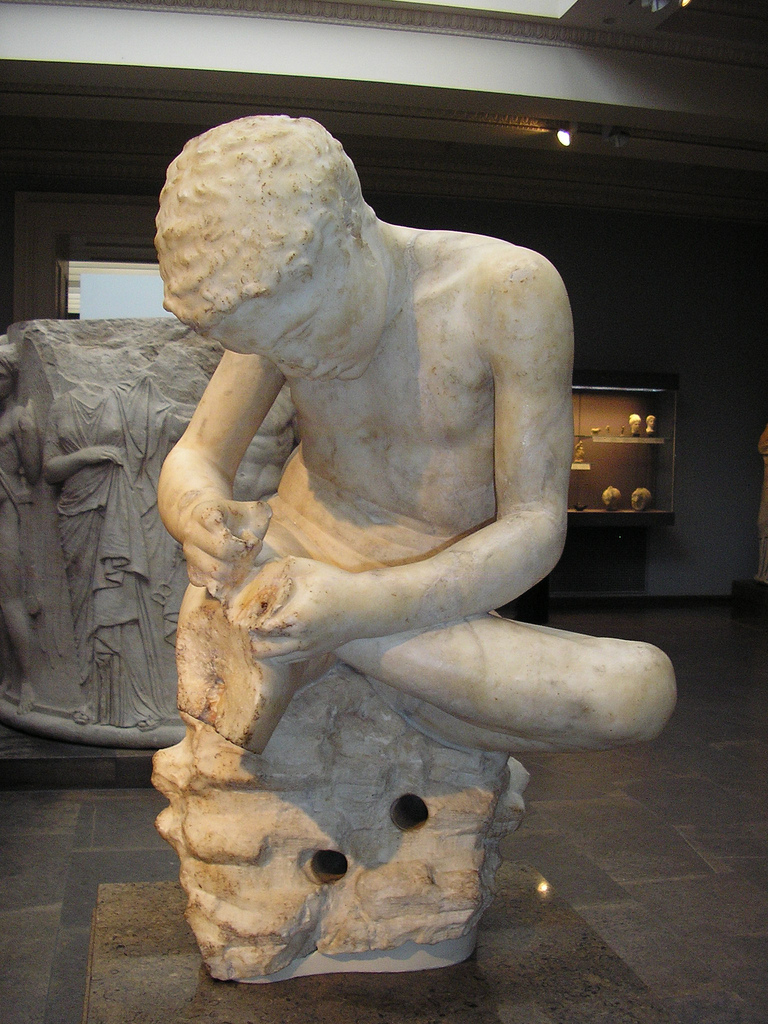
Roman marble copy of Boy with Thorn, c.25 - 50 CE,

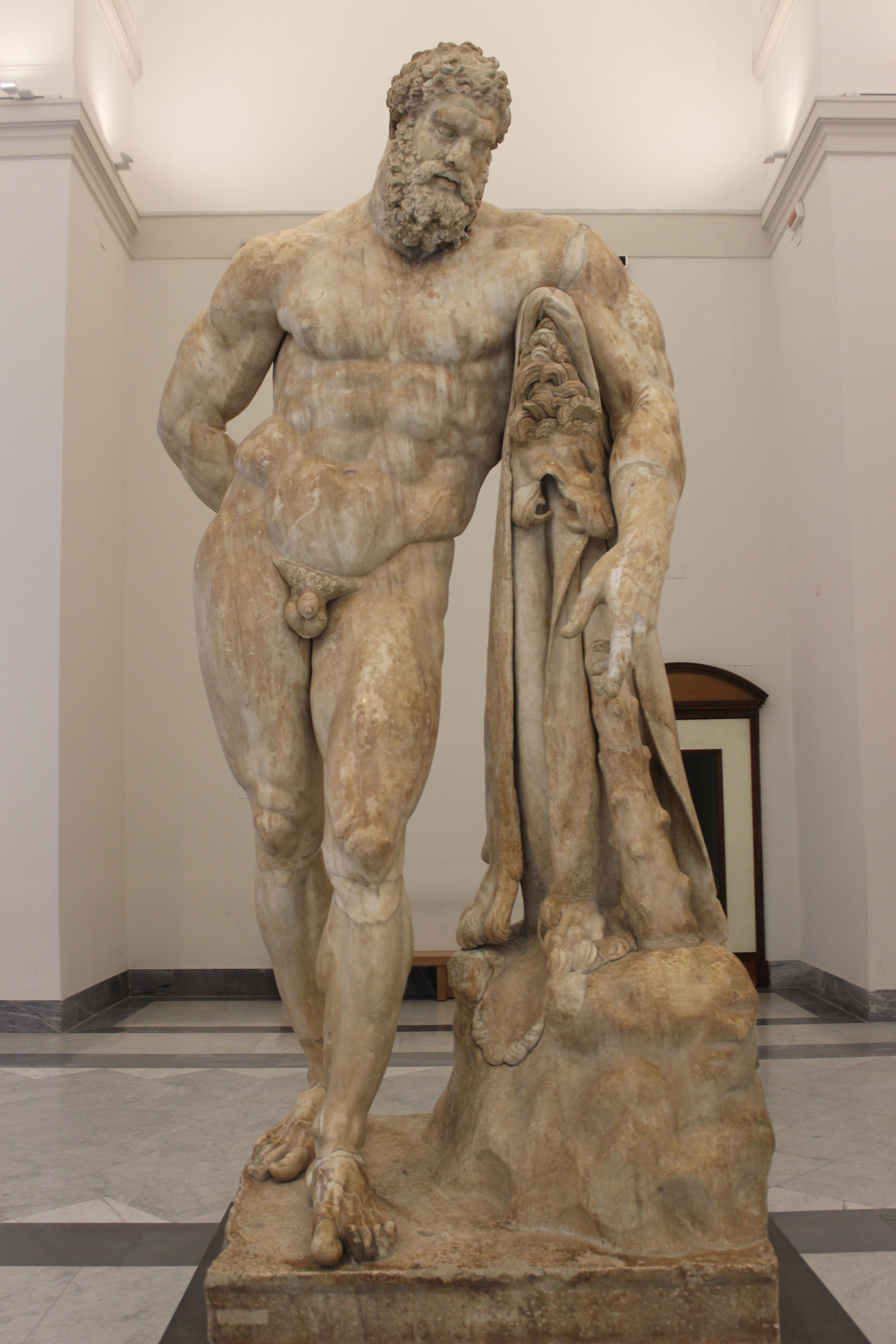
The Farnese Hercules, probably an enlarged copy made in the early 3rd century AD and signed by a certain Glykon, from an original by Lysippos (or one of his circle) that would have been made in the 4th century BC; the copy was made for the Baths of Caracalla in Rome (dedicated in 216 AD), where it was recovered in 1546

== See also ==
- Alexander the Great
- Hellenistic civilization
- Hellenistic Greece
- Hellenistic period
- Hellenistic sculpture
- Art in ancient Greece
- Pottery of Ancient Greece
- Ancient Greek vase painting
- Greek sculpture
- Hellenistic influence on Indian art
- Parthian art
- Bacchic art

== References and sources ==
Sources

- Anderson, William J. (1 June 1927). The Architecture of Ancient Greece. London: Harrison, Jehring, & Co. ISBN 978-0404147259.
- Boardman, John (1989). Greek Art. London: Thames and Hudson. ISBN 978-0-500-20292-0.
- Boardman, John (18 November 1993). The Oxford History of Classical Art. Oxford University Press. ISBN 0-19-814386-9.
- Bolman, Elizabeth S. (2016). "A Staggering Spectacle: Early Byzantine Aesthetics in the Triconch". In Bolman, Elizabeth S. (ed.). The Red Monastery Church: Beauty and Asceticism in Upper Egypt. New Haven & London: Yale University Press; American Research Center in Egypt, Inc. pp. 119–128. ISBN 978-0-300-21230-3.
- Bruno, Vincent L. (1985). Hellenistic Painting Techniques: The Evidence of the Delos Fragments. BRILL. ISBN 978-9004071599.
- Burn, Lucilla (2005). Hellenistic Art: From Alexander The Great To Augustus. Los Angeles: J. Paul Getty Trust Publications. ISBN 978-0-89236-776-4.
- Chamoux, Françios (2002) [1981]. Hellenistic Civilization. Translated by Michel Roussel. Oxford: Blackwell. ISBN 978-0631222422.
- Charbonneaux, Jean; Jean Martin; Roland Villard (1973). Hellenistic Greece. Translated by Peter Green. New York: Braziller. ISBN 978-0-8076-0666-7.
- Green, Peter (19 October 1993). Alexander to Actium: The Historical Evolution of the Hellenistic Age. ISBN 978-0520083493.
- Havelock, Christine Mitchell (1968). Hellenistic Art. Greenwich, Connecticut: New York Graphic Society Ltd. ISBN 978-0-393-95133-2.
- Holtzmann, Bernard and Alain Pasquier (2002). Histoire de l'art antique: l'art grec. Réunion des musées nationaux. ISBN 978-2-7118-3782-3.
- Honour, Hugh (2005). A World History of Art. Laurence King. ISBN 978-1856694513.
- Kleiner, Fred S. (2008). Gardner's Art Through the Ages: A Global History. Cengage Learning. ISBN 978-0-495-11549-6.
- Masseglia, Jane (2015). Body Language in Hellenistic Art and Society. Oxford University Press. ISBN 978-0198723592.
- Pedley, John Griffiths (2012). Greek Art and Archaeology. Prentice Hall. ISBN 978-0-205-00133-0.
- Pollitt, Jerome J. (1986). Art in the Hellenistic Age. Cambridge University Press. ISBN 978-0-521-27672-6.
- Richter, Gisela M. A. (1970). The Sculpture and Sculptors of the Greeks.
- Singleton, Esther (1910). Famous sculpture as seen and described by great writers. Dodd, Mead & Company.
- Stewart, Andrew (2014). Art in the Hellenistic World: An Introduction. Cambridge University Press. ISBN 978-1-107-62592-1.
- Winter, Frederick (2006). Studies in Hellenistic Architecture. University of Toronto Press. ISBN 978-0802039149.
- Zanker, Graham (2004). Modes of Viewing in Hellenistic Poetry and Art. University of Wisconsin Press. ISBN 978-0299194505.
