= Sacrifice in ancient Roman religion =

Roman religious practice

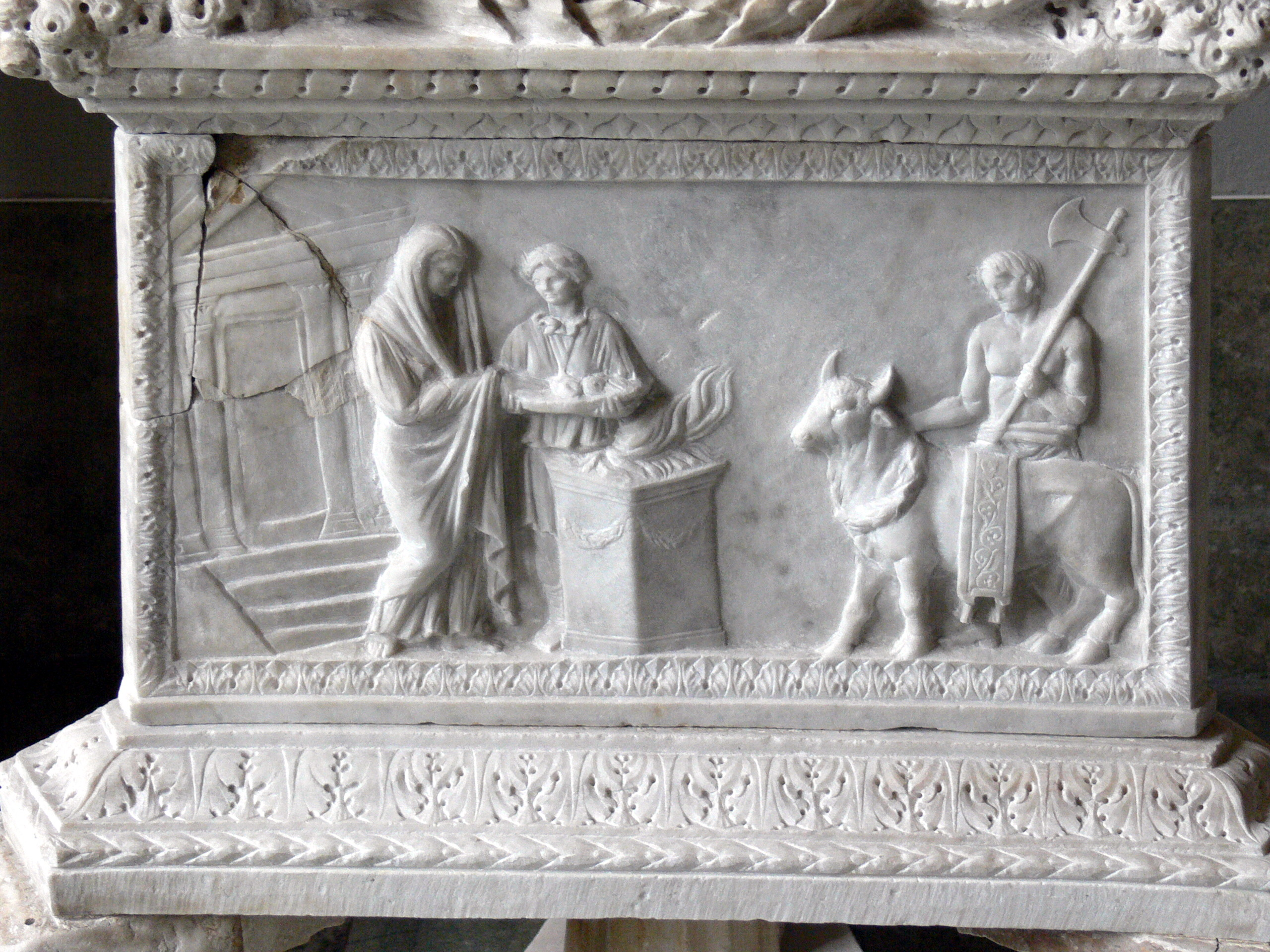
Roman relief depicting a scene of sacrifice, with libations at a flaming altar and the victimarius carrying the sacrificial axe

In Latin, the word sacrificium means the performance of an act that renders something sacer, sacred. Sacrifice reinforced the powers and attributes of divine beings and inclined them to render benefits in return (the principle of do ut des).

== Hierarchy of being ==
Roman sacrificial rites were heavily associated with hierarchy; they reinforced both the social hierarchy of Roman society, and also the divine hierarchy between gods and mortals in Roman religion. The scholar of Roman religion John Scheid argues that the Romans viewed sacrifice as an expression pious submission towards the deities, as demonstrated by the origin myth of the Vinalia. According to Cato the Elder, a 3rd-2nd century BCE Roman politician and writer, the tyrant king Mezentius commanded the Rutuli to give unto him all the first fruits that were usually offered to the gods, prompting the Latins—who feared they would be subjected to the same demand—to sacrifice all their wine to Jupiter in exchange for divine favor. Macrobius, a 5th-century Roman author, explicitly describes the piety of this action in his commentary on the 1st-century BCE poet Virgil's rendition of this tale, writing that "He puts all piety in the sacrifices one has to present to the gods, to the point that for the contrary reason, he treats Mezentius as a despiser of the gods ("contemptor deorum") because he claimed divine honors for himself."

The Roman sacrifice was, at its core, the act of sharing food between the gods and mortals. Following the sacrifice of an animal, if its entrails (exta) were deemed auspicious by the haruspex, the animal was butchered, with some parts later dedicated to the gods and others eaten by the human suppliants. The differentiation between the food offered to the divine and the food available to the participants represented the division between these groups, which itself highlighted the superiority of the former and the inferiority of the latter. According to the archaeologist Candace Weddle, the Greeks and the Romans envisioned their gods not as physically digesting food the way a human must, bust instead as enjoying the smoke of burnt offerings through smell, or perhaps through an abstract divine sense comparable to human olfaction. Therefore, in Roman sacrifices, though a communal meal between gods and mortals, these groups remained separated through sensory experience, thereby emphasizing the barrier between the divine and humans.

The hierarchy of being was conveyed through the topography of religious rituals and sites. For instance, in the Epulum Iovis, a sacrificial banquet dedicated to Jupiter, the senatorial class was permitted to dine atop the Capitoline Hill, in contrast to the plebeians who dwelt below by the Forum. Similarly, the Temple of Dea Dia includes, at its highest point, a grove that contained the altar of Dea Dia herself, with altars dedicated to lesser divinities located at a lower elevation. The Caesareum, a temple for the deified emperors (Divi), was situated even further down the hill. It was in this same Caesareum that the Arval brotherhood, who were forbidden from eating inside the grove, performed their sacrificial banquets. The Acta Arvalia record separate rules for animal sacrifices depending upon the status of the recipient. In one section of the Acts, sacrifices of two animals are offered to all the gods and goddesses, with the exception of the Divi who only receive one. Furthermore, the Divi appear at the end of the list, following all the other deities, including even minor entities such as Adolenda or Deferunda. According to Scheid, these particular instructions for the sacrifice probably reflect a Roman belief that the Divi were of a lower rank compared to the other gods.

According to the classicist J. B. Rives, animal sacrifices were likely confined to a small subset of the Roman population, as only the wealthy could either purchase the requisite animals or to own a large enough supply of livestock that some could be set aside for sacrifice. Thus, engagement in an animal sacrifice demonstrated not just the piety of the suppliant, but also their social standing and affluence. Even amongst those capable of affording animal sacrifice, there would have been a hierarchy based upon the choice of victim. Animals such as piglets or lambs were easily accessible, and consequently among the least prestigious victims, whereas bovines were much less widely available, and therefore more valuable as sacrificial victims. Uncastrated male bulls were the ideal sacrificial beast, with the 1st-century CE writer Pliny the Elder explicitly referring to the animals as "the choicest victims and the most sumptuous appeasement of the gods." Their value was likely predicated upon their exclusivity: Bulls would only have been left uncastrated for the purpose of animal breeding, which was itself largely reserved for the upper-class in Rome. Otherwise, the majority of bulls were castrated so as to more easily facilitate their role as domestic farm animals. Ideally, sacrificial animals would be unblemished and in perfect condition, perhaps even satisfying further requirements regarding their sex, species, color, and fertility depending upon the ritual. It would have been far easier for the wealthy to satisfy these requirements, as besides having access to more animals in general—and therefore more rare or unusual animals—they were also more capable of setting aside some of their livestock to be raised specifically for sacrifice.

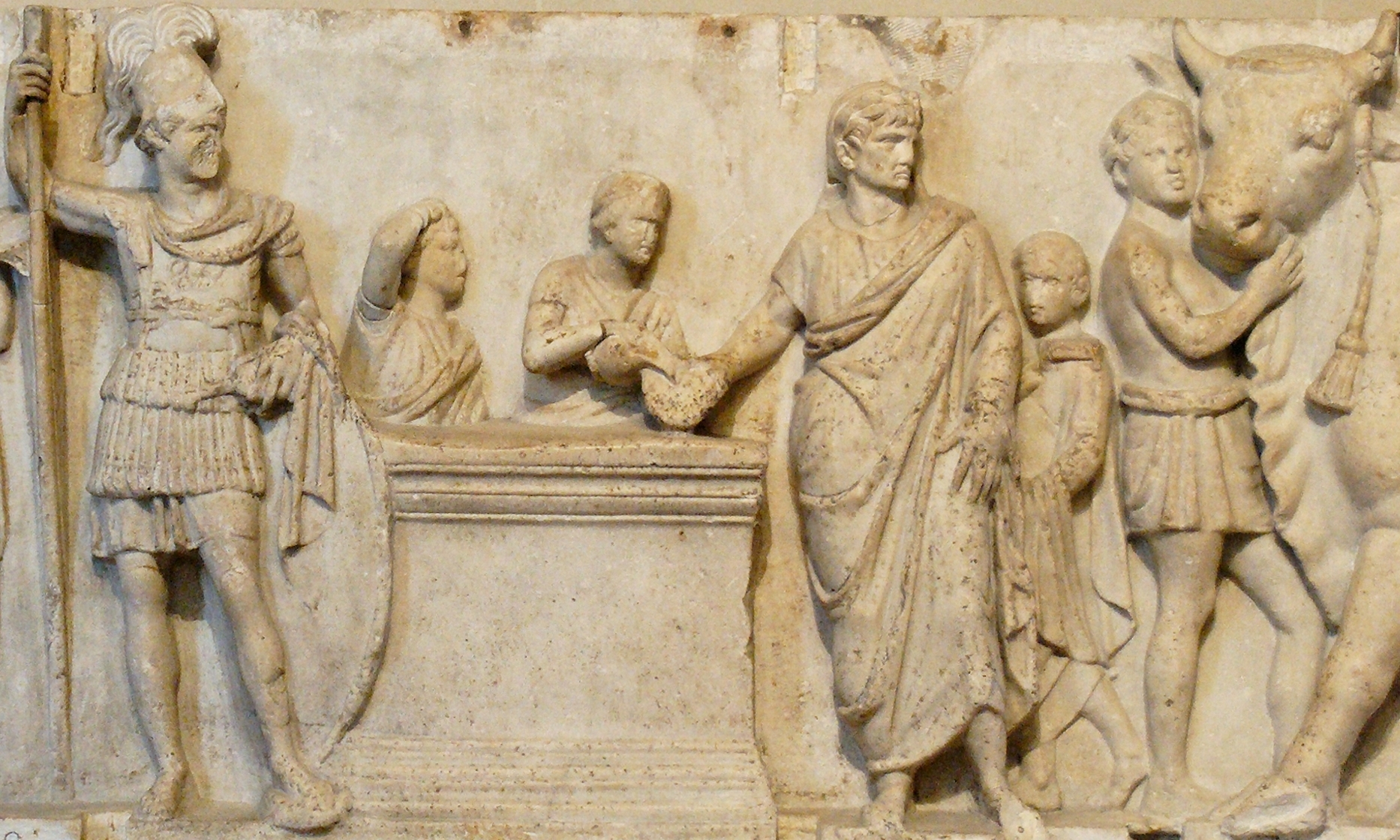
Sacrificial scene from the Altar of Domitius Ahenobarbus

The ritual of animal sacrifice itself involved numerous separate individuals belonging various different social strata. Upper-class individuals fulfilled tasks more tangential to the specific act of killing the animal, such as chanting or offering pieces of flesh or blood at the altar. The performance of the sacrifice itself was left to the victimarii, popae, and cultrarii, all of whom were either slaves or other low-class persons. That low-class individuals were responsible for the sacrificial act may explain the relative paucity of detail in Roman sources regarding the specific procedures utilized to accomplish the killing of the animal. Rives argues that magistrates and religious officials, at least sometimes, chose to depict themselves as sacrificants so as to commemorate their role in public office, though the evidence is too scant to determine how widespread such a practice was. In support of his argument, Rives cites the Altar of Domitius Ahenobarbus, which a sacrifice associated with either the establishment of a Roman colony or a lustration ritual following the completion of a census. In any case, the sacrificant is a public official, either one of the individuals responsible for the founding of the colony or one of the censors.

== Motives ==
A sacrifice might be made in thanksgiving or as an expiation of a sacrilege or potential sacrilege (piaculum); a piaculum might also be offered as a sort of advance payment; the Arval Brethren, for instance, offered a piaculum before entering their sacred grove with an iron implement, which was forbidden, as well as after. The pig was a common victim for a piaculum.

Extraordinary circumstances called for extraordinary sacrifice: in one of the many crises of the Second Punic War, Jupiter Capitolinus was promised every animal born that spring (see ver sacrum), to be rendered after five more years of protection from Hannibal and his allies. The "contract" with Jupiter is exceptionally detailed. All due care would be taken of the animals. If any died or were stolen before the scheduled sacrifice, they would count as already sacrificed, since they had already been consecrated. Normally, if the gods failed to keep their side of the bargain, the offered sacrifice would be withheld. In the imperial period, sacrifice was withheld following Trajan's death because the gods had not kept the emperor safe for the stipulated period.

The same divine agencies who caused disease or harm also had the power to avert it, and so might be placated in advance. Divine consideration might be sought to avoid the inconvenient delays of a journey, or encounters with banditry, piracy and shipwreck, with due gratitude to be rendered on safe arrival or return. In times of great crisis, the Senate could decree collective public rites, in which Rome's citizens, including women and children, moved in procession from one temple to the next, supplicating the gods.

== Animal sacrifice ==
=== Characteristics of a sacrificial animal ===
==== Color ====
It is traditionally thought that black animals were sacrificed to chthonic underworld gods, and white animals were offered to 'Olympian' gods associated with sky. However, the information concerning the required characteristics of a sacrificial animal in ancient Rome largely derives from authors of Late Antiquity, particularly Servius, a 4th or 5th century Roman grammarian, and Arnobius, a 3rd-century CE writer. The works of these later writers are not necessarily reliable: According to the classicist Gunnel Ekroth, the "lexicographers and grammarians of late antiquity" more likely provided "armchair speculations" rather than "the sacrificial reality of earlier periods." Servius, in his commentaries on the Georgics, claims that animals were sacrificed to the gods on account of their similarity ("per similitudinem") or their opposition ("per contrarietatem") to the characteristics of the recipient god. It is, according to Servius, on account of the former principle, that a sacrifice to Pluto of black cattle ("nigrum pecus") is conducted. Furthermore, Arnobius writes that the "cheerfulness of white" ("hilaritate candoris") renders it "acceptable" ("acceptus") and "propitious" ("felix") for the "gods above" ("superis diis") and those who "give favorable omens" ("ominumdexteritate pollentibus").

There is some evidence for sacrifices adhering to these color-based rules in Classical Antiquity: Lucretius, a 1st-century BCE Roman poet, describes the sacrifice of "black cattle" ("nigras ... pecudes") alongside offerings to the spirits of the departed. Moreover, in the Aeneid, Virgil describes the hero Aeneas sacrificing heifers with dark backs ("nigrantis terga iuvencos") on the anniversary of the death of Anchises. Yet, as Ekroth notes, the majority of descriptions of ancient Roman sacrifices do not record the color of the sacrificial animal, and in the few cases where such information is documented, the impetus for the choice of color is sometimes unclear. Sacrifices of red animals are also known from ancient Roman religion: The dog sacrificed during the Robigalia was possibly red in color, and one inscription from Rome, dated between 84 and 96 CE, records the sacrifice of a red calf ("vitulo rubeo") as part of the Vulcanalia ceremony.

In his Satires, the 2nd-century CE poet Juvenal describes a "bull whitened with chalk" ("cretatumque bovem"), itself probably a reference to a passage from the 2nd-century BCE author Lucilius. The attempt to artificially whiten a sacrificial animal with chalk has been interpreted as an attempt to modify an otherwise unsuitable sacrificial animal. However, the classist Krzysztof Mogielnicki disputes this theory, arguing that such a practice could be interpreted as an attempt to deceive the gods, which would probably render it unacceptable to the Romans, who prided themselves of their piety and their strict adherence to rituals. Moreover, Mogielnicki argues that properly white cattle should have been easily accessible to individual within the city of Rome: Columella claims that Campania and Umbria both produced white oxen, and Varro writes that Italian cattle excel as offerings, though he does also state that white cattle were not as common in Italy as in Thrace or on the shores of the Gulf of Saros. Mogielnicki suggests that the whitening of sacrificial animals was perhaps comparable to the practice of politicians whitening their togae during elections so as to present themselves as more noble. Thus, instead of concealing imperfections, the white chalk may have served to accentuate the bright color of the animal.

Horace, a 1st-century BCE poet, in his Odes, describes a sacrifice of a young calf with a snow-white ("niveus") mark atop its forehead. This particular passage is, however, probably not a reliable description of Roman customs: It is more likely a reference to a passage Moschus’ second idyll. (Note: More specifically, a reference to Idylls. 2.84-85.) There are other references to animals with white marks on their forehead in Roman literature: Isidore of Seville, a 6th-century Hispano-Roman author, writes that horses with a "white forehead" ("frontem albam") are known as "calidi," though this passage does not describe a Roman religious practice, but instead an agricultural one. There is possibly a mention of a parallel religious ceremony in Umbrian culture: In the Iguvine tablets, a sacrifice of three oxen to the god Vofionus is detailed, wherein the victims are described with the adjective calersu, which itself has been etymologically linked with the Latin term calidus. However, even if this etymology is accepted, it would only attest to such a rite occurring in ancient Umbria; there are still no Roman sources that clearly indicate that the Romans practiced the same custom.

==== Sex ====
There is also evidence that the sex of the sacrificial victim and of the god generally matched: Castrated male animals were offered to male gods, whereas female animals were sacrificed to female gods. Arnobius is the only author to purport that this practice was not just a tendency, but a universal role: He writes that there is "a hidden and very secret reason" for the sacrificing of "female victims to the female deities" and "males to the male deities." Yet, Servius also describes the sacrifice of a female goat ("capra") in honor of the healing god Asclepius, supposedly because there "is never a goat without fever." According to the classicist Dimitrios Mantzilas, this particular ritual is perhaps an example of sacrifice per contrarietatem. Servius himself provides an example of sacrifice per contrarietatem, citing the ritual slaughter of a female pig ("porca") to the agricultural goddess Ceres, which is supposedly justified on the basis that pigs are harmful to crops ("obest frugibus"), Ovid provides further corroboration of this belief: In his Metamorphoses, the character of Pythagoras states that she was first condemned to death as a sacrificial victim because she rooted up the planted seeds and cut off the season's crop." According to the classicist Mark Golden, this sacrifice is seemingly premised on retribution: The pig has committed some offense and must be sacrificed as punishment. This idea might have been particularly archaic within ancient Greek culture: It may date back to the 5th-century BCE Athenian tragedian Aeschylus, who—in a surviving fragment of one play—described the sacrifice of "a pig of the same sow, who has done much harm in the house, turning everything topsy turvy."

There were other exceptions to these rules: Neptune, Mars, Janus, and the genius, for instance, received uncastrated animals as sacrifices. Moreover, Numa, a legendary ancient Roman king, was said by Ovid to have sacrificed an ewe ("ovem") to "the spring" ("fonti"), and to have also offered twin ewes ("geminas ... oves"), the first to the god Faunus and the second to Somnus. Moreover, the 2nd-century author Aulus Gellius writes that sacrifices of a female goat ("capra") were performed in honor of Vejovis. According to Plutarch—a 1st-century CE historian—the priests would slaughter female goats ("αἶγας," "aîgas") during the Lupercalia festival, presumably in honor of the god Faunus. There are multiple recorded instances of the sacrifice of a female animal to Jupiter: Varro writes that he received offerings of an ewe lamb ("agna") from the Flamen Dialis at the beginning of the grape harvest, Ovid mentions a sacrifice of a heifer ("iuvenca") that "had never known the yoke" performed by Numa, Servius details an ancient sacrifice performed by the Fetial priests whereby they stoned sows ("porca") in honor of Jupiter Lapis ("stone"), and Virgil records the kings Romulus and Titus Tatius swearing a pact beside the shrine of Jupiter and over a slaughtered female pig ("porca"). Hercules also received sacrifices of female animals: Macrobius describes a sacrificial ceremony, occurring on the twelfth day before the Kalends of January, during which a pregnant sow ("sue praegnante") was offered to Hercules and Ceres.

Servius claims that it was acceptable to substitute a male victim for a female one, though the reverse was not possible. However, there is no indication in any of the sources that the aforementioned sacrifices of female animals to male deities were repeats of previously failed rituals. Arnobius may provide an explanation for some of these seemingly exceptional rituals, describing a belief that "among the gods there is no difference of species, and that they are not distinguished by any sexes." Mantzilas argues that—in archaic Roman religion—deities and numina were conceptualized as abstract, formless entities that either lacked gender or were androgenous. According to Mantzilas, during this early time period, the sex of the sacrificial animal would not matter. as the gods lacked set genders. Later influence from Greek religion resulted in the development of iconic representations of gods and the codification of the particular traits of any given deity. However, Mantzilas argues that the occasional incongruence between the gender of the sacrificial animal and the recipient god are survivals of the early time period.

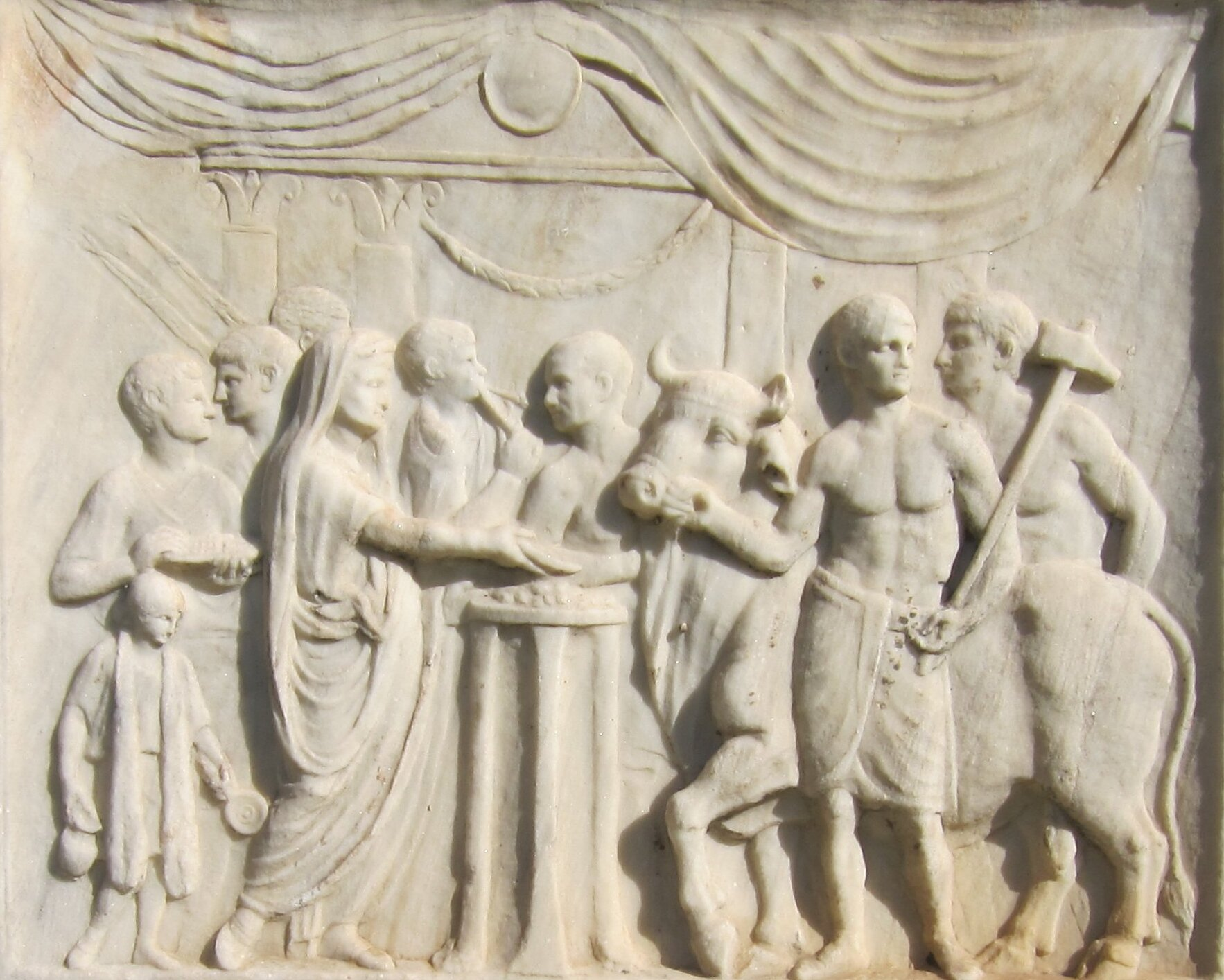
Sacrifice of a bull. Found on an altar at the Temple of Vespasian in Pompeii

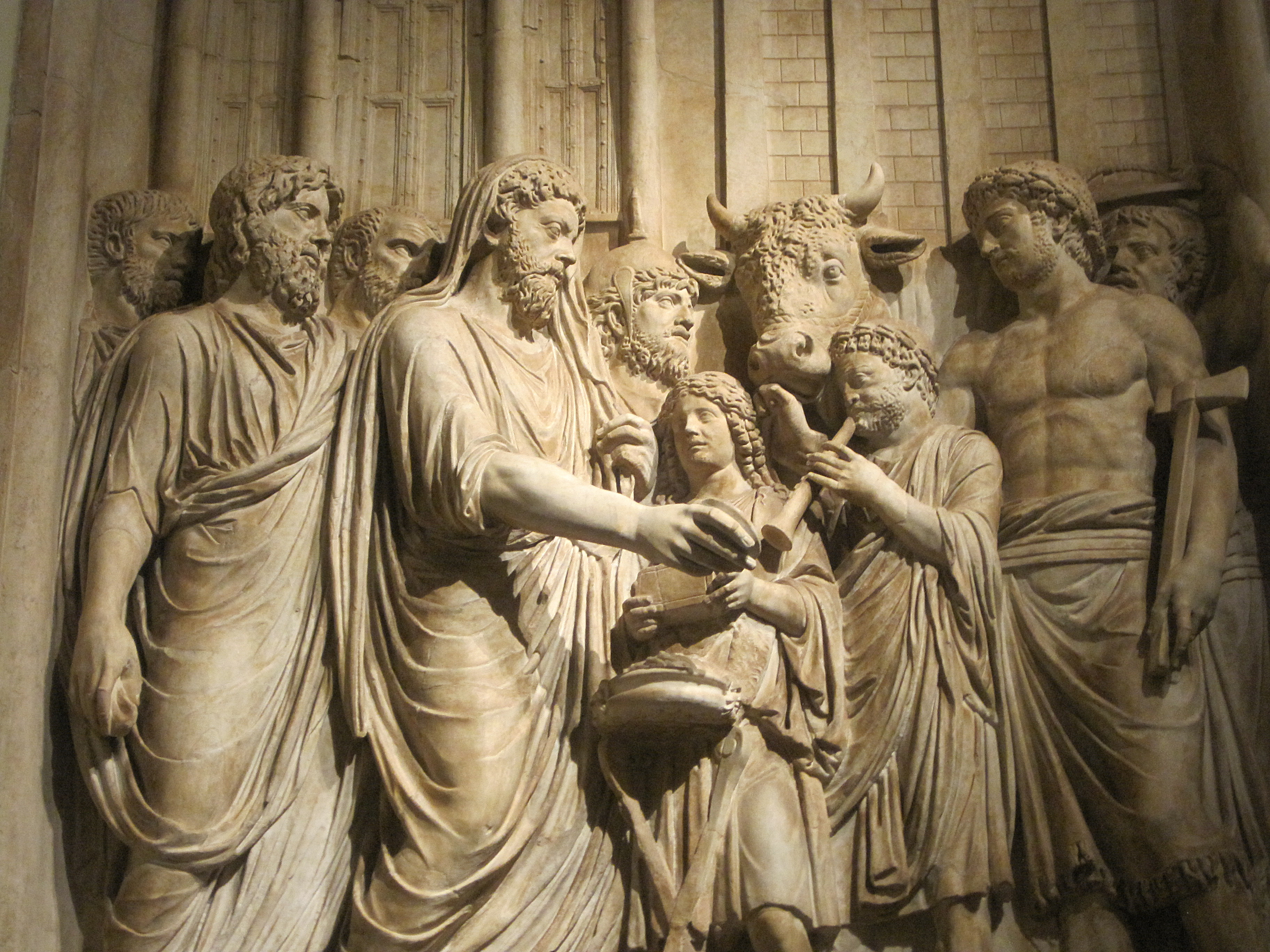
Relief depicting Marcus Aurelius standing beside a tibia player

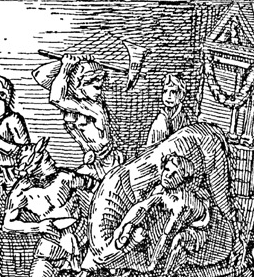
Execution of a sacrificial bull. Found a cup from the Boscoreale treasure

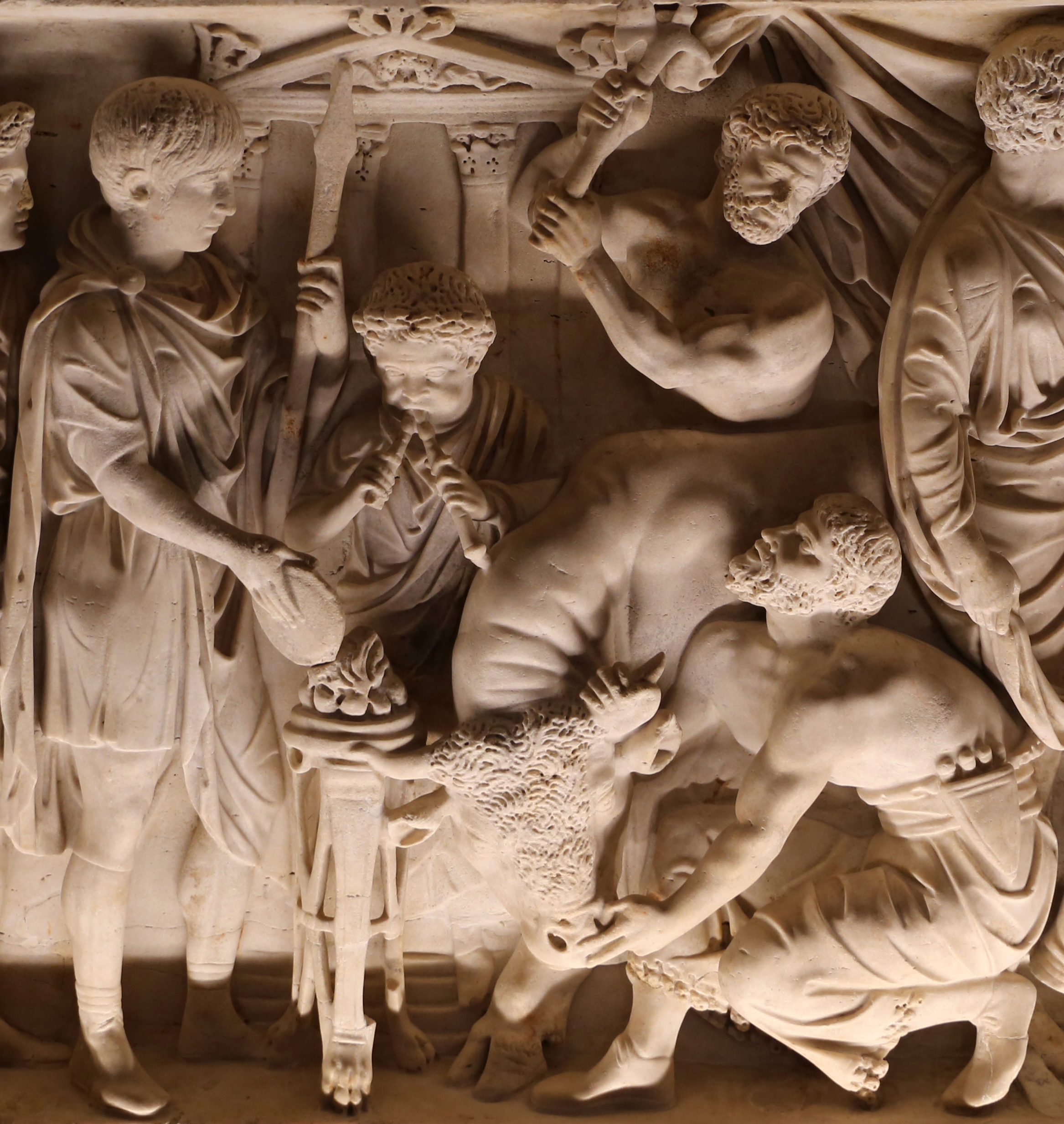
Ancient Roman sacrificial scene depicting the popa holding an axe about to strike the bull.

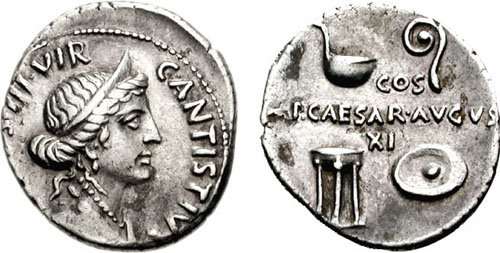
Denarius issued under Augustus, with a bust of Venus on the obverse, and ritual implements on the reverse: clockwise from top right, the augur's staff (lituus), libation bowl (patera), tripod, and ladle (simpulum)

=== Preparatory rites ===
Sacrificial depictions provide evidence for the performance of music during the ceremony: One relief, for instance, depicts Emperor Marcus Aurelius (r. 161–180) performing a sacrifice whilst a tibia-player (tibicen) stood nearby. The classicist Candace Livingston suggests that music perhaps helped calm the animals, noting that modern research on animals in the beef industry has also supported the soothing effect of music on cattle. Virgil, a 1st-century BCE Roman poet, mentions—during an account of a sacrificial rite—that "only the surface sand ("harena") is darkened with the thin gore," perhaps implying that sand lay strewn about the floor of the sacrificial area. According to Livingston, this sand perhaps would have provided traction for the animals, thereby minimizing their chance of slipping whilst walking across the marble pathways of most Roman temples, which would have been slippery—especially when coated in blood—and therefore somewhat treacherous for hooved beasts. Livingston also suggests it might have reduced the intensity of odors related to animal by-products, such as feces, urine, and gore.

In Roman artwork depicting sacrifices, the sacrificant—the individual paying for the ceremony—is distinguished by the presence of a toga fold covering their head, as if they were wearing a hood. For instance, on the altar at the Temple of Vespasian (r. 69–79) in Pompeii, a sacrificial scene includes an individual standing beside a tripod vessel with their head covered (capite velato), thereby identifying them as the sacrificant. At the beginning of a Roman sacrificial ritual, the hands of the sacrificant were ceremonially cleansed with water extracted from a moving source and then poured from a jug (gutus) by an adolescent minister. Afterwards, this minister would then catch the falling water in a bowl (polybrum) and hand a towel (mantele) to the sacrificant. On the Pompeian relief, the minister is identifiable as the young boy standing beside the sacrificant holding a jug and a bowl and wearing a scarf.

Once the preparatory washing had been completed, the sacrificant would then pour a libation (libatio) of wine and incense over a circular, portable hearth with a fire. The Acts of the Arval Brotherhood, for instance, reference the pouring of wine and incense on the fire of a type of small tripod altar known as a foculus ("ture et vino in igne in foculo facere"). Cato the Elder provides sacrificial instructions in which the libation is dedicated to Jupiter, Janus, and Vesta. In reliefs dated from the 1st to the 3rd century CE, various assistants known as camilli are often depicted holding incense boxes (acerra) at the ceremony. There is a 1st-century CE relief from Terni that portrays a veiled figure holding a casket in their left hand, probably to be identified as the incense box. Following the libation, the suppliants would complete a purificatory ritual known as the immolatio, wherein wine and mola salsa (salted spelt) made in a bowl known as the molucrum were sprinkled upon the animal. Servius, a late 4th-early 5th century CE Roman grammarian, records that prior to the immolation, a knife would be dragged across the back of the animal, from their head to their tail.

Only after these procedures had been completed could actual sacrifice begin. In Roman literature, the terms immolatio and immolare were often used as metonyms for the act of sacrificing itself, heavily implying that—to the Romans—the immolatio was an especially important section of the entire sacrificial ritual. Yet, the immolation itself rarely appears in Roman art; it is, for instance, absent from the Pompeian scene, though there does appear an adult attendant known as the camillus carrying an oval bowl itself identifiable as the molucrum. Republican and High Imperial public depictions of sacrifice do, however, most frequently portray the moment when the animal has been led to the altar, shortly prior to the sprinkling of the mola salsa. According to the classicist Celia E. Schultz, the tendency to highlight the immolatory rite indicates that this aspect of the ceremony was extremely significant to the Romans. On this basis, Schultz concludes that the Romans may have primarily understood the sacrificial ritual as the consecration, not the slaughter of animal.

=== Killing of the victim ===
Generally, it is thought that, once the animal had been led to the altar, to slay the beast, various priestly attendants would hold the creature down while another individual, the popa—depicted wearing a loincloth and holding a weapon in the Pompeian image—would ask the sacrificant "agene?" ("shall I act?") and then strike the animal with an axe or a hammer. This blow would perhaps stun the animal, but—to kill it—a cultrarius would pierce the carotid artery of the bull with a knife (culter). The usage of hammers in the execution of bovines is not limited to the Roman world, and modern medical science has supported their efficacy. There exists a particular location atop the skull of a bovine where a forceful strike may create a depressed fracture in the roof of the cranium and induce hemorrhaging in the brain, which can render the animal immediately unconscious.

However, Roman images showcase that the strike was performed from above, in which case the bull's skull would ideally be situated parallel to the ground to facilitate the most efficient execution, yet Roman artworks portray the animal with their skull angled perpendicularly. According to the Aldrete, in some Roman depictions of bovine sacrifices, the head of the animal is positioned so acutely that "it is hard to imagine how the popa would even have been able to make contact with the desired strike zone." Moreover, successfully performing this technique on the first strike requires significant precision and force, both of which are not consistently present in reality. Failure to immediately kill the animal would present major concern for the Romans, for whom an adverse reaction on the part of the sacrificial victim could compromise the integrity of the ritual. According to the classicist Gregory S. Aldrete, it is unlikely that the Romans would have opted for an unreliable method of sacrifice, on account of the expense and importance of the ritual.

Ultimately, Aldrete rejects the notion that axes or hammers were used to stun the animal, instead suggesting that the sacrificer aimed to strike the neck of the victim, thereby severing their spinal cord and immobilizing the animal. In Roman sacrificial scenes, the victimarii are depicted holding the neck the animal downwards, which would—according to modern anatomical science—create gaps between the vertebrae, exposing the underlying tissue of the spinal cord to the popa. Roman literary accounts imply that the popa targeted the neck of the animal: Ovid, a 1st-century BCE Roman poet, describes a sacrificial scene wherein the "axes struck at the brawny necks of bulls with ribbons about their horns." Virgil compares the cries of Laocoon to "the bellowings of a wounded bull that has fled from the altar and shaken from its neck the ill-aimed axe." Moreover, Seneca the Younger, a 1st-century CE Roman writer, describes Clytemnestra—before murdering Agamemnon—determining where to strike her axe just as the "attendant at the altar marks out the bulls’ necks by eye" prior to the sacrifice.

However, there are also certain literary descriptions of sacrifices wherein the head of the animal was targeted: Dionysius of Halicarnassus, a 1st-century BCE Greek historian, details a Roman sacrifice of oxen during which the attendants struck the temple of the animal with a hammer. Ovid, in addition to the aforementioned mention of an axe striking the neck during a sacrifice, also recounts one ceremony wherein a "suckling calf" ("lactentis vituli") is killed by a hammer ("malleus") striking the temples of its head. Aldrete suggests that hammers were used to strike the head when the sacrificial victim was a smaller animal with a lighter skull, such as a pig or a calf, but the method wherein axes were utilized to sever the spinal cord was employed when the victim was a larger animal such as a bull.

At the conclusion of a Roman sacrifice, the cultrarius would perform a diagonal cut across the throat of the animal, slitting the jugular veins and carotid arteries, which would cause the beast to lose a large amount of blood in a short period of time. Lucretius mentions the sprinkling of "altars with the blood of beasts in showers," which is perhaps a literal description of the ceremony given the immense blood loss induced by this procedure. The large quantity of blood spilt during sacrifices also perhaps motivated the choice of outfit for the victimarii, who are depicted bare-chested with an apron-like garment around their waists, possibly so as to avoid blood staining their clothing. Depictions of Roman sacrifices also showcase the group of priests standing separate to the victimarii, possibly as part of an attempt to protect their togas from blood splatter. Regarding the practicalities of slitting the throat, Roman depictions portray the cultrarius kneeling beside the animal, presumably awaiting the moment when it is struck by the popa and they are able to slash the neck of the animal utilizing their triangular knife.

=== Following the sacrifice ===
The exta were the entrails of a sacrificed animal, comprising in Cicero's enumeration the gall bladder (fel), liver (iecur), heart (cor), and lungs (pulmones). The exta were exposed for litatio (divine approval) as part of Roman liturgy, but were "read" in the context of the disciplina Etrusca. As a product of Roman sacrifice, the exta and blood are reserved for the gods, while the meat (viscera) is shared among human beings in a communal meal. The exta of bovine victims were usually stewed in a pot (olla or aula), while those of sheep or pigs were grilled on skewers. When the deity's portion was cooked, it was sprinkled with mola salsa (ritually prepared salted flour) and wine, then placed in the fire on the altar for the offering; the technical verb for this action was porricere.

== Human sacrifice ==
Human sacrifice in ancient Rome was rare but documented. After the Roman defeat at Cannae two Gauls and two Greeks were buried under the Forum Boarium, in a stone chamber "which had on a previous occasion [228 BC] also been polluted by human victims, a practice most repulsive to Roman feelings". Livy avoids the word "sacrifice" in connection with this bloodless human life-offering; Plutarch does not. The rite was apparently repeated in 113 BC, preparatory to an invasion of Gaul. Its religious dimensions and purpose remain uncertain.

In the early stages of the First Punic War (264 BC) the first known Roman gladiatorial munus was held, described as a funeral blood-rite to the manes of a Roman military aristocrat. The gladiator munus was never explicitly acknowledged as a human sacrifice, probably because death was not its inevitable outcome or purpose. Even so, the gladiators swore their lives to the gods, and the combat was dedicated as an offering to the Di Manes or the revered souls of deceased human beings. The event was therefore a sacrificium in the strict sense of the term, and Christian writers later condemned it as human sacrifice.

The small woolen dolls called Maniae, hung on the Compitalia shrines, were thought a symbolic replacement for child-sacrifice to Mania, as Mother of the Lares. The Junii took credit for its abolition by their ancestor L. Junius Brutus, traditionally Rome's Republican founder and first consul. Political or military executions were sometimes conducted in such a way that they evoked human sacrifice, whether deliberately or in the perception of witnesses; Marcus Marius Gratidianus was a gruesome example.

Officially, human sacrifice was obnoxious "to the laws of gods and men". The practice was a mark of the barbarians and thus associated with Rome's traditional enemies such as the Carthaginians and Gauls. Rome banned it on several occasions under extreme penalty. A law passed in 81 BC characterized human sacrifice as murder committed for magical purposes. Pliny the Elder saw the ending of human sacrifice conducted by the druids as a positive consequence of the conquest of Gaul and Britain. Despite an empire-wide ban under Hadrian, human sacrifice may have continued covertly in North Africa and elsewhere.

== Non-meat sacrifice ==
=== Vegetal items ===
Roman literary accounts showcase that, in addition to offerings of meat, products such as beans, wine, wheat, milk, and incense were also available for sacrifice. Varro, a 1st-century BCE author, describes the offering of cakes at the Liberalia, writing that "on that day priestesses of Liber, old women crowned with ivy, settle themselves throughout the whole town with cakes and a brazier, making sacrifices on behalf of the customer." Archaeological excavations in Pompeii revealed multiple deposits of burnt plant material at the House of Amarantus and the House of the Postumii, the majority of which consisted of common Mediterranean crops, such as cereals, field legumes, fruits, and nuts. These finds may relate to literary recounts of burnt offerings, such as is found in the works of Ovid. who mentions altars smoking with savine, and advises readers to—at the Feralia—bring small gifts to specially built pyres for the dead. Certain agrarian products were required to remain untouched prior to a sacrifice. Pliny the Elder, for instance, writes that people used to refrain from even tasting the produce of a new harvest prior to the priests' (sacerdotes) libations of the first fruits (primitias).

The Romans seemingly conceptualized of certain food sacrifices as the presentation of meals to deities. Cato the Elder, for instance, describes the offering of a feast ("dapem") to Jupiter Dapalis ("of the feast"), during which he recites a prayer and expresses his wish that Jupiter be "honored" by the sacrifice ("macte hac illace dape pollucenda esto"). According to the classicist Robert Schilling, it is likely that this ceremony was intended to "comfort" the gods, as part of the Roman emphasis on reciprocity in their religion and their belief that mortals ought to honor the gods, and thus in return the divine ought to provide protection. Whereas the ceremony described by Cato—the offering of a daps—was a sacrifice performed by individual families, other authors mention a much larger ritual organized by the state known as the "Epulum Iovis" ("feast of Jupiter"). Valerius Maximus—a 1st-century CE Roman author—writes that, at one such "banquet of Jupiter," Jupiter—presumably referencing a statue of the god—rested upon a couch ("lectulum"), whereas Minerva and Juno sat upon nearby chairs ("sellas"). According to the scholar of Roman religion William Warde Fowler, it is likely that the inclusion of statues depicting Roman deities was a later innovation that emerged under Etruscan influence. However, in older Italic tradition, it was believed that the gods were spiritually present at religious meals. Ovid, a 1st-century BCE Roman poet, references such a practice, writing that "it used to be the custom of old ... to believe that the gods were present at table."

==== Polluctum ====
The ritual described by Cato the Elder is presumably an example of a polluctum: He specifically utilizes the word pollucere ("to offer up") to describe this rite, advising the suppliant to pollucere a cup of wine and the ritual meal. Varro provides further details regarding this ceremony, writing that edible or drinkable items were offered at the altar of Hercules as part of the ritual. (Note: In some manuscripts, the text reads pollutum instead of polluctum.) Macrobius records an earlier passage from Varro, wherein he supposedly described an ancient practice of promising ("vovere") a tithe ("decimam") to Hercules, which is likely the same practice referred to by Varro in De Lingua Latina. It remains unclear exactly how the Romans conceptualized the polluctum, and it is likely that the precise nuances of the term are irrecoverable. Varro, besides describing the nature of the practice, also mentions certain pieces of linguistic information concerning the terminology. However, Varro's description seemingly confuses the verbs pollucere and profanare ("to offer in sacrifice"), and—on the basis of this passage—they appear identical in meaning. According to Varro, the word etymologically connects to the verb porricere ("to offer as a sacrifice"), though this statement is most certainly inaccurate. The Indo-Europeanist scholar Alan Nussbaum alternatively links the word to the root of licet ("it is proper"). Food items were evidently closely linked to the polluctum in the Roman mind: Plautus—a 3rd-century BCE Roman playwright—utilizes the term pollucti to describe an ordinary meal unrelated to any religious ritual.

=== Serveware ===
Schultz argues that, besides any kind of food, more ordinary household items were subject to sacrifice, citing a particular passage from the 2nd-century author Apuleius, who recounts that "poverty has established from the very beginning an empire for the Roman people and, on behalf of this, still today she sacrifices to the immortal gods a little ladle ("simpulo") and a dish made of clay ("catino fictili")." Moreover, Pliny the Elder writes that Marcus Curius Dentatus—a 3rd-century BCE Roman general renowned for his frugality—once had taken no loot "praeter guttum faginum, quo sacrificaret." If the term quo ("which") is interpreted as an instrumental ablative, this sequence could be translated as "except a beechwood cruet with which he would offer sacrifice." However, Schultz argues that, when the verb sacrificare ("to offer sacrifice") is paired with the ablative, the noun typically functions as the object of the sacrifice itself, in which case the text most likely means that Curius had offered the "guttum faginum" ("beechwood cruet") to the gods.

The rites described in these literary accounts may connect to the votive deposits uncovered throughout Italy containing large quantities of small vessels such as plates or cups and figurines depicting animals such as cows or birds. However, these votive pits represent a widespread ritual spanning multiple centuries and occurring across hundreds of locations, and yet—according to Schultz—it would only have been mentioned in two literary sources. Nevertheless, Schultz argues that such sparse documentation is consistent with other Roman religious rites, noting, for instance, that there are also only a select few references to the Roman practice of creating votive deposits filled with items cleaned out from overfilled temples. In any case, the household items available for offering were all domestic serveware, which may reflect the connection between sacrifice and eating. Functionally, these objects may have served as substitutes for more expensive edible sacrifices provided that the devotee suffered from financial constraints. However, Schultz also notes that these miniature ceramics were perhaps not actually less costly than other sacrificial materials and that Apuleius and Pliny merely misunderstand the nature of a practice common to poor of ancient Rome.
