= Genius (mythology) =

Divine nature in ancient Roman religion

In Roman religion, the genius (Latin: [ˈɡɛnɪ.ʊs]; pl.: genii) is the individual instance of a general divine nature that is present in every individual person, place, or thing. Much like a guardian angel, the genius would follow each man from the hour of his birth until the day he died. The genius of each female, representing the female reproductive power, was a Juno.

== Nature ==
=== Entities capable of possessing a genius ===
In Roman religion, genii were varyingly associated with people, deities, and places (genius loci). One funerary inscription from Rome, for instance, is dedicated to the spirits of the departed (manes) and the genius of Gaius Julius Nicerotis. According to scholar of Roman religion Georges Dumézil, the original association of the genius with the personhood of any particular individual allowed for the concept to broaden to include the metaphorical personifications of more abstract concepts. Inscriptions eventually came to reference the genii of various gods, the earliest example of which appears on a text dating to 58 BCE from Furfo, wherein a sacrifice to "Jupiter Liber and Jupiter's genius" is described. Numina could also have genii, as indicated by several ancient inscriptions, one of which—found near Tibur—was dedicated to the "genius of the numen of Priapus," and another text from Rome mentions the genius of the numen the Fontis Sermo(nalis?). However, there is no instance wherein a genius is accredited with numen, perhaps on account of their status as minor deities. By the Imperial period, numen—originally the force by which a divinity manifested their power—came to be used metonymically to describe deities, and—according to the classicist Duncan Fishwick—since the genii were only ever minor gods, they were perhaps never deemed worthy of holding numen.

The city of Rome could have a genius, for the 4th-century CE author Servius the Grammarian records a shield in the Capitoline hill upon which was inscribed the phrase "for the genius of the city of Rome, be it either male or female" ("genio urbis Romae, sive mas sive femina"). Livy describes the sacrifice of five fully-grown animals to the genius in 218 or 217 BCE, between the Roman defeats at Trebia and Lake Trasimene, presumably referring to either the genius of the city of Rome or the genius of the Roman people (genius populi Romani). Cassius Dio, a 2nd-century Greek historian, provides the first literary reference to the genius publicus, referencing—whilst describing a series of prodigies that occurred in the year 43 BCE—the existence of a temple ("νεὼ," "neṑ") to the ("Γενίου τοῦ δήμου") by the Temple of Concordia. In a later passage, Cassius Dio once again references this same temple, this time in the context of prodigies within the year 32 BCE. Ancient Roman calendars record a sacrifice on the 9th of November to the genius populi Romani alongside Venus Victrix and Felicitas on the Capitoline hill, implying that a temple to the genius also existed in this location. Though the sacrifices were offered for these three entities, it is not clear whether the temple itself was dedicated exclusively to the genius or perhaps to all three gods.

=== Role as a protective spirit ===
In the comedies of the 3rd-century BCE playwright Plautus, the genius is heavily connected to personal pleasure. For example, in The Persian, a character describes spending lavishly for their own sake as performing "many good turns for [their] genius" ("genio meo multa bona faciam"). When a character devotes themselves to hedonistic pursuits, such as the enjoyment of wine and bountiful meals, they are said to be indulging their genius. In this context, according to the classicist Kathryn Argetsinger, the genius seems "to mean little more than the self, or perhaps some internal part of the self—the soul or the appetite." However, also within the writings of Plautus, the genius is otherwise treated as a divine entity external to the individual with whom they were connected, for parasite characters—a stock archetype in Roman comedy—sometimes refer to their benefactors as their genius. In contrast to the characters who satiate their genius, there exists older men—miser archetypes—who "defraud" their genius by denying them offerings of food and nourishment. Ultimately, the genius—within the writings of Plautus—is particularly associated with food and wine, and not other types of pleasure, such as a sexual gratification, which is reserved for the animus. This connection to food and wine resurfaces in the ceremonies honoring this spirit, such as those described by the 1st-century BCE poet Tibullus, who describes a birthday feast wherein cakes and wine were offered to the genius.

Within Roman esotericism, there was an association with the concepts of juice (sucus, umor) and vitality. Younger people, and those who frequently drank wine, were endowed with much of this proverbial sap of life. Older people, however, alongside the poor, the thin, the hungry, the thirsty, and the sober were all described as "dry" (siccus, aridus) in Roman comedy. Accordingly, the individuals within Plautine and Terentian plays who adequately propitiate their genius are young, whereas it is the older miser characters that are more stingy with their offerings. Thus, the protective force of the genius is perhaps ultimately premised upon this notion of sappiness as the essence of vitality—those who provide the right offerings for their genius shall enhance their sucus and, by extension, their own personal vigor. According to the classicist Sari Mattero, when parasite characteristics refer to their patrons as their genius, they are implying that—by supporting them and therefore sustaining the parasite's sucus—the patron has, in effect, become their genius. Consequently, in one Plautine play, The Captives, it is stated that—when these patrons leave for the countryside during the summer—the parasites are reduced to a miserable state much akin to snails in hot weather that have to hide in their shells and subsist "on their own juice" ("suo sibi suco vivont").

The 4th-century Roman historian Ammianus Marcellinus provides explicit descriptions of the protective nature of a genius. According to Ammianus, theologians ("theologi") maintain that all men, at their birth, are joined with some divine force ("quaedam ... numina") at birth, which works to guide their conduct, and yet are only ever seen by a select few men with "manifold virtues" ("multiplices ... virtutes"). Ammianus then states that, in the poems of Homer, the divinities with whom characters sometimes interact are best understood not as "heavenly deities" ("deos caelestes"), but instead as the household genii ("familiaris genios"), by whose aid important figures such as Pythagoras, Socrates, Scipio Africanus, Marius, Augustus, Numa Pompilius, Apollonius of Tyana, Plotinus, and Hermes Trismegistus become illustrious individuals ("enituisse"). According to Ammianus, the author Plotinus attempted to study the nature of such spirits, seeking to devise the elements ("primordiis") by which genii were joined to the souls of mortals ("hi genii animis conexi mortalium"), whom they seek to protect as much as possible and give instruction, provided that they sense the individual to be pure ("puras") and free from the corruption of sin on account of an "immaculate" body ("si senserint puras et a colluvione peccandi, immaculata corporis societate discretas"). Ammianus also cites another Ancient Greek author regarding this subject, the comic poet Menander, who wrote "a spirit ("δαίμων," "daímōn") is assigned to every man when born to guide him in the path of life."

Ammianus records that Julian the Apostate, shortly before he became Emperor, had a dream wherein he was visited by the genius publicus—the guardian spirit of the empire. Within the dream, the genius told Julian that it had long been watching him with a desire to increase his rank, and yet it had been continuously rejected and had left sorrowfully. Ultimately, the genius declares to Julian that if it was not now accepted, it would leave, never to return. Ammianus records that Julian saw the genius publicus once again prior to his death; he supposedly witnessed the saddened spirt passing through the curtains of his tent, holding a cornucopia and with its head veiled. The same author documents a similar story for Constantius II, who supposedly once ceased to see a certain vision ("secretum") that appeared to him, albeit dimly ("squalidus"), which he took as a sign that his genius—otherwise appointed to protect his welfare ("tutelae salutis appositus")—had abandoned him, for he was soon about to die.

=== Connection to childbirth and lineage ===
Besides functioning as a general guardian spirit, the genius also had associations with childbirth. Horace, a 1st-century BCE lyric poet, describes the genius as "the companion which controls the natal star; the god of human nature, in that he is mortal for each person, with a changing expression, white or black." The phrase "white or black" ("albus et ater") was a proverbial expression in Latin usually expressing indifference, though in this case it probably refers to good and bad fortune, for the genius is present when an individual experiences either. Moreover, according to Censorinus, the genius is the "god under whose protection one was born and lives," a phenomenon for which he offers several explanations. Censorinus states that it is either because the genius took care that individuals were born in the first place, or that they were born alongside regular humans, or that the genius received and offered protection for persons upon their birth. Furthermore, Censorinus writes that the genius is such an assiduous watcher that they do not abandon those under their care for even a moment, and they remain with an individual from when they are born until they die.

The 3rd-century grammarian Censorinus claims that the word genius is certainly ("certe") called a such from the act of generating ("genendo"). St Augustine, a 4th-century Christian author, notes the dual nature of the genius, writing—whilst attempting to criticized earlier Roman religion—that, according to the 1st-century BCE author Varro, the genius is a "god" who "has command and control over all things begotten" ("Quid est Genius? 'Deus,' inquit, 'qui praepositus est ac vim habet omnium rerum gignendarum.'") and also that the genius is the "rational soul of a man and that every individual has one" ("genium dicit esse uniuscuiusque animum rationalem et ideo esse singulos singulorum"). Isidore of Seville, a 6th-century author, also records a connection between the genius and familial matters, writing that "they name the genius as such because it has the power, as it were, of generating all things, or from generating children, whence also the lecti geniales are termed as such by the pagans, since they are spread out for a newlywed." Other authors connect the lectus genialis—the marriage bed—to the genius, with the 2nd-century grammarian Sextus Pompeius Festus writing that the bed is laid out for the bride in honor of the genius, whence it received its name. Moreover, the 4th-century Christian apologist Arnobius describes rituals invoking the genii during the Roman wedding ceremony, writing "when you marry, you make little beds with a toga and you invoke the genii of your husbands."

These associations with childbirth are merely an extension of its role as a guardian spirit, for—given the importance placed upon kinship (i.e. one's gens) in Roman society—the genius of the pater familias could naturally come to be viewed as guiding him through the process of continuing his family lineage. The 1st-century BCE Roman author Tibullus explicitly expresses hope for the future children of an individual named Messala whilst offering to the genius on their birthday, stating "as for you, Messala, may you see your children growing up, who will add to the exploits of their father and, already famous, surround him in his old age." Thus, Dumézil concludes that the genius was not associated with the act of procreation; they were instead responsible for protecting and guiding the children begotten from any relationship. According to Dumézil, there is no evidence of a connection between the genius and sexual matters in Roman comedy, where the genius is instead often related to personal pleasure. In fact, Dumézil argues the body part most explicitly connected to the genius in Roman literature is not any sexual organ, but instead the forehead, since the 4th-century CE author Servius the Grammarian claims that "the forehead (is consecrated) to the genius" ("frontem Genio (consecratam esse)"). However, according to the classicist Sari Mattero, the forehead is by no means entirely disconnected from procreative symbolism, for it can just as easily be considered the "seat and symbol of life." Furthermore, within Greco-Roman medical science, the head was conceptualized as a source of semen. Nevertheless, Mattero concludes that—due to the absence of the genius from explicitly sexual contexts—the genius was a spirt of fertility more generally, whereas love and sex both fell outside of its domain.

According to Mattero, it was believed in ancient Rome that food and wine, the kind associated with genii, functioned as aphrodisiacs. Apuleius, for instance, a 2nd-century author, describes a scene where the lovers and Photis and Lucius both drink wine prior to sex so as to intensify their desire. Moreover, the conception of the "juice" ("sucus") as a kind of life force would have tied into contemporary Greek medical and philosophical thought, wherein bodily fluids—such as the marrow—were envisioned as a source of life. For example, the 5th-century BCE Greek philosopher Plato writes that "as regards the bones and the flesh and all such substances the position was this. All these had their origin in the generation of the marrow." On this basis, Mattero argues that individuals who sufficiently propitiated their genii would have been believed to have become more virile and more fertile. To resolve the conflict between the apparent fertility associations of the genius and its lack of any connection to sexual activity, Mattero argues that—in classical antiquity—reproduction and love were believed to reduce one's sucus, and therefore, their vitality. For example, Propertius—a 1st-century BC Roman poet—describes love waging constant war ("assiduusque ... bella gerit") at the cost of his blood ("sanguine") and he mentions that this love resided within his "dried out marrow" ("siccis ... medullis"), all until he is reduced to a "poor shadow" of himself ("non ego, sed tenuis vapulat umbra mea."). Under this interpretation, amorous matters were harmful to the genius, and therefore sex and love are naturally never mentioned as its pleasures. Regardless, the food and wine offered to the spirit, and the corollary increases in sucus, were however—according to Mattero—necessary prerequisites for procreation.

==== Association with birthday rituals ====
Genii were also associated with birthday rituals in ancient Rome and ceremonies and offerings were provided for the genius on this day. Within an elegy of the 1st-century BCE poet Sulpicia, the author invokes the genius her beloved, a man named Cerinthus—on his birthday—and instructs the spirit to take the incense willingly and willingly grant his prayers, so as long he reciprocates her affection. Should he fall in love with another woman, she requests that the genius desert the "faithless altar." Another elegy celebrates the birthday of an individual named Cornutus, whose genius is also summoned to come and view the offering themselves, while "delicate floral crowns grace his holy hair" and his temples are "wet with pure nard." Moreover, the poem mentions the genius taking "his full of honey cakes" and becoming "drunk with unwatered wine."

Tibullus also describes his own participation in a birthday ceremony for someone else, wherein he also invokes the genius. Like the aforementioned accounts, Tibullus mentions the anointing and crowning of the spirit, stating "let unguents drip from his shining hair" and "let his head and neck be circled with delicate wreathes." However, unlike the prior stories, Tibullus portrays himself as more actively involved in the ceremony—in this version, he personally brings the incense and the honeyed cakes. In the 1st-century BCE poet Ovid's accounts of celebrating his own birthday rites, all of the above accoutrements are mentioned, with the addition of a white raiment and wreaths adorning the altar. Ovid describes himself wearing a "white robe" and approaching a "smoking altar garlanded with chaplets" while "grains of incense" snap in the "holy fire" and he offers the "cakes." Ovid mentions the exact same details again whilst describing the performance of the rituals for his wife's birthday, wherein he again adorns "white garb" and intends to pour incense and wine into the fire. The altar itself is described as green and made from "grassy turf," and the "warm hearth" is veiled with a "braided garland."

According to Censorinus, it was customary among the "ancestors" ("maiores") for an individual to, when supplicating the genius on one's birthday, abstain from killing any sacrificial victim, so as to avoid the death of another on the same day when one was born. This proscription, however, may have only applied to the individual on whose birthday the ceremony occurred, whereas other individuals perhaps were permitted to sacrifice to the genius. It evidently was possible for sacrifices to occur for the genius on someone's birthday, as—during the reign of Nero (r. 54–58)—the Acta Arvalia describes the slaughter of a bull on the emperor's birthday. However, animal sacrifices to the imperial genii are not recorded before the time of Nero. In any case, Horace—when describing the birthday celebration for his friend Maecenas—mentions an "altar covered with pure foliage that craves to be sprinkled about with sacrificed lamb ("ara castis vincta verbenis avet immolato spargier agno"). Horace does not actually specify the recipient deity of this procedure, also allowing for the possibility that this ceremony was not directed towards the genius of Maecenas.

=== Relation to other religious concepts ===
Unlike the Lares, which were usually depicted as collective entities, the genii were conceptualized as individual spirits. Censorinus does state that "many ancients" ("multi veteres") reported that the genii and the Lares were the same, a claim for which he cites a source—that being, Granius Flaccus, an author who supposedly wrote a book for Julius Caesar regarding the indigitamenta. However, this belief is at odds with Censorinus's own description of the genius as coming to an individual at their birth and leaving upon their death, attributes which are never ascribed to the Lares. Moreover, the classicist Harriet Flower argues that Roman art from Campania clearly depicts the genius and Lares as different entities worshipped in separate ways. According to Flower, Censorinus was likely attempting to mention an alternative scholarly viewpoint in order to provide his readers with a more comprehensive view of the subject and to demonstrate his own erudition by portraying himself as well-read while also correcting an opposing viewpoint.

Some inscriptions seem to treat the numen and genius as if they were identical concepts. For example, one text dated to 182 CE from Malchika in Moesia Inferior is dedicated to the numen of "our Augustus" ("Aug(usti) n(ostri)") and of the "public portorium" ("p(ublici) p(ortorii)"). Fishwick argues that it would be unusual to envision the portorium holding numen in the same manner as the emperor, and that the author of this text most probably omitted the word genius, which is ascribed to the portorium in an older text dated between 161-169 CE from the same region. In other instances, the genius and the numen of the same individual are both propitiated separately within the same text, clearly demonstrating that both concepts are separate. For example, one text dated to 18 CE from Forum Clodii describes the genii and the numina of the emperors Augustus and Tiberius (r. 14–37) both being summoned to eat.

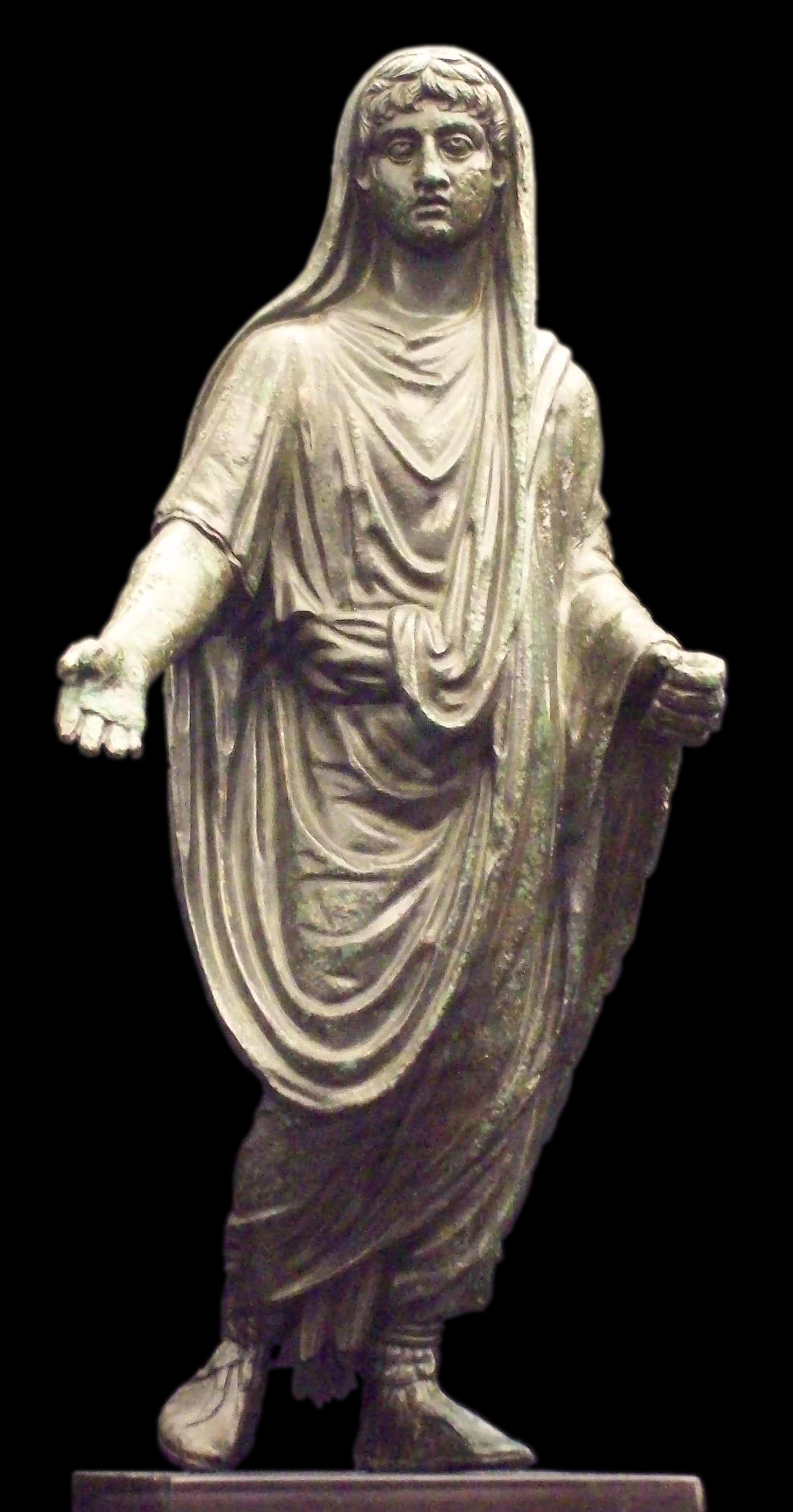
Bronze genius depicted as pater familias (1st century AD)

== History of the concept ==
=== Origin ===
Etymologically, the word genius ultimately derives from the Proto-Indo-European root *ǵenh₁- ("to produce, beget, generate"). There are other, potentially parallel formations in other Indo-European branches, such as Proto-Germanic *kunją ("kin, family, clan") and Sanskrit jánya ("belonging to the same race, culture"), which could suggest inheritance from an earlier stage of the language. However, according to the philologist Michiel de Vaan, the semantics of the word strongly indicate that it was an independent innovation within Latin, on the basis of either genus ("birth, descent, origin; race, kind") or geno ("to bring forth"). Dumézil compares the term to ingenium, a word which denotes a innate qualities inborn or instilled since birth. According to Dumézil, the meaning of a putative noun *genium could then be ascertained by merely removing the influence of the prefix in- from ingenium, on which basis he concludes that this hypothetical word *genium would have meant something akin to "the character of that which has been born." In the case, the word genius would have merely been a personalization of this base noun *genium.

According to the classicist Alexander Ekserdjian, the style of winged genius found in the villa of Publius Fannius Synistor has its origins in Etruscan art. For instance, at the Etruscan site of Talamonaccio, a sculpture of a winged genius-like figure has been discovered. The statue has crossed legs, which likely represents a dance maneuver. Such a pose is as the Kreuzschritt in Etruscan scholarship, and it is found frequently in 3rd-century BCE Etruscan mirrors, where it is often utilized for winged beings. Moreover, the left heel of the statue is raised greatly while its right foot points downwards, both of which—according to Ekserdjian—confer onto the figure a "lightness of pose." Whereas the legs showcase signs of fluid motion, the wings are rather static—they are attached at the shoulders and extend straight downwards. In particular, one Etruscan terracotta pediment from Civitalba mixes Dionysiac imagery with that of winged beings, as is found in the villa of Synistor. Within the pediment, three winged figures stand beside a missing central statue, which—given the presence of a thiasus—was probably once the god Bacchus-Liber. Amongst Etruscan funerary steles from Bologna, the deceased is often depicted traveling to the Underworld on a chariot, while a winged genius runs ahead of the vehicle, guiding the dead on their travels.

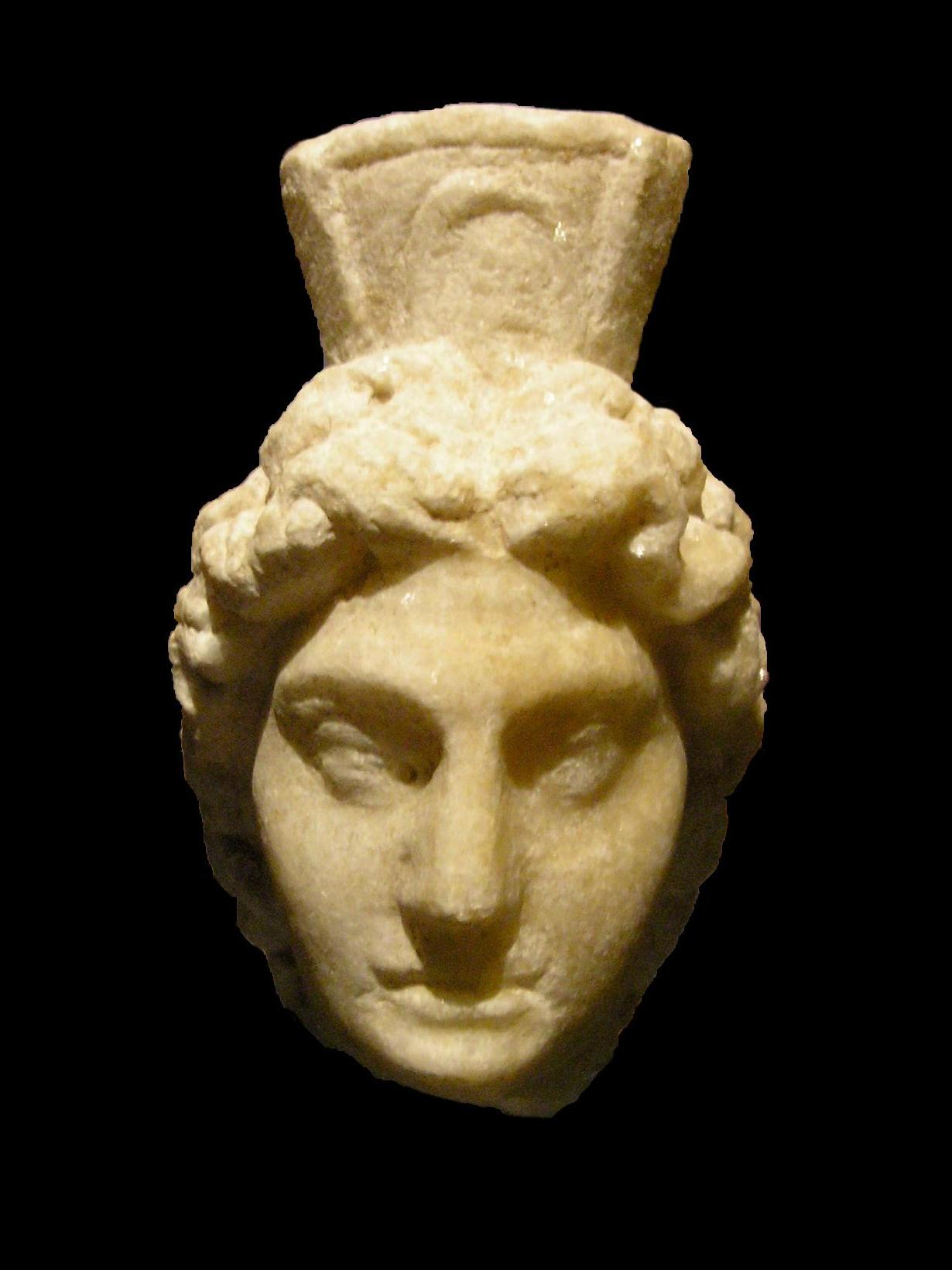
Head of a genius wearing a modius, found at Vindobona, the Roman military camp in Pannonia (2nd century AD)

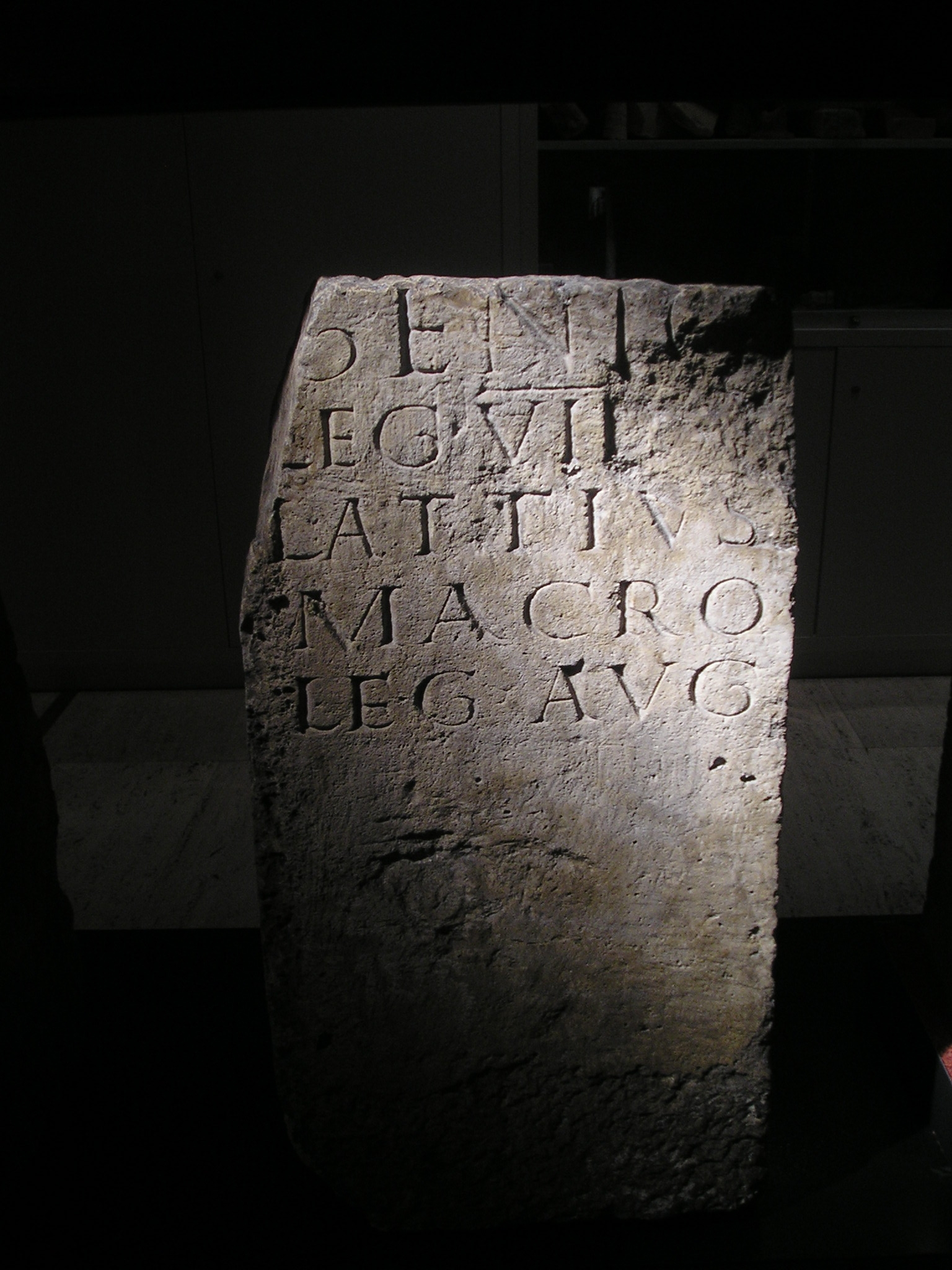
Inscription on votive altar to the genius of Legio VII Gemina by L. Attius Macro (CIL II 5083)

The genius appears explicitly in Roman literature as early as Plautus, where one character jests that the father of another is so avaricious that he uses cheap Samian ware in sacrifices to his own genius, so as not to tempt the genius to steal it. In Republican Roman religion, it was standard practice for an oath to be sworn by one's genius. In the play Andria by the 2nd-century BCE author Terence, for instance, the character of Chrysis compels Pamphilus to swear by his genius not to abandon Glycerium. According to the classicist J. Rufus Fears, the introduction of the genius populi Romani into Rome is probably the result of Hellenistic influence. The year of either 218 or 217 BCE, perhaps the earliest attestation for such a genius, was a time of great political turmoil, which would have inspired public discontent with the existing social order, thereby enticing a shift in the dominant religious practices of Rome. At the same time when the Romans were looking for an adjustment to their cultural environment, they were undergoing significant exposure to nearby Greek cultures, and they adopted the Hellenic idea of the Demos. Fears argues that the genius populi Romani would have served as a manifestation of the will and desires of the Roman people, in much the same way that other contemporary ruler cults premised the divinity of their leaders upon their ability to grant the same benefits as a god. Since Rome at the time lacked any singular head of state, but was instead a Republic, such a ruler cult for Rome most naturally took the form of a personification of the general Roman community, just as Greek city states worshipped the personification of the Demos.

=== Imperial genii ===
Fears proposes that the incipient worship of the Genius Augusti was essentially the same development as the creation of the genius populi Romani—both were personifications of the entity responsible for upholding the Roman people. The classicist Lily Ross Taylor similarly argues that the imperial genius would have served as a symbolic representation of the future of the ruling dynasty, and the current emperor's ability to produce future generations of rulers and ensure continued prosperity for the empire. Emperor Tiberius (r. 14–37) reportedly, according to 2nd-century Greek historian Cassius Dio, forbade anyone from swearing by his "Tyche" ("τύχην," "túkhēn"), perhaps referring to his genius. According to Fishwick, it is likely that Tiberius felt it would be inappropriate to grant himself such an honor out of a belief that it should be reserved for Augustus. However, Emperor Caligula (r. 37–41) supposedly did demand that others swear by his genius, for the 1st-century historian Suetonius states that Caligula would execute anyone who had never sworn by his genius.

The custom of swearing by the genius extended to the Imperial genius, which now featured in the official oath of the state cult. Under Domitian, the oath reads as follows: "through Jupiter and divine Augustus and divine Claudius and divine Vespasianus Augustus and divine Titus Augustus and the genius of the Imperator Caesar Domitianus Augustus and the Di Penates" ("per Iovem et divom Aug(ustum) et div(u)m Claudium et divom Vesp(asianum) Aug(ustum) et divom Titum Aug(ustum) et Genium Imp(eratoris) Caesaris Domitiani Aug(usti) deosque Penates"), as recorded on an inscription from Utrera. In epigraphy, suppliants sometimes propitiate both the numen and the genius of a living emperor, though they never perform any ritual for the genius of a past ruler, whereas dedications are made to the numina of deceased individuals.

If the genius of the imperator, or commander of all troops, was to be propitiated, so was that of all the units under his command. The provincial troops expanded the idea of the genii of state; for example, from Roman Britain have been found altars to the genii of Roma, Roma aeterna, Britannia, and to every legion, cohors, ala and centuria in Britain, as well as to the praetorium of every castra and even to the vexillae. Inscriptional dedications to genius were not confined to the military. From Gallia Cisalpina under the empire are numerous dedications to the genii of persons of authority and respect; in addition to the emperor's genius principis, were the genii of patrons of freedmen, owners of slaves, patrons of guilds, philanthropists, officials, villages, other divinities, relatives and friends. Sometimes the dedication is combined with other words, such as "to the genius and honor" or in the case of couples, "to the genius and Juno".

Surviving from the time of the empire hundreds of dedicatory, votive and sepulchral inscriptions ranging over the entire territory testify to the flourishing of official cult (cultus) of genius. Stock phrases were abbreviated: GPR, genio populi Romani ("to the genius of the Roman people"); GHL, genio huius loci ("to the genius of this place"); GDN, genio domini nostri ("to the genius of our master"), and so on. In 392 AD with the final victory of Christianity Theodosius I declared the veneration of the genii, Lares and Penates to be treason, ending their official terms.

== Roman iconography ==
=== Libation scenes with Lares ===
Painting from Pompeii depicting a genius performing a libation

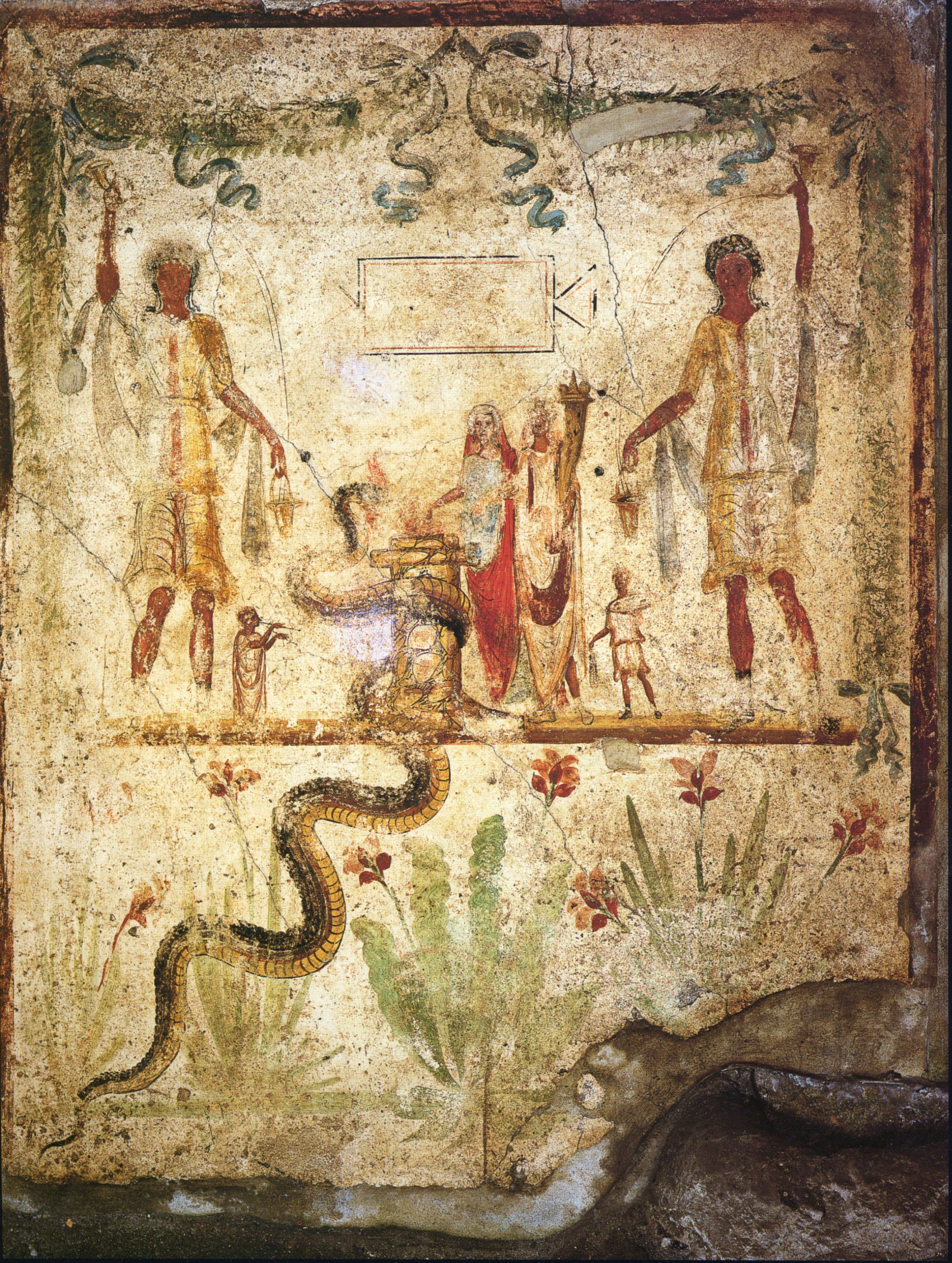
Lararium with small, central ancestral genius figure flanked by Lares, above a serpent-genius representing fertility. House of Julius Polybius, Pompeii.

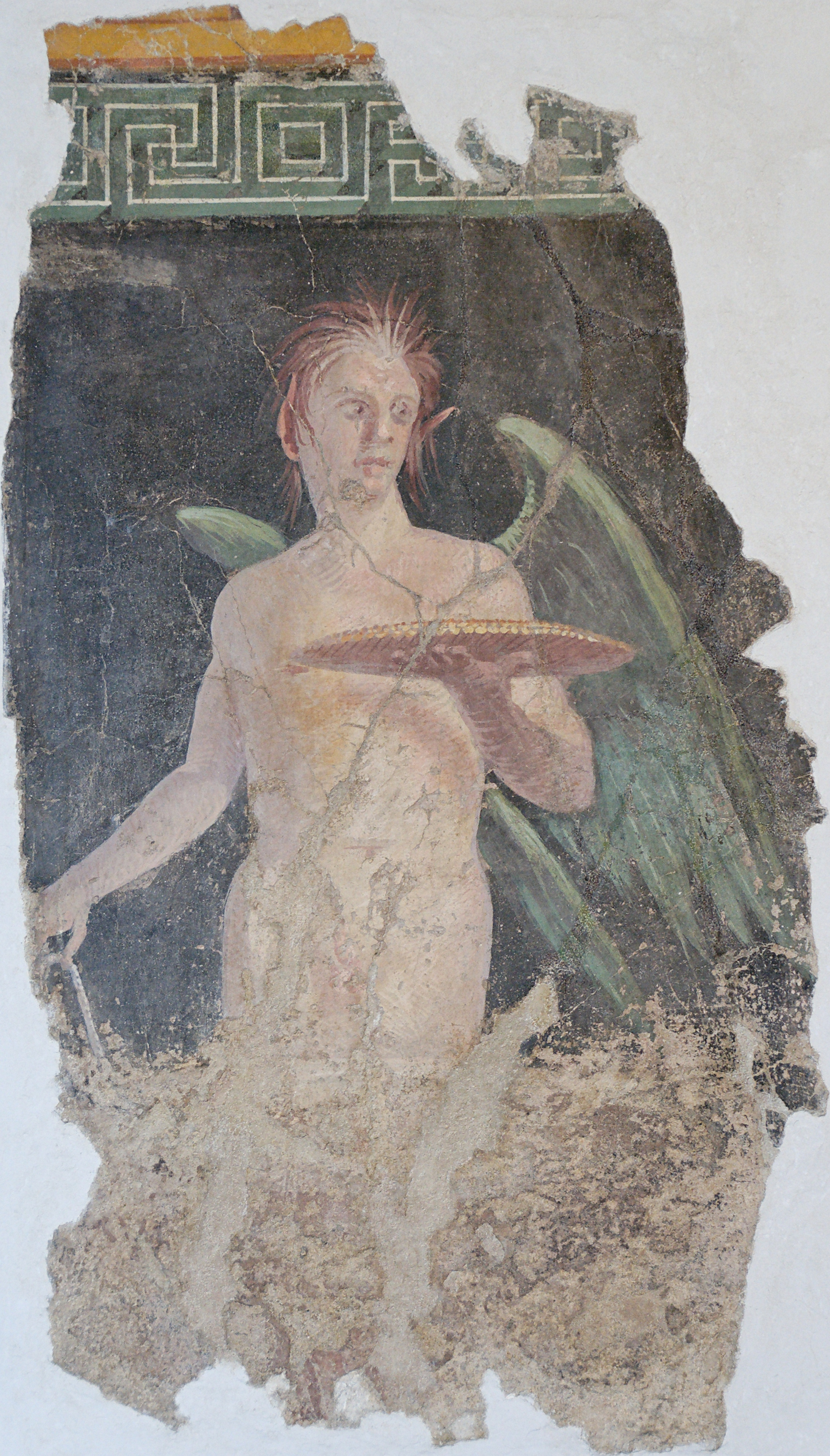
Male genius from the villa of Publius Fannius Synistor

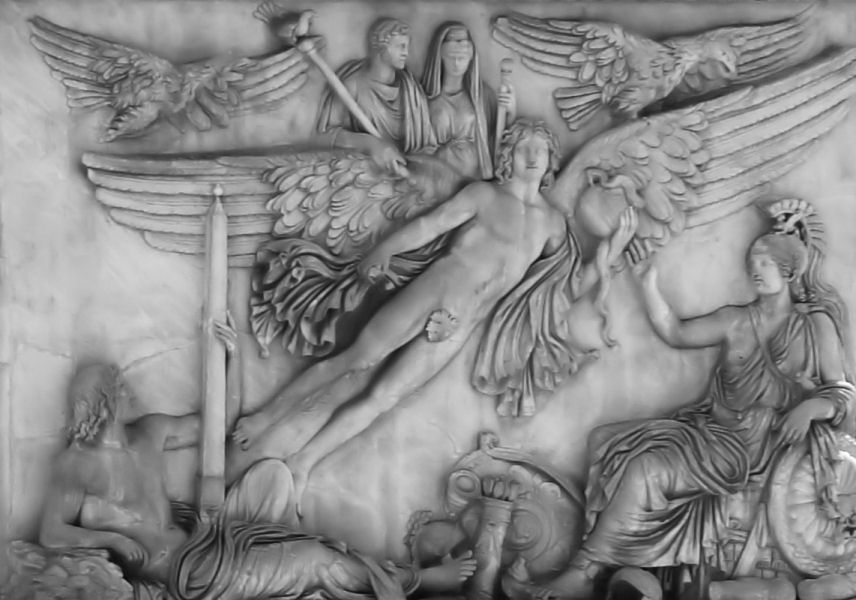
Genius of Antoninus Pius

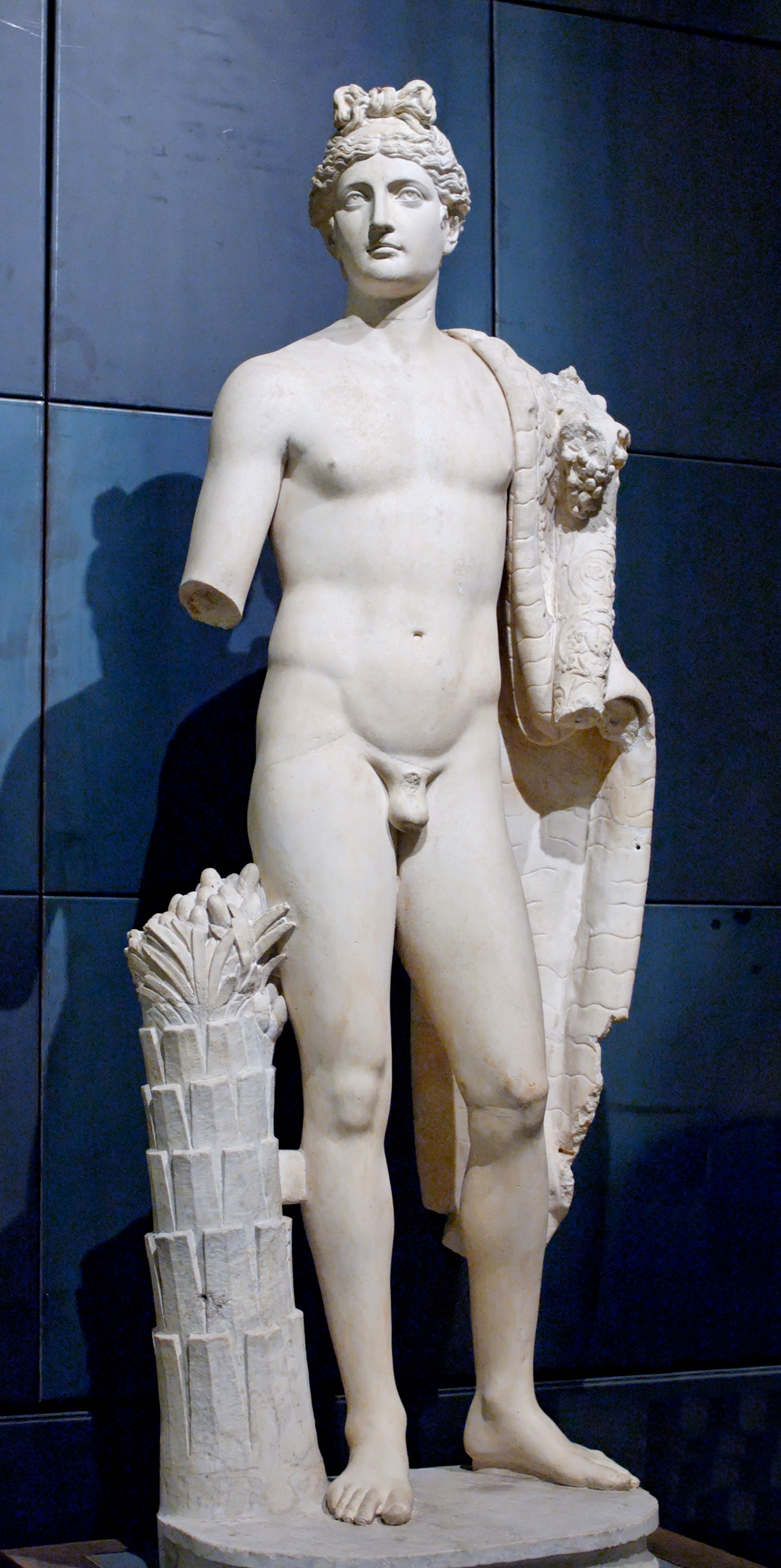
Genius of Domitian

In Roman artwork from Pompeii, the genii often appear in fourth style paintings, all dated between 62 and 79 CE, wherein they are featured alongside Lares and snakes. On one particular painting—the original context of which is uncertain—there exists two separate scenes divided by a horizontal black line. The upper area consists of two Lares standing on the sides of the mural, with garlands portrayed hanging at the top, with a genius in the middle. The overall painting depicts a pig sacrifice—it showcases a human victimarius (sacrificial assistant) leading the pig, while a tibicen (fluteplayer) performs, and a camillus (altar boy) holds a tray of offerings and two garlands. At the center, the genius is depicted performing a libation.

The painting displays a hierarchy of size: The two enslaved humans—the victimarius and the camillus—are depicted as tiny compared to the freedman tibicen, all three of whom are smaller than the divine genius and Lares. Even amongst these inhuman beings, the genius is portrayed as much smaller than the Lares, though he is situated at the center of the scene and is shown wearing more prestigious clothing, namely the toga praetexta, all of which draw the viewer's attention towards him. Nevertheless, the toga symbolically associated him with the role of the human pater familias, and his reduced size places him more on the level of the humans in the painting. Both the genius and the Lares are depicted with their weight on one foot, although the pose of the former seems much more static. He is holding a cornucopia, itself a common accoutrement connected with the genii in Roman art, and a symbol of fertility.

It is unclear exactly whom the genius is propitiating, though Flower suggests it is the Lares, since they are the largest entities in the painting and they stand at the sides, thus framing the entire scene and defining the sacred space within which the rituals occurred. The genius, being a protective spirit associated with mortal men, is naturally more closely connected with the humans and the painting, and—according to Flower—represents an idealized version of the human role in sacrifice. Flower further suggests that, by representing a model form of a Roman libation for the Lares, the genius would have allowed suppliants at this altar the ability to themselves participate in such a theoretically ideal ritual. Others have suggested that the genius is offering the libation for himself, though Flowers counters that—if this were the case—the presence and importance of the Lares would be inexplicable, and the author Censorinus explicitly states that animal sacrifices, such as that of a pig, were not offered for the genius.

Another painting from Pompeii, this one from the house of Julius Polybius, also depicts two large Lares standing beside a central altar, with accompanying tiny human figures, namely a tibicen and a camillus. Two veiled figures of identical height stand by the altar, one male and one female. The male individual hold a cornucopia, and therefore can be identified as a genius, indicating that the female figure—who wears a blue tunic draped in a red cloak—is to be understood as the Juno, the female equivalent of the genius. Collectively, according to Flower, these two images are to be understand as presenting an idealized version of the marriage between the husband and wife who resided within this house. This painting is somewhat unusual in that it contains a female figure, whereas most other similar paintings only depict the genius of the male head of the household. Moreover, in this painting, the woman is actually situated slightly closer to the altar and could therefore be interpreted as perhaps more important within the ritual, though Flower proposes that the painting was designed to convey a sense of "harmony and parity," for both individuals are depicted with roughly synchronized movements and similar statures.

==== Snakes ====
In the first Pompeian painting, the two serpents are restricted to the bottom half of the scene, a space covered in vegetation, unlike the area marked by the Lares. Within this particular scene, the snakes have their own altar, itself containing a pinecone and eggs. Other scenes, however, depict the snake wrapped around the altar by the Lares or merely moving towards it. The second painting also contains a garden space at the bottom, though the snake does not dwell there; on the contrary, it has actually burst out from the altar and coils around the altar. Flower explains the intrusion of the snake, which does not provoke any visible reaction from the other attendants, as a potentially comic detail. Typologically, the snakes in the paintings can be divided into three types. The first class consists of snakes with a viperine head and usually with smooth scales, though they are sometimes rough, and the second type includes snakes without the viperine head and always with smooth scales. Snakes of the type III variety are usually depicted crawling up a tree, and they are always exclusively found in the garden scenes, never the Lararium paintings. Both type II and type III snakes were probably modeled after real non-venomous snakes.

The snakes have been connected with the concept of the Agathos Daimon in Ancient Greek religion, which are themselves explicitly associated with the genius by Servius the Grammarian, who writes that Agathoi Daimones are, in Latin, known as the genii. However, there are stylistic differences between the Campanian snakes and the Greek Agathoi Daimones, namely that the Greek snakes are confined to only one style, which is itself viperine, and is therefore only similar to type I at Pompeii. Moreover, the Pompeian snakes lack the characteristic coil and pschent of the Greek Agathoi Daimones. Instead, the Pompeian serpents likely served merely as apotropaic devices and symbols of good fortune, a role which explicitly referenced in literature by an account from Persius's Satires wherein he describes the use of painted snakes to mark off forbidden areas. The snakes were perhaps treated as an attribute of the genius themselves, as indicated by the discovery of one bronze statuette—found near the entrance of a house—that depicts a genius with a snake wrapped around its body.

=== Winged genii ===
In room H within the villa of Publius Fannius Synistor, there exists two images of winged genii on separate sides of doorway, both of which date to around 50 BCE. The genius on the left side is clearly male, while the genius on the right side of the doorway was probably female, though it is slightly difficult to tell due to damage to the painting. Both entities carry golden platters, though the female spirit holds a tray of fruit, whereas the male genius holds a patera. Moreover, the male genius, in his right hand, clings onto a handle, which probably belonged to a jug, though the image is partially broken, rendering the original item obscure. The imagery of serveware may connect to libation offerings provided before a meal, and it also hints at wine consumption, a motif further reinforced by the presence of these images by the entranceway to the oecus, wherein resides an image of Bacchus. According to Ekserdjian, the Dionysiac element of the image is amplified by the presence of animal ears on the male genius and the ivy belt adorning the female spirit.

One winged genius appears on a coin dated to 41 BCE that depicts, on the obverse, the head of Marc Antony, and—on the reverse—a naked winged figure standing atop a globe and holding a cornucopia and a caduceus. Additionally, this figure had the head of the sun-god Helios, bedecked with protruding rays encircling the face. Stylistically, according to the classicist Lise Vogel, this coin is a predecessor of a later aureus dated to 121 from the reign of Emperor Hadrian (r. 117–138), upon which lies a nearly naked youth wearing only a mantle and holding in his right hand a zodiacal oval and in his left a globe topped by a Phoenix. This coin contained the inscribed letters SAEC AVR, referring to the idea of a saeculum aureum ("golden age"). Another winged genius appears on the column of Antoninus Pius, wherein it lies vertically across the scene, stretching from the bottom-left corner to the upper-right hand side. The genius is naked, though a piece of drapery wraps around its left arm and extends behind the spirit, fluttering in the wind, with the other end of the item grasped by the right hand of the genius. In the left hand of the genius, there rests a globe with stars, a crescent, and a zodiac band containing images of Taurus, Aries, and Pisces. Furthermore, a snake wraps itself around the globe, extending downwards and coiling over the left arm of the genius, before poking its head back up to look at the spirit's face. The head of the figure is reminiscent of depictions of Alexander the Great as Helios, insofar as it has messy strands of hair and an upward and outward gaze. Vogel once again connects this type of winged genius with the notion of a golden age, for the reign of Emperor Antoninus Pius portrayed as such by his successors Marcus Aurelius and Lucius Verus, who represented themselves as responsible for upholding the prosperity of Pius's rule.

=== Sculptures ===
One Romano-British genius sculpture consists of a 31-inch (790 mm) high relief carved from Cotswold ooltic limestone depicting a youthful, beardless figure with curly hair extending downwards towards its shoulders. It is half-naked, albeit with a piece of cloth wrapped around the lower part of the body, between his waist and his knees, a fold of which is caught in his left arm and allowed to hang at his left side. In his left hand, the figure holds a cornucopia, filled with plentiful fruit, while—in his right hand—the genius holds a patera. Beneath the patera, there are the remains of what was probably once an altar or base (cippus), around which a snake is coiled. This particular image of a genius was seemingly coopted for Christian use, perhaps because the figure was reinterpreted as Jesus Christ or a saint, and the snake envisioned as a representation of Satan laying defeated. Another genius statue, this one from Burgh-by-Sands depicts a 0.495-metre (1 ft 7.5 in) tall and 0.30-metre (1 ft 0 in) wide statue carved from local sandstone. The statue portrays the genius wearing a garment wrapped around his waist and legs, with one piece draped across his left forearm, while his left arm as a whole is covered by a mantle. This genius is shown pouring a libation from a patera, while holding a cornucopia, and—somewhat uniquely—it is wearing sandals instead of boots. Stylistically, this statue approximates the pose and clothing of classicizing Roman sculpture, though it fails to fully capture the specific details of the classical ideal—the genius and the altar tilt backwards, the toes are all of the same length, and the focus ("fireplace, hearth") atop the altar is a flat disk, without any raised rim or concave appearance as expected for classical art. Thus, this genius is not to be understood as an example of elite Roman art, but instead as a sample of popular art designed to imitate the classical style.

=== Genius populi Romani ===
Coin from Alexandria showcasing the Demos of the Romans

The image of the genius populi Romani first appears on a coin struck in the 70s BCE by Gnaeus Cornelius Lentulus Marcellinus, wherein the genius is depicted as a older, bearded male carrying a scepter over his shoulder and with his hair tied behind his head by a band. On the reverse of the coin, there is an image of a scepter alongside a wreath, globe, and a rudder, all of which collectively serve to emphasize the Roman domination of land and sea. Later portrayals of the genius populi Romani, however, depict the figure as a younger man, holding a cornucopia rather than a scepter. This artistic shift may have occurred as early as the late Republic, provided that a particular coin struck by Quintus Cassius Longinus is correctly interpreted as showcasing this type of genius. The coin depicts a youthful male figure with flowing hair wielding a scepter, which has been varyingly identified as Romulus, Bonus Eventus, or a genius. Of these theories, the third was advanced by Michael H. Crawford on the basis of a stylistic comparison with the aforementioned coin by Cornelius Lentulus.

Another late Republican coin, this one minted in 74 BCE, showcases the genius as an older man with a cornucopia. In this coin, the genius is depicted seated in a curule chair, wielding a scepter in his left hand a cornucopia in his right hand, while his right foot rests atop his globe and his left on an unidentified object. It is possible that this unidentified object is, in fact, a rudder, in which case this image is perhaps once again referencing the notion of domination over land and sea. During the first year of the reign of Emperor Vespasian (r. 69–79), a new style of coin appeared wherein the genius populi Romani was represented bareheaded and half-naked, standing before an altar while holding a patera and a cornucopia. This style remained present on some Roman coins until the early 3rd century. Another, similar style of representation first appeared by the closing years of the reign of Emperor Antoninus Pius (r. 138–161), though in this version, there was no altar and the genius held the scepter in their right hand. Between 294 and 300, during the reign of Diocletian (r. 284–305), nearly every coin minted contained an image of the genius populi Romani, perhaps as part of a desire on the part of the reigning tetrarchs to emphasize the unifying Romanitas of the Roman people.

The earliest depiction of the genius populi Romani resembles the representations of the Demos in Attic art. Later versions portrayed with a cornucopia instead the scepter found in the Greek depictions are probably due to the specifically Roman associations between the genius and fertility. In any case, the genius populi Romani was syncretized with the Greek concept of the Demos, and in coinage from the eastern part of the Roman empire, the term Demos is utilized to describe the genius. For instance, one bronze coin from Alexandria, minted during the reign of Nero (r. 54–58), contains a legend reading "ΔΗΜΟΣ ΡΩΜΑΙΩΝ" ("DĒMOS RŌMAiŌN," "Demos of the Romans"). The figure on the coin is shown semi-nude, holding a scepter in his right hand, and a cornucopia in his left hand. Whereas this particular Greek depiction adheres to Roman conventions, not all representations of the Demos of the Romans did so. One coin from Synnada, also with a legend reading "ΔΗΜΟΣ ΡΩΜΑΙΩΝ" ("DĒMOS RŌMAiŌN"), instead portrays the genius holding a phiale in his right hand and a roll in his left hand.

=== Other numismatic portrayals ===
Depictions of the genius on Roman coins include an aureus of Siscia in Croatia, 270–275 AD, featuring a standing image of the GENIUS ILLVR (Genius Exercitus Illyriciani, "Genius of the Illyrian Army") on the reverse.

== Modern-era representations ==
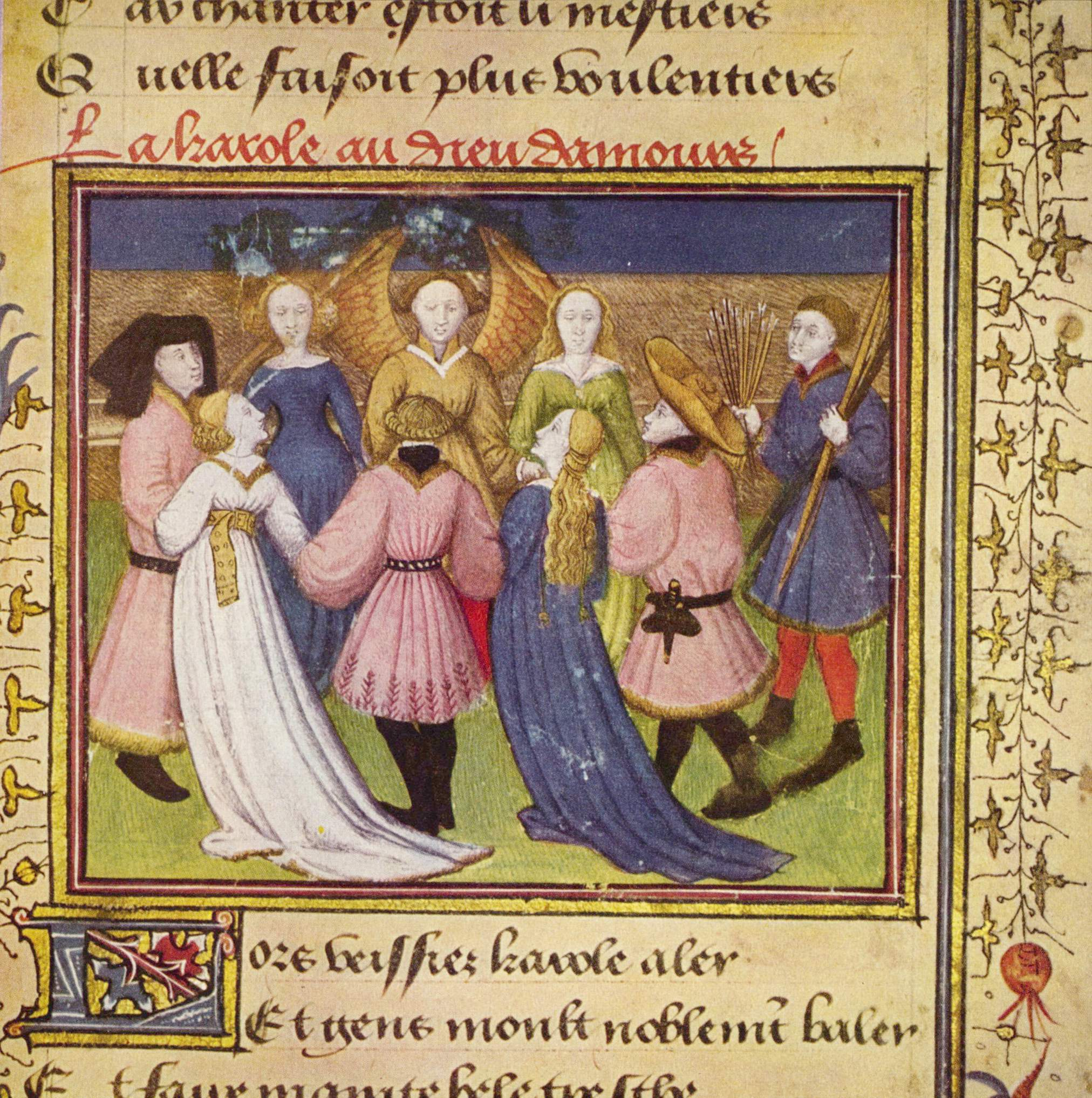
Genius of love, Meister des Rosenromans, c. 1420–1430

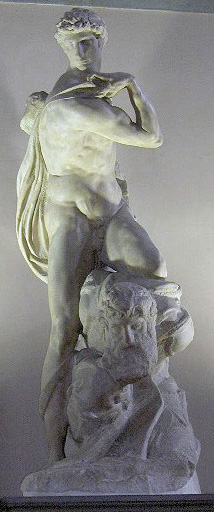
Genius of victory, Michelangelo, 1532–34

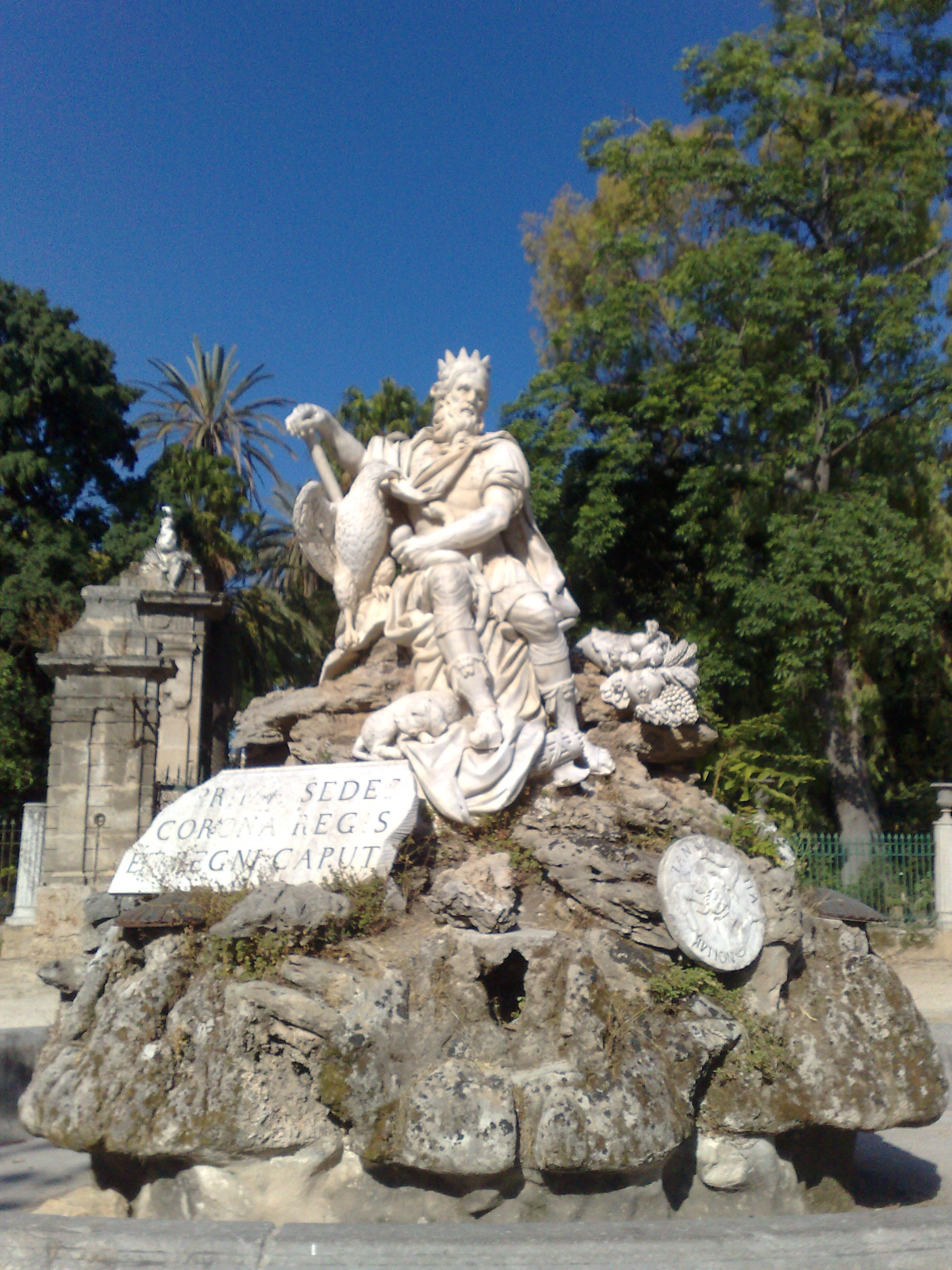
Genius of Palermo, Ignazio Marabitti, c. 1778

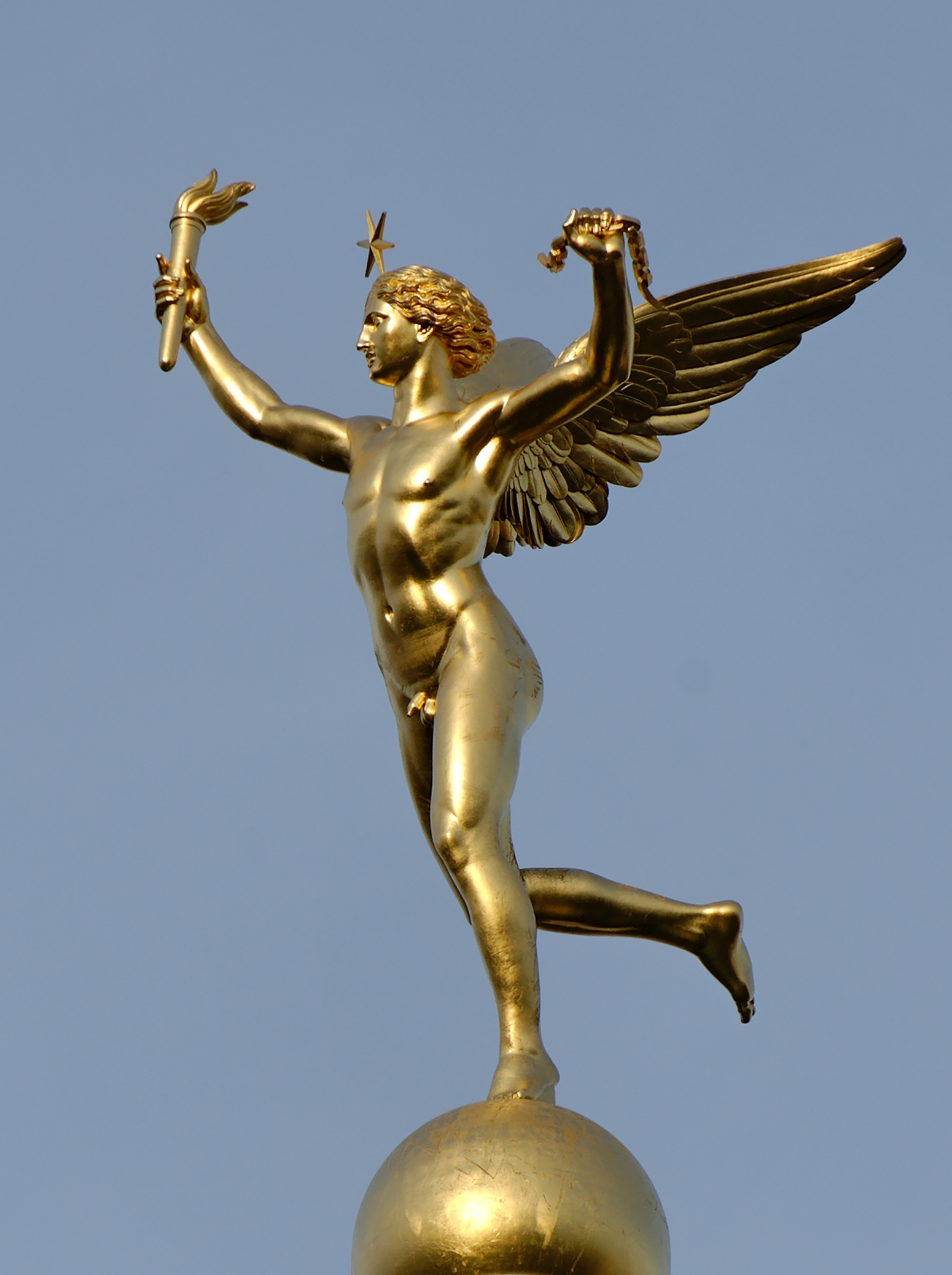
Genius of liberty, Augustin Dumont, 1840

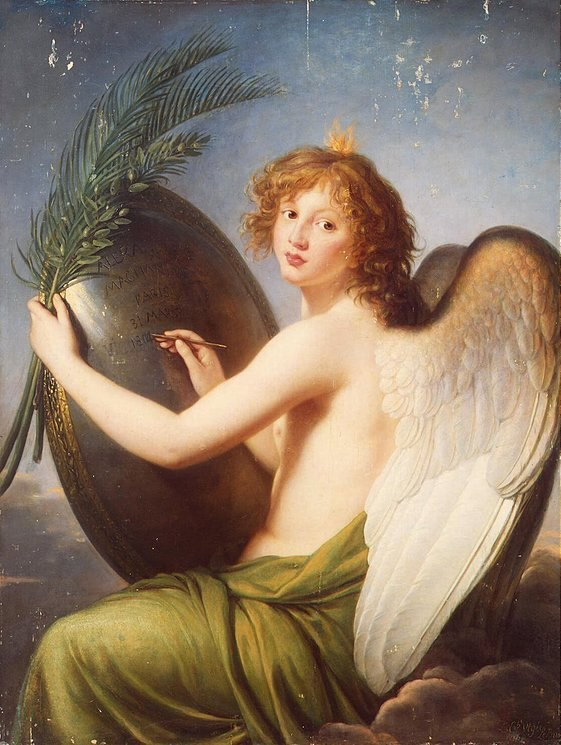
Genius of Alexander, Marie Louise Elisabeth Vigée-Lebrun, 1814

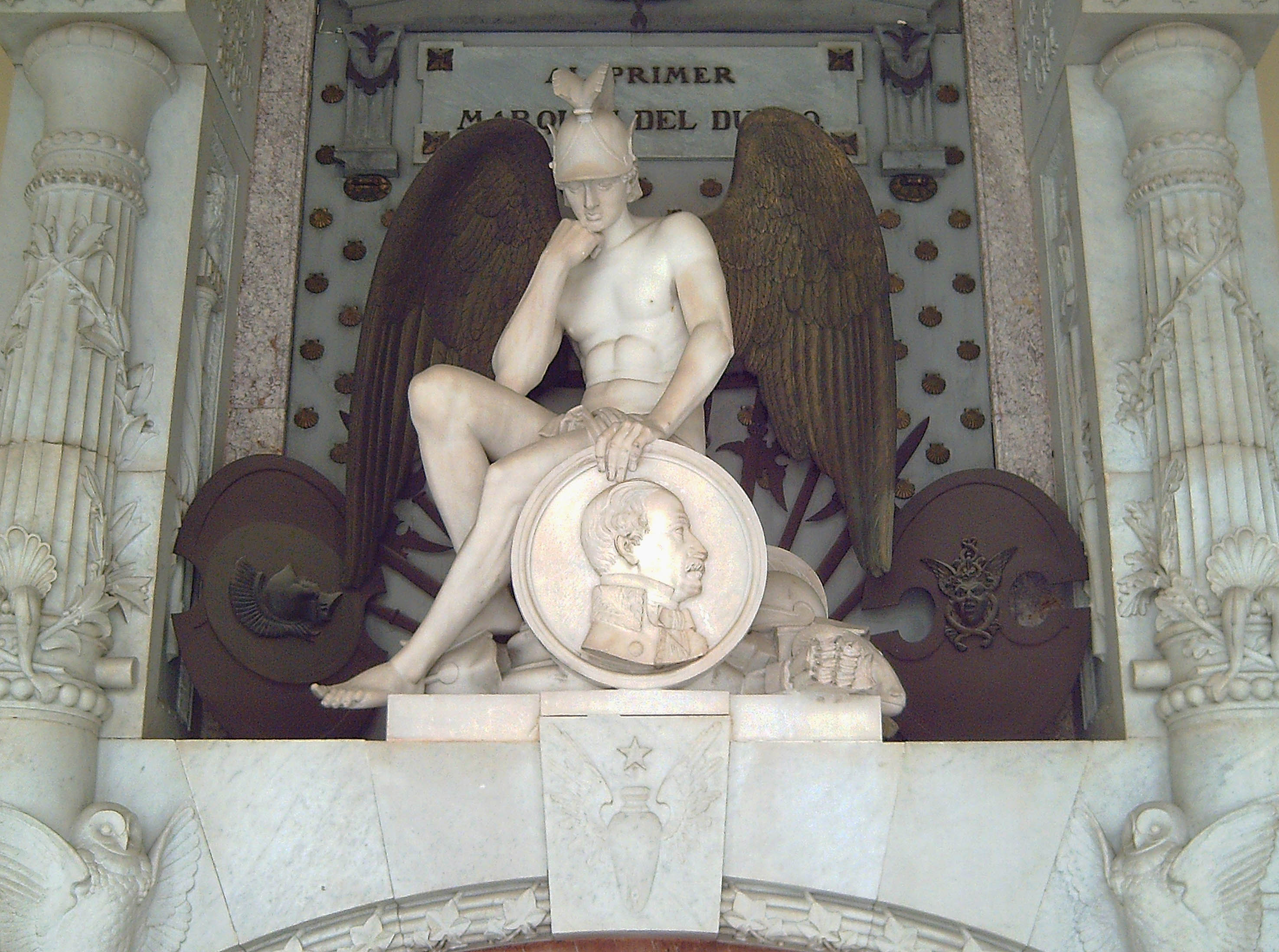
Genius of war, Elías Martín, 19th century

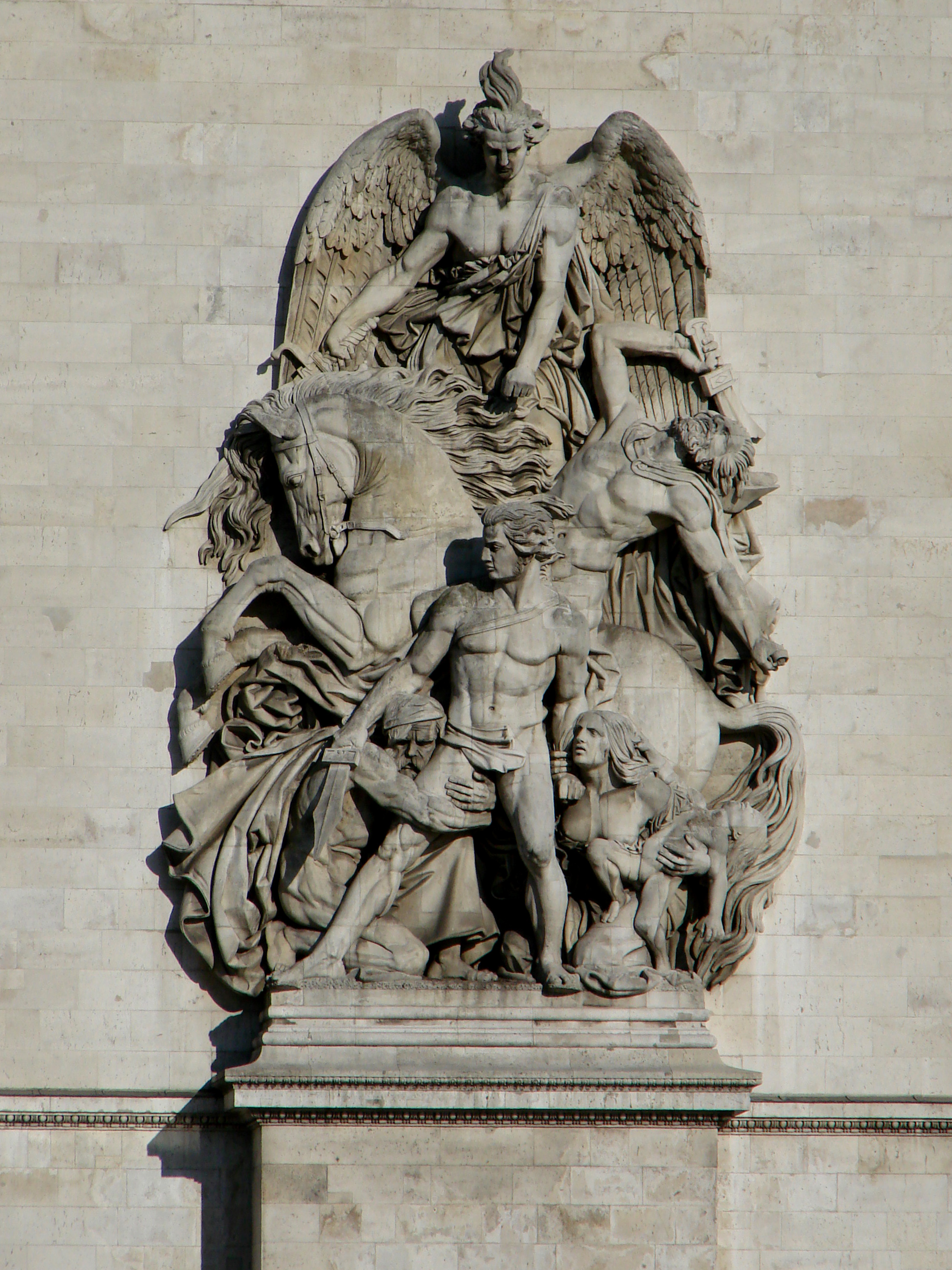
Genius of the resistance, Antoine Etex, 1833–36

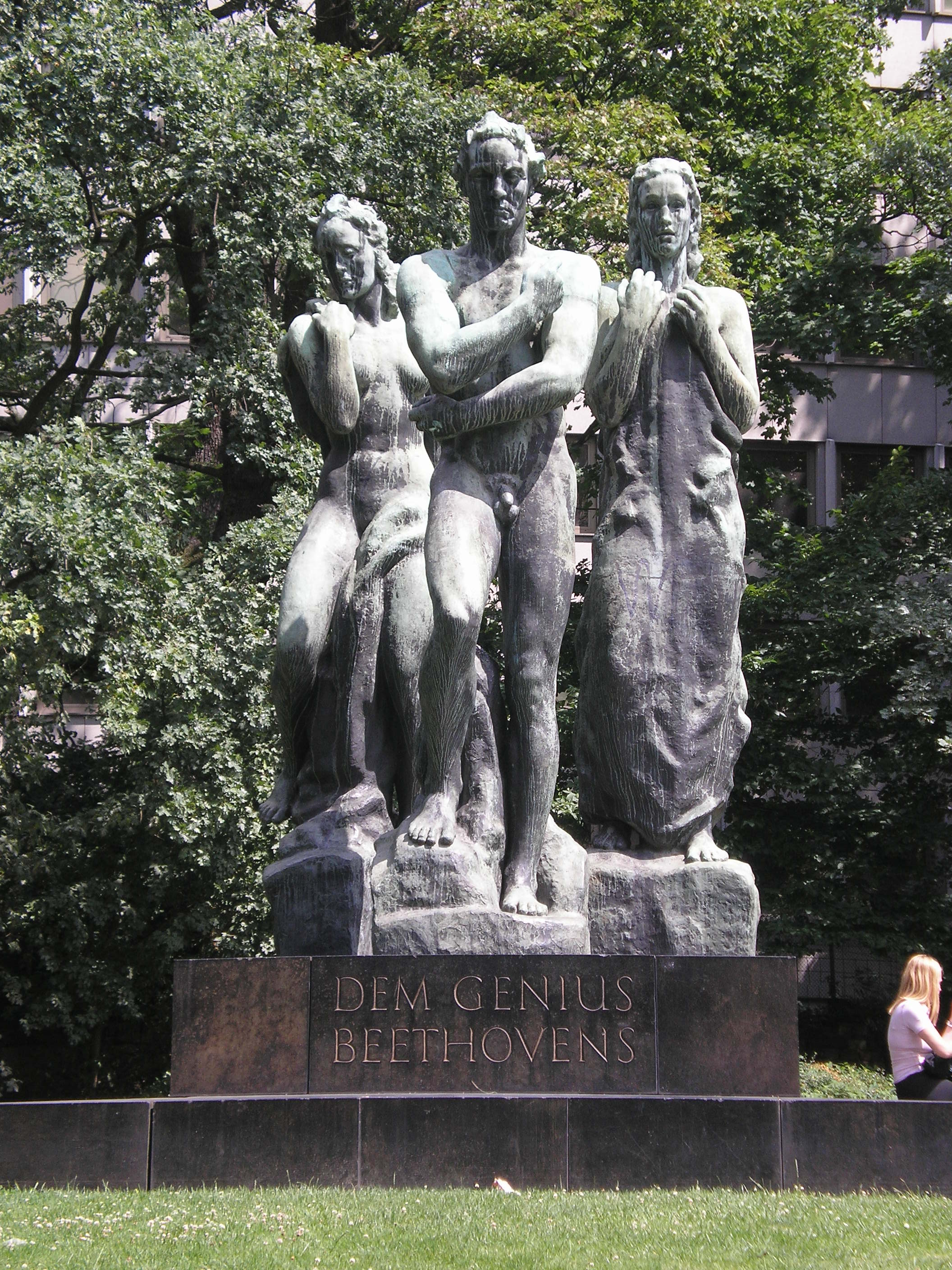
Genius of Beethoven

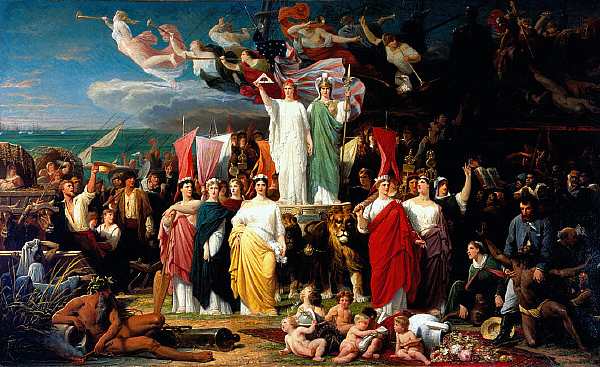
Genius of America, Adolphe Yvon, 1858

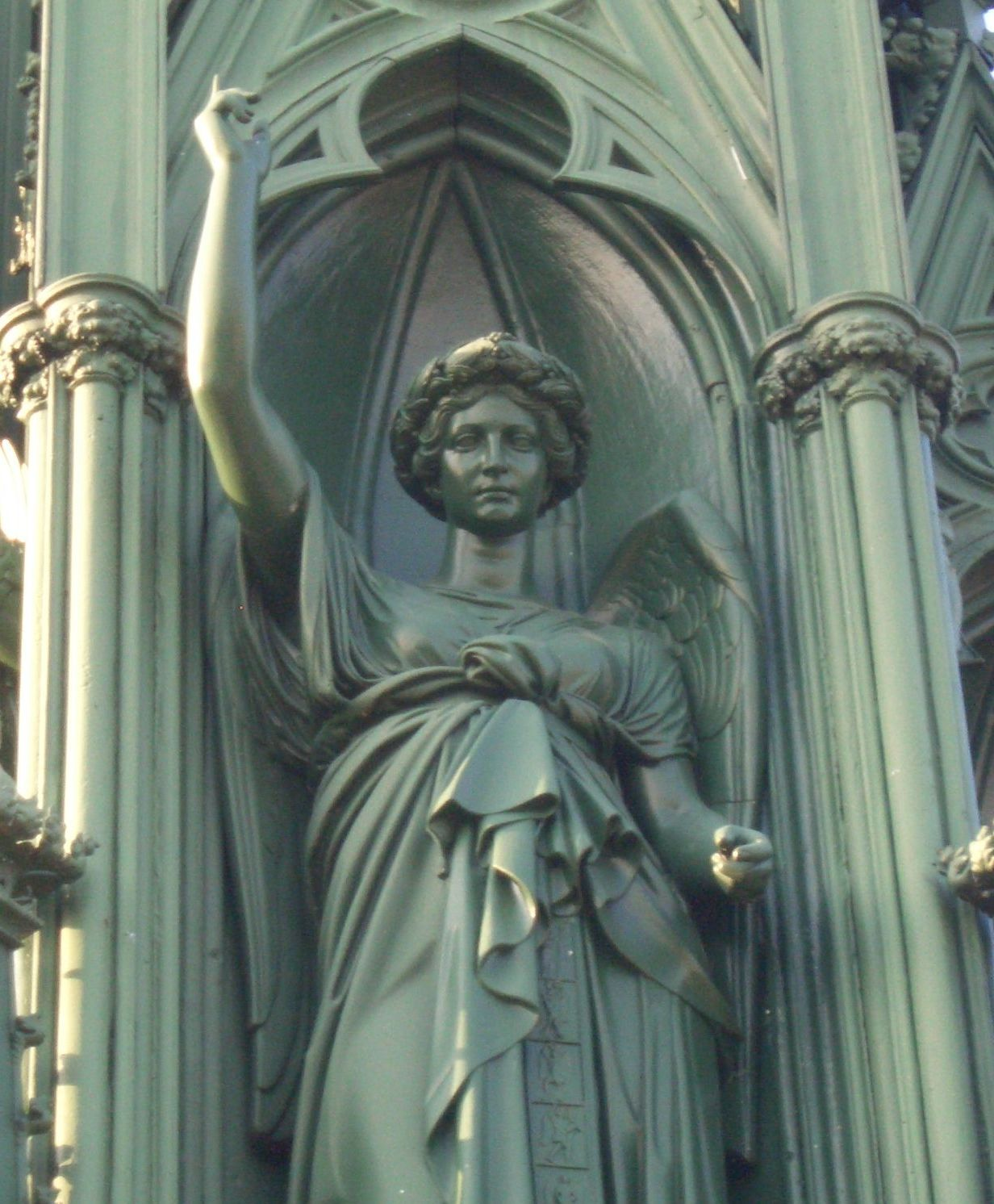
Genius of the Peace of Paris, Chr. Dan. Rauch

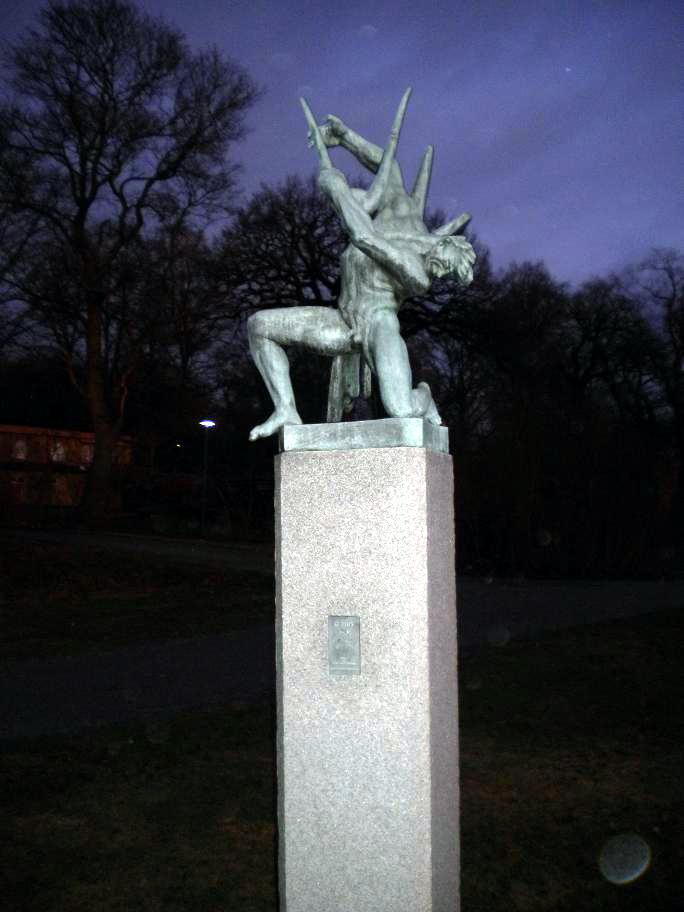
Genius, Carl Milles, 1932–40

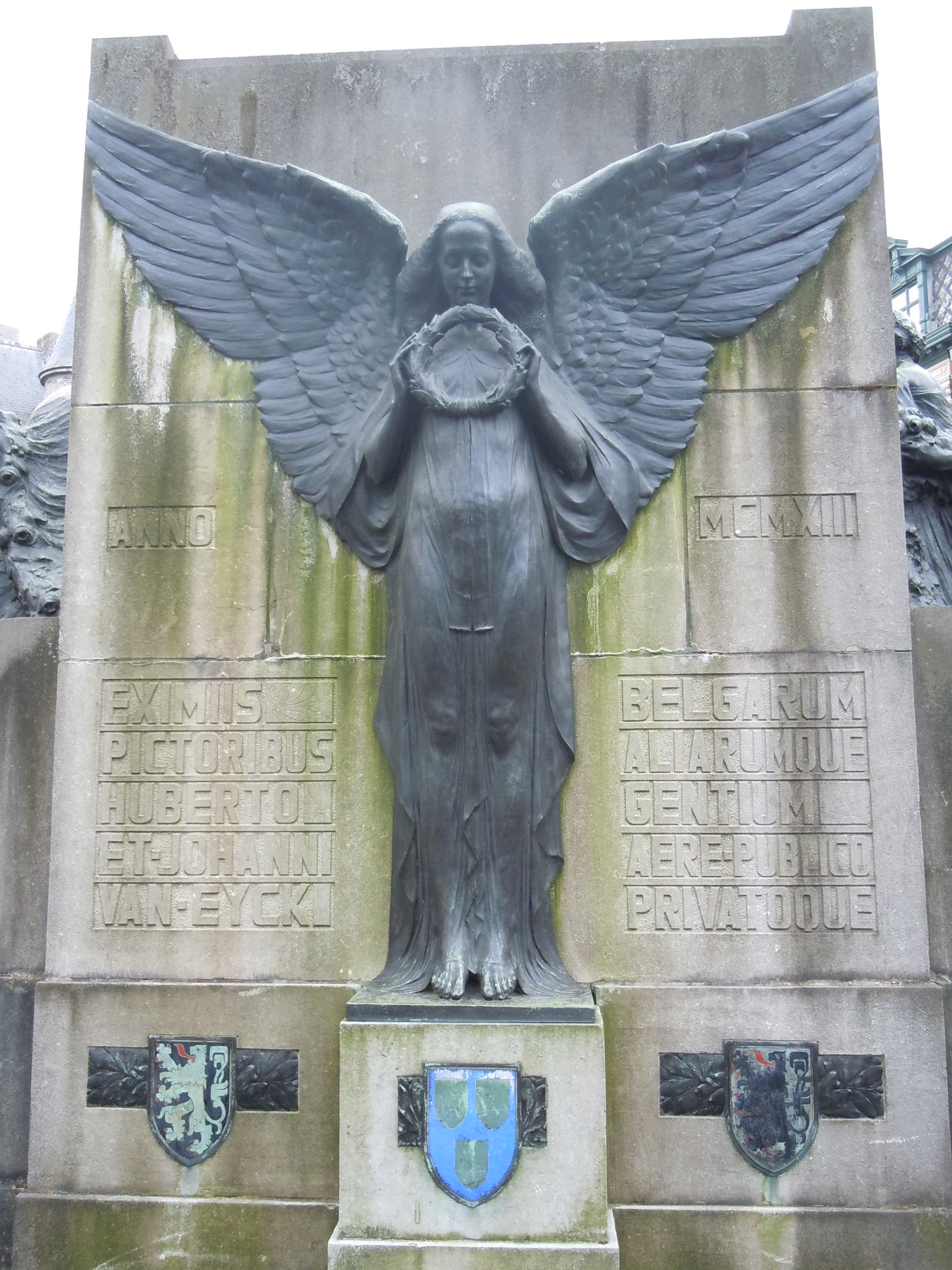
Genius of painting, Geo Verbanck, 1912, monument in honour of the Van Eyck brothers – backside, Ghent, Belgium

== See also ==
- Daemon
- Di Penates
- Holy Guardian Angel
- Jinn
- Kami
- Qareen
- Religion in ancient Rome
- Tutelary deity
- Wisdom
- Yidam
