= Popa (ancient Rome) =

In ancient Rome, the popa were individuals who helped perform the act of killing sacrificial animals as part of religious ceremonies. They are portrayed, in Roman depictions of sacrificial rites, as wielding the hammer or axe utilized to strike the animal.

== Social status ==
Popae were evidently accorded little respect in ancient Roman society, at least from the upper classes. Cicero, a 1st-century BCE Roman statesman, in his speech Pro Milone, expresses doubt that the testimony of a popa named Licinius should be trusted in court. Persius, a 1st-century CE Roman satirist, asks why he must endure hunger whilst a popa can have a fat belly, which incidentally also showcases that popae had acquired a certain level of prosperity as a social class. Similarly, Propertius, 1st-century BCE elegiac poet, seemingly denigrates the financial gains of popae, writing that they "bustle to win fresh profits." Suetonius, a 1st-century CE Roman historian, records an anecdote wherein the emperor Caligula (r. 37–41) attends a sacrificial ceremony in the garb of a popa, which—in the context of this group's low social status—perhaps serves to emphasize the willingness of the emperor to act in a manner unbecoming of his own prominence, a trait with Suetonius elsewhere highlights about Caligula.

== Female popae ==
In Roman artworks depicting sacrificial scenes, the popae are unilaterally male, yet the only surviving name of an individual popa is female. One funerary inscription from Rome dated to the imperial period mentions a freedwoman named Critonia Philema, who is described as the "popa de insula." It is not entirely clear what the phrase "de insula" means in this context: It possibly indicates that she worked on an island ("insula"), perhaps the Tiber Island, or it might refer to a city block, which were also called insulae. It Roman literature, the term popa exclusively denotes the profession of sacrificial slaughterers, naturally indicating that Philema herself fulfilled this role. However, it is also possible that the word popa had a different meaning in epigraphy than in literature, at least when used in tandem with the sequence "de insula." The classicist Emily Hemelrijk suggests that she may have overseen the selling or upkeep of sacrificial animals or perhaps sold their meat. In support of this theory, Hemelrijk compares the role of Clodia Nigella, a priestess of Ceres also recorded in an epigraphic text, who is described on her funerary stele as "porcaria publica" ("public pig-keeper"), which may indicate that she helped manage the sows that were sacrificed as part of the rituals for the cult of Ceres. However, the lack of any other inscriptions containing the word popa prevents any further examination of the meaning of this term is specifically epigraphic contexts. Another individual named Quintus Critonius Dassus is also mentioned in the funerary text of Philema, and his role is likewise unclear: He may have been the husband of Philema, yet it is also possible that he was the owner of the apartment block in which she worked.
