= Victimarius =

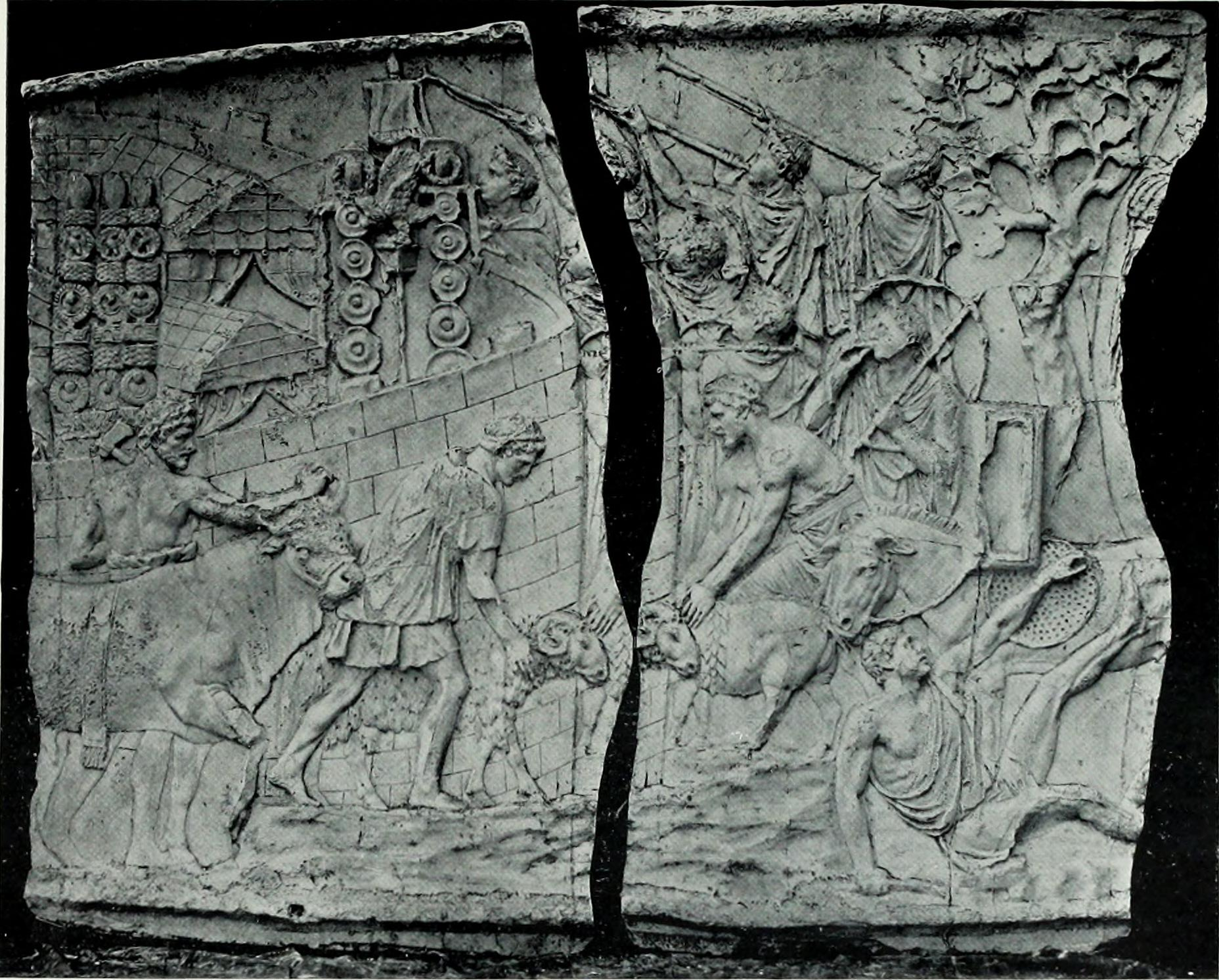
Victimarii on a slab in the Roman Forum

The victimarius was a Roman slave or freedman who helped perform the actual killing and handling of the animal during animal sacrifice. In depictions of Roman animal sacrifice, the victimarius is identifiable by his attire, size, and tools he carries. The presence of the victimarius shows the importance of slaves in Roman religion and in the social hierarchy of the Roman world.

== Depictions ==
The victimarius was commonly depicted as a shirtless figure, leading the animal—typically a bull, pig, or goat—to the altar in preparation for the sacrifice. Most often the victimarius was pictured with two to three other slaves whose jobs were also to assist in the ritual process. The others are the popa, cultrarius, and a third unnamed individual. The role of the victimarius was to hold the head of the animal down whilst waiting for the stunning of the animal. The popa can be identified by the weapon he carries, typically either a hammer or an axe. In the depictions on Trajan’s column and the sarcophagus of Mantua, popae are clearly visible standing with an axe held above their heads ready to stun the animal. The cultrarius is pictured with a triangular knife and crouched down beneath the head of the animal ready to slit the throat directly after the popa stuns the animal. The third individual is typically a flute player (tibicen) or an attendant holding a jug or bowl to carry a libation.

== Functions ==
The victimarius’s primary job was to lead and control the animal during the procession and ritual up until the killing of the animal. They were most often used in public rituals and sometimes private rituals. To maintain proper ritualistic traditions and ensure the success of the sacrifice the animal must willingly accept its fate as a sacrifice and must not show signs of struggle. This is a large task for a single person to handle, but it was crucial to the victimarius because failing could lead to bad omens and possible action against them from their masters. To aid in this procedure specific tools were used to ensure the most efficient means of execution. The popae would have a choice between using a hammer or an axe to stun the animal. The larger animals were typically stunned with hammer, which is more common in depictions because bulls where the main sacrifice in public ritual imagery. The axe would be used on smaller animals because they required less force to stun, but it might be used with larger ones as well. The triangular knife of the cultrarius had to be kept sharp enough to kill the animal quickly enough to prevent the agony from the killing.

The victimarius was an important figure in religious animal sacrifice whose actions dictated the success and failure of the rituals. They were slaves of elite members of society and exercised their position of importance as a status symbol within the slave class. From the depictions and interpretation of the victimarius it is possible to understand their influence and prestige despite being part of the slave class. Animal sacrifice processions and rituals demonstrate the social hierarchy between gods and humans, elites and slaves. An example of the practices used by elites and emperors to reinforce these hierarchical ideas are in the reliefs of animal sacrifice on the Ara Pacis Augustae. On one side of the Ara Pacis the relief depicts Aeneas with his slave attendants leading a sow to the altar. This mythical scene further details the victimarius performing his duties for public sacrifice for elite members of Roman society, therefore, also showing their importance within realm of religious animal sacrifice. In many reliefs the gods are portrayed in the largest and most visible part of the images, seconded by the elite members of society, and finally the smallest and least visible the slaves. This is a systematic way the elite members of society used to ensure people understood that the victimarius was indeed a slave and was beneath the gods and elites. However, their depiction on public sculptural reliefs ensured that the victimarius was seen as a superior slave within the class of slaves. Thus, detailing the hierarchy in Rome stretched deeper than it looks like on the surface.

== See also ==
- Religion in ancient Rome
- Social class in ancient Rome
