= Villa Boscoreale =

Any of several Roman villas discovered in the district of Boscoreale, Italy

Villa Regina at Boscoreale
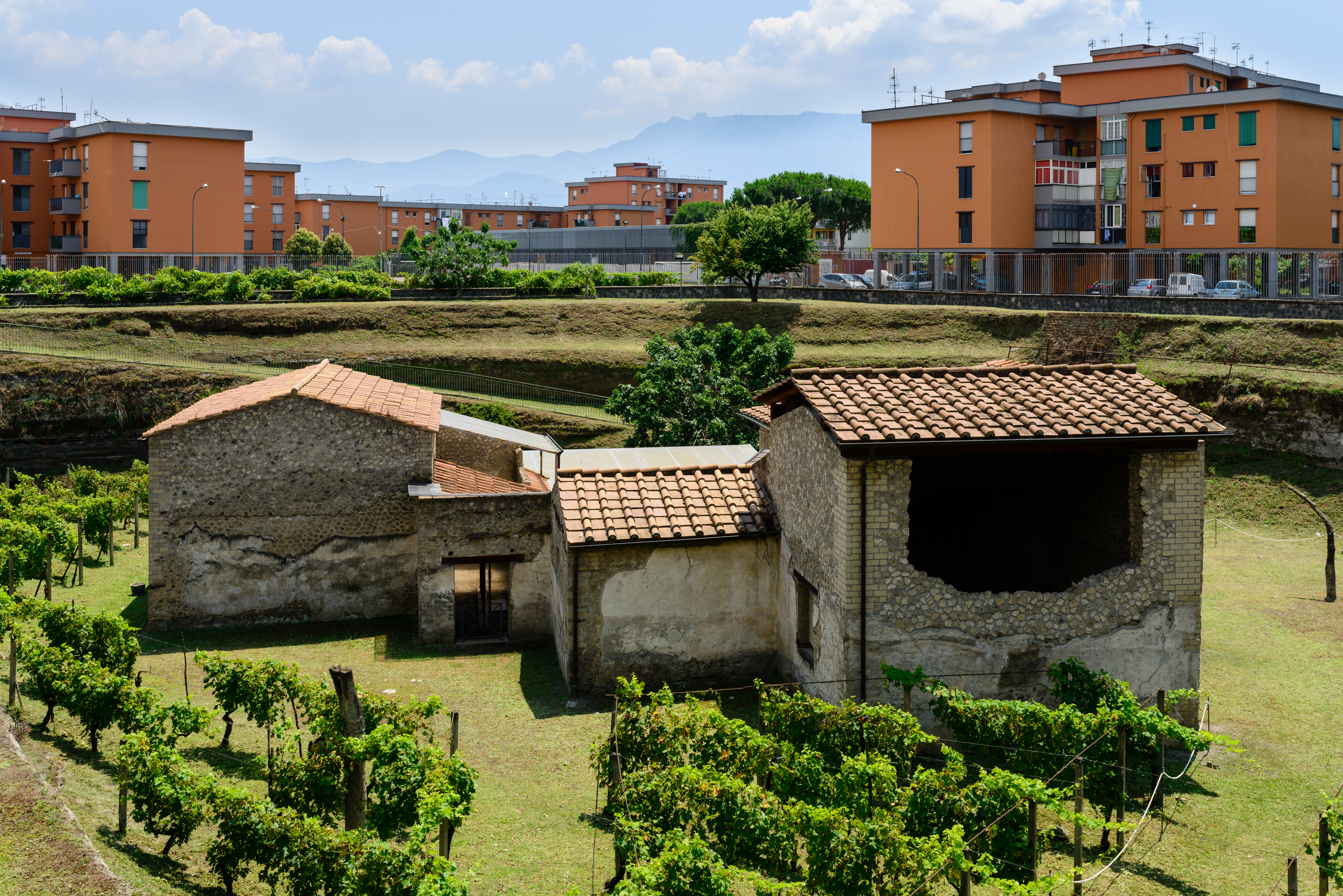
- Villa Regina, view from above
- Interactive map of Villa Regina at Boscoreale
- 40.761389°N 14.471389°E
- Type: Dwelling
- Location: Boscoreale, Province of Naples, Campania, Italy
- Region: Magna Graecia

Site notes
- Management: Soprintendenza Speciale per i Beni Archeologici di Pompei, Ercolano e Stabia
- Website: Sito Archeologico di Boscoreale (in Italian)

Villa Boscoreale is a name given to any of several Roman villas discovered in the district of Boscoreale, Italy. They were all buried and preserved by the eruption of Mount Vesuvius in 79 AD, along with Pompeii and Herculaneum. The only one visible in situ today is the Villa Regina, the others being reburied soon after their discovery. Although these villas can be classified as "rustic" (villae rusticae) rather than of otium due to their agricultural sections and sometimes lack of the most luxurious amenities, they were often embellished with extremely luxurious decorations such as frescoes, testifying to the wealth of the owners. Among the most important finds are the exquisite frescoes from the Villa of Publius Fannius Synistor and the sumptuous Boscoreale Treasure of the Villa della Pisanella, which is now displayed in several major museums.

In Roman times this area, like the whole of Campania, was agricultural despite its proximity to cities including Pompeii, and specialised in wine and olive oil.

Information on, and objects from, the villas can also be seen in the nearby Antiquarium di Boscoreale.

== Other Villas in Boscoreale ==
Many other Roman villas were discovered in the vicinity, often by "treasure" hunters towards the end of the 19th century after which they were reburied, including notably the villas:

- in "d'Acunzo property", Piazza. Stazione FF.SS.
- of N. Popidius Florus, from which frescoes were taken
- in via Casone Grotta (found in 1986)
- of M. Livius Marcellus
- of fondo Prisco
- of Asellius
- in contrada Giuliana, Fondo Zurlo.
- in contrada Cività, Fondo Brancaccio
- of Piazza. Mercato, Proprietà Cirillo
- in contrada Centopiedi-al Tirone, Proprietà Vitiello

== Villa Regina ==
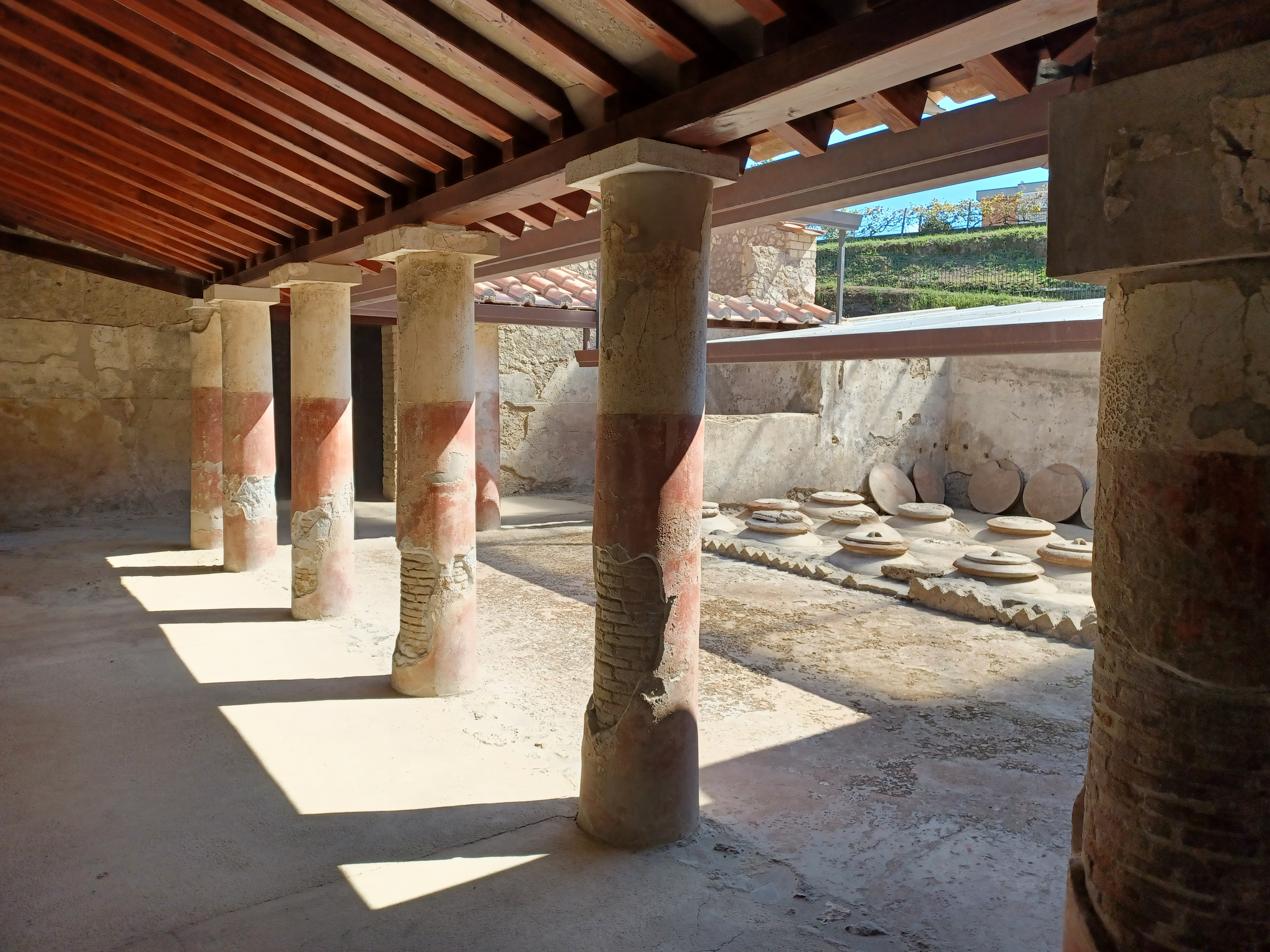
Villa Regina interior view

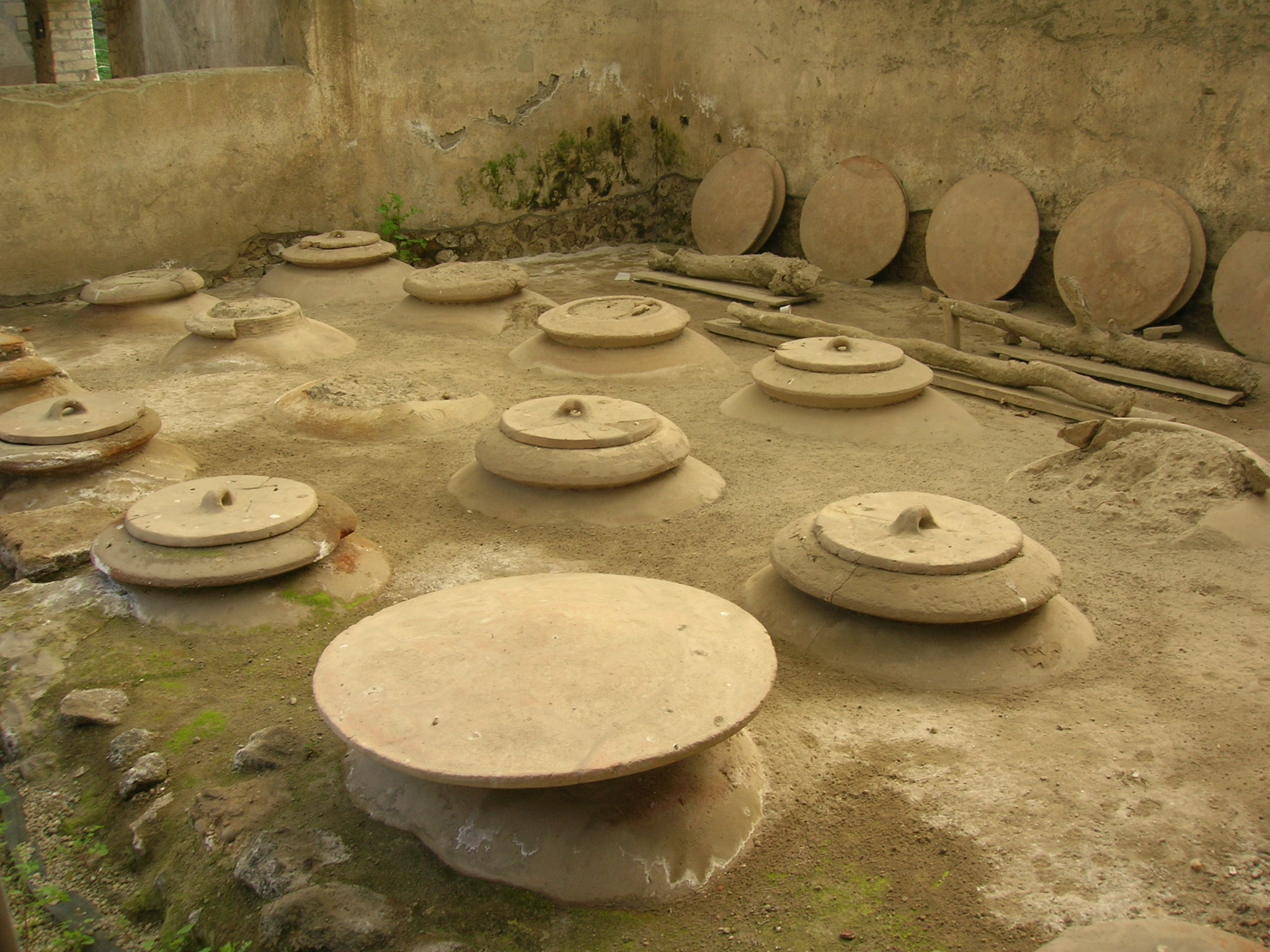
The wine cellar with dolia

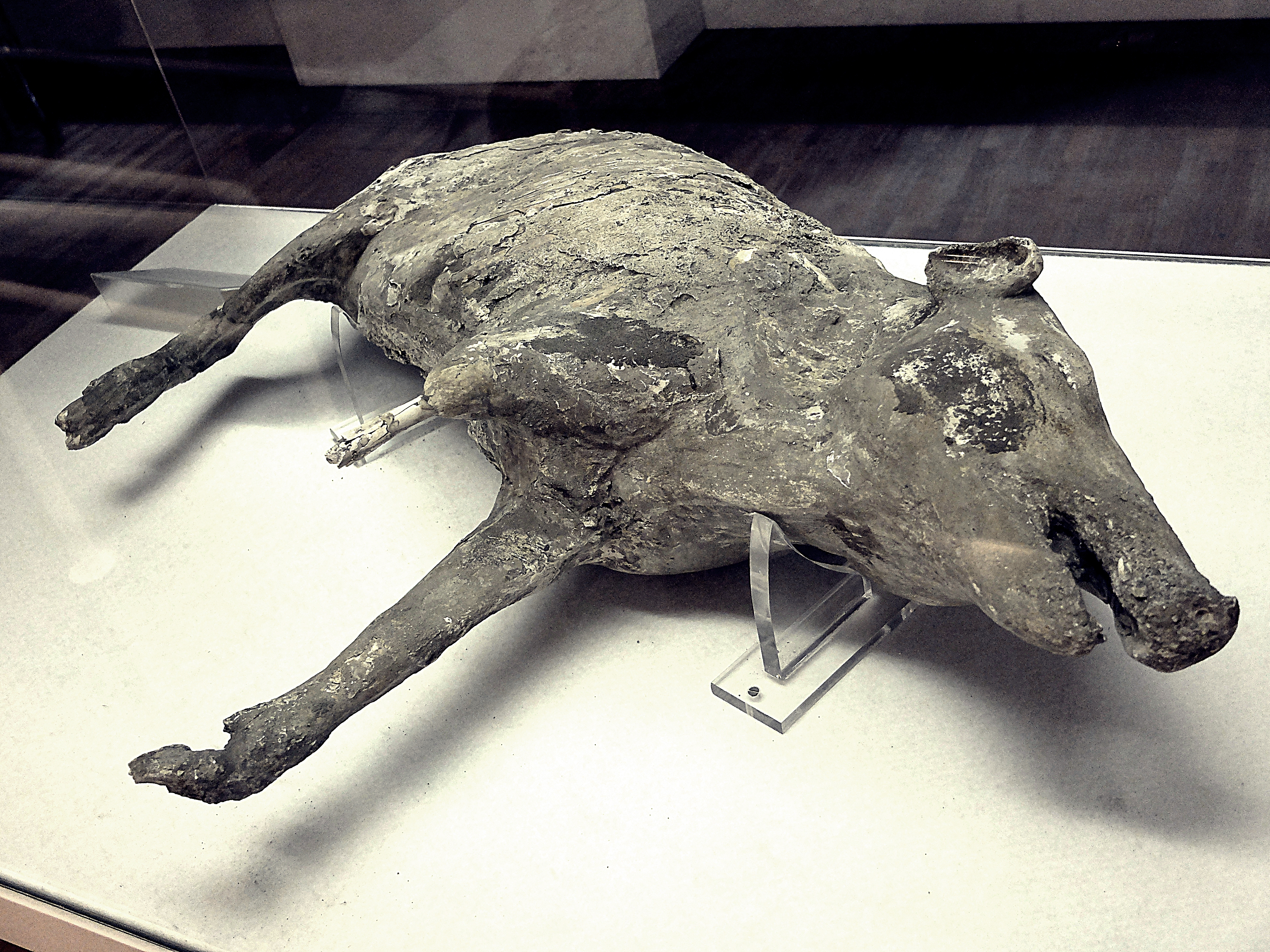
Pig found in a room of the villa Regina

This rustic villa was discovered more recently, in 1977, buried under approximately 26 feet (about 8 meters) of compressed volcanic ash and material from pyroclastic flow, later topped by material from daily activity through the centuries. Unlike the villas plundered and reburied by treasure hunters, Villa Regina was treated as an archaeological discovery and therefore has been preserved in its complete state. The villa is a comfortable working farm rather than a luxurious estate that others nearby were. Nonetheless, an elegant central courtyard is colonnaded on three sides with columns of red and white stucco.

Large quantities of pottery and farm implements were found. Plaster casts of the original entrance doors were made from the hollow spaces left. A plaster cast of a pig found here and killed in the catastrophe was also made.

It also includes preserved parts of a wine press. Near the center of the villa is the wine cellar in which 18 dolia, of total capacity 10,000 liters, were buried for storing the must from the adjoining press.

An unusual find was an oil lamp dating from the 3-5th c. AD showing that the place was tunnelled into in the later Roman era.

=== Plants at Villa Regina ===
Pollen analysis conducted at Villa Regina identified various species of cultivated plant life. Tree varieties included Birch, Hazelnut, Cypress, Ash, Walnut, Pine and Olive. Flowers at the Villa included Anemone, Borage, Dianthus, Amaranth, Aster, Sedge, Geranium, Buttercup, Mallow. Pollen samples additionally confirmed the cultivation of grapes at Villa Regina, likely pressed into wine on site. The holes in the ground left by the roots of the Roman vines were found and vines have again been planted in them.

== Villa of P. Fannius Synistor ==
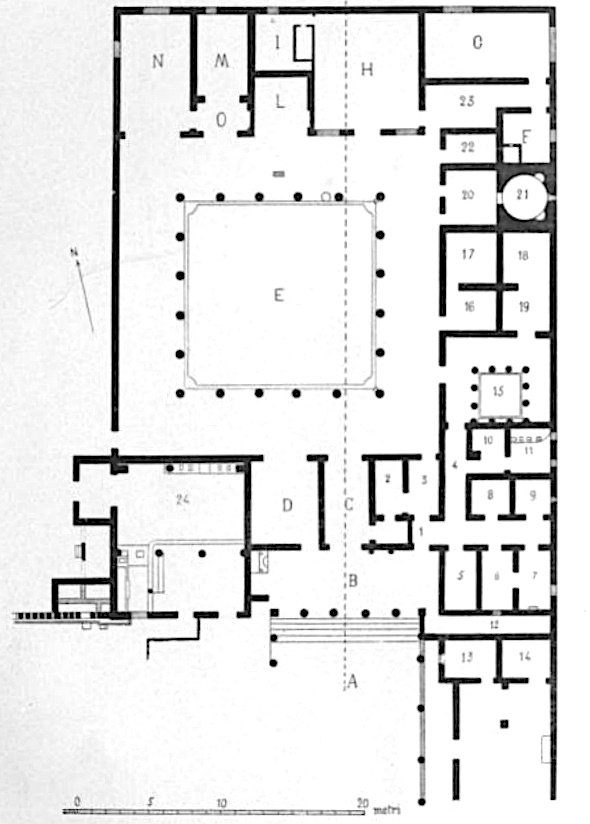
Plan of Villa of P. Fannius Synistor

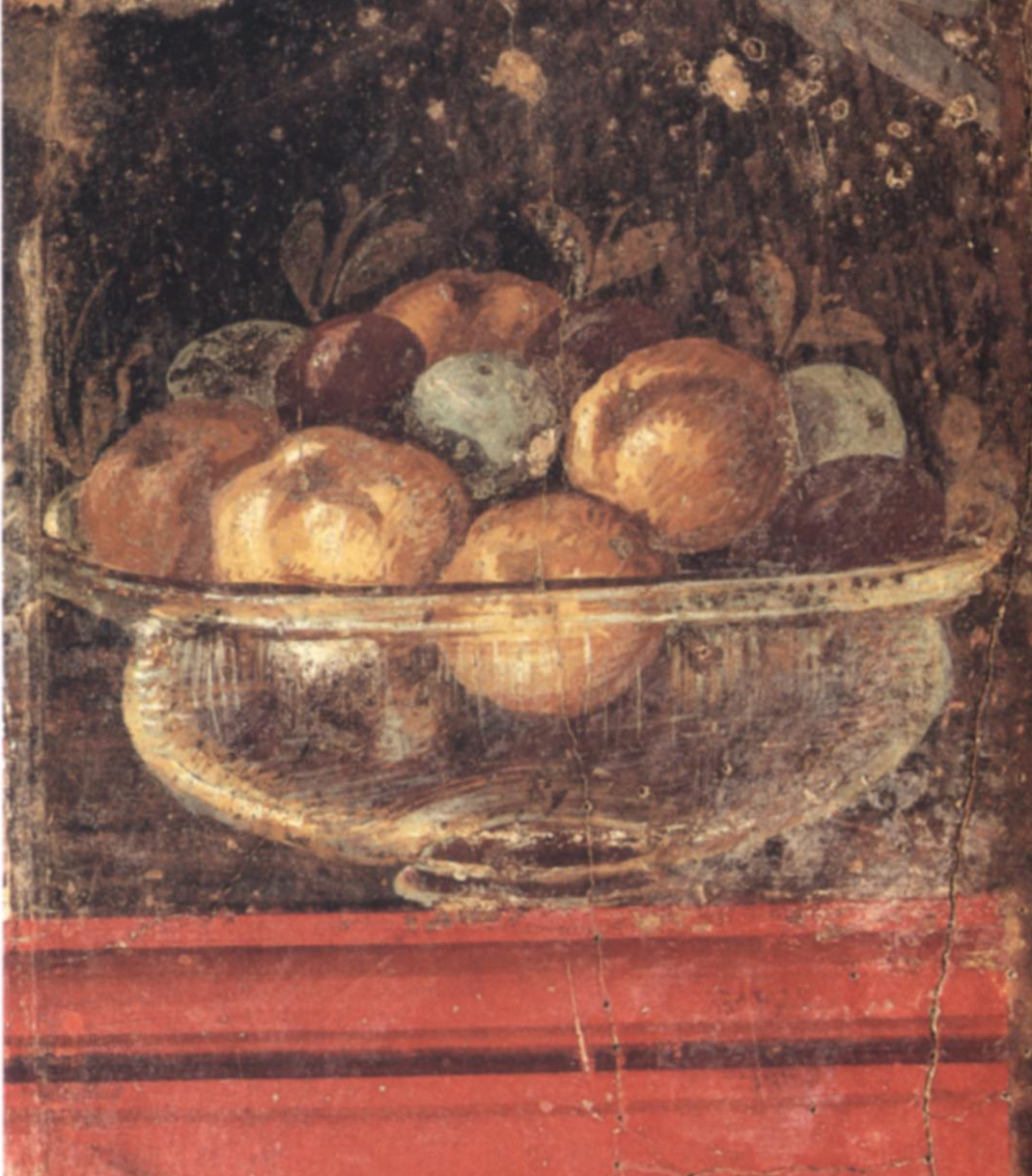
Transparent glass bowl of fruit. Detail from wall painting in Bedroom M of the Villa of P. Fannius Synistor

Although the villa was of relatively modest size compared to others in the area and had no atrium, pool or sculpture collection, its frescoes were exceptional in their beauty and quality.

Evidence in tablets and graffiti shows that the house was probably built around 40-30 BC. The villa was privately discovered, excavated, partially dismantled and reburied in 1900.

The villa had three stories, complete with a bath suite and an underground passage to a stable and agricultural buildings, the latter not excavated. The central ground floor of the living quarters consisted of over thirty rooms or enclosures surrounding a peristyle. The building featured an impressive main entrance approached by five broad steps leading to a colonnaded forecourt rather than the typical atrium.

Ownership of the villa has been contested. While there is no doubt P. Fannius Synistor did reside there, excavated bronze tablets show another name, that of Lucius Herennius Florus. Many things were marked with seals in ancient Rome to indicate possession. It is believed that since the tablet with the letters "L. HER. FLO" on it was found inside the villa, it must serve as a mark of villa ownership. These two are the only confirmed owners in the early 1st century BC and 1st century AD, though there may have been earlier owners.

=== Art ===
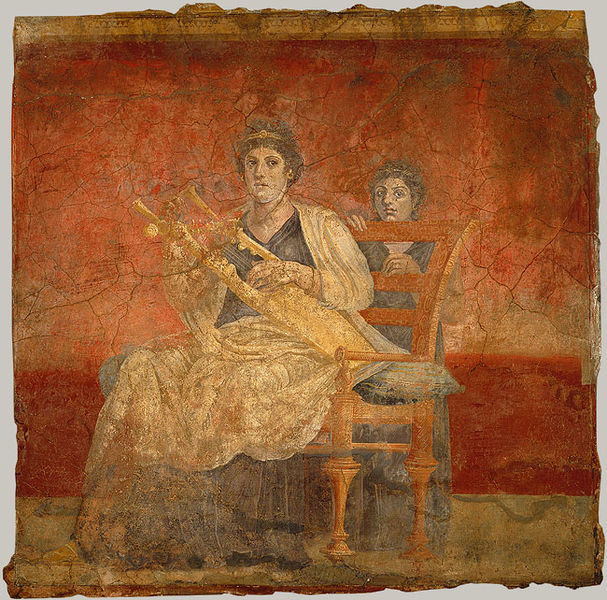
Wall fresco of a seated woman with a kithara, 40-30 BC, from the Villa Boscoreale of P. Fannius Synistor; Late Roman Republic, but most likely representing Berenice II of Ptolemaic Egypt wearing a stephane (i.e. royal diadem) on her head

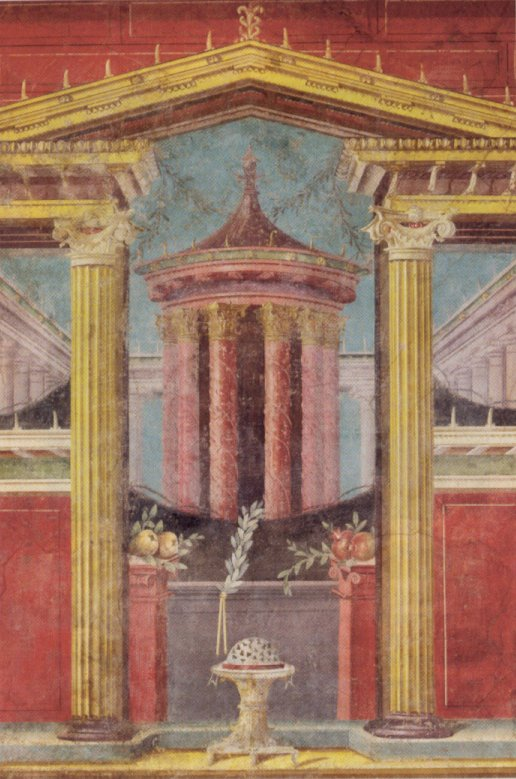
Roman fresco from Boscoreale, Metropolitan Museum of Art

The Villa is most notable for its works of art, especially its highly skilled buon fresco paintings, said to be the highest quality Roman frescoes ever found and which are now scattered around the world after being auctioned following removal.

Most of the figures in the frescoes have characteristics of Greek Hellenism or Classicism. For instance, those found in the living room appear to be depictions of either philosophers, such as Epicurus, Zeno or Menedemus, or possibly old kings, like King Kinyras of Cyprus. Similarly, the bedrooms of the Second Style also evoke Hellenistic qualities, such as are seen at the Tomb of Lyson or at Kallikles. At a time when the Roman Republic was ending and classicism somewhat fading, this is considered as an interesting comment on style and taste. Seemingly, Greek representations in the home were considered acceptable, even admired and sophisticated. The images survived the quick succession of Vesuvian cataclysms because of the skill of the fresco work and the absence of organic materials such as indigo, murex purple, red madder among its pigments. The reddening of some of its yellow ochre shows temperatures to have exceeded 300 °C.

The Metropolitan Museum of Art, together with King's College, London, is building a virtual model of the Villa, linking the scattered frescoes, based on the notes and plan drawn at the time of excavation by archaeologist Felice Barnabei (1902), photographs taken of the excavation, the research of Phyllis W. Lehmann (1953) and axonometric drawings of the plan, locating the images on the walls, by Maxwell Anderson (1987).

=== Metropolitan Museum cubiculum reconstruction ===
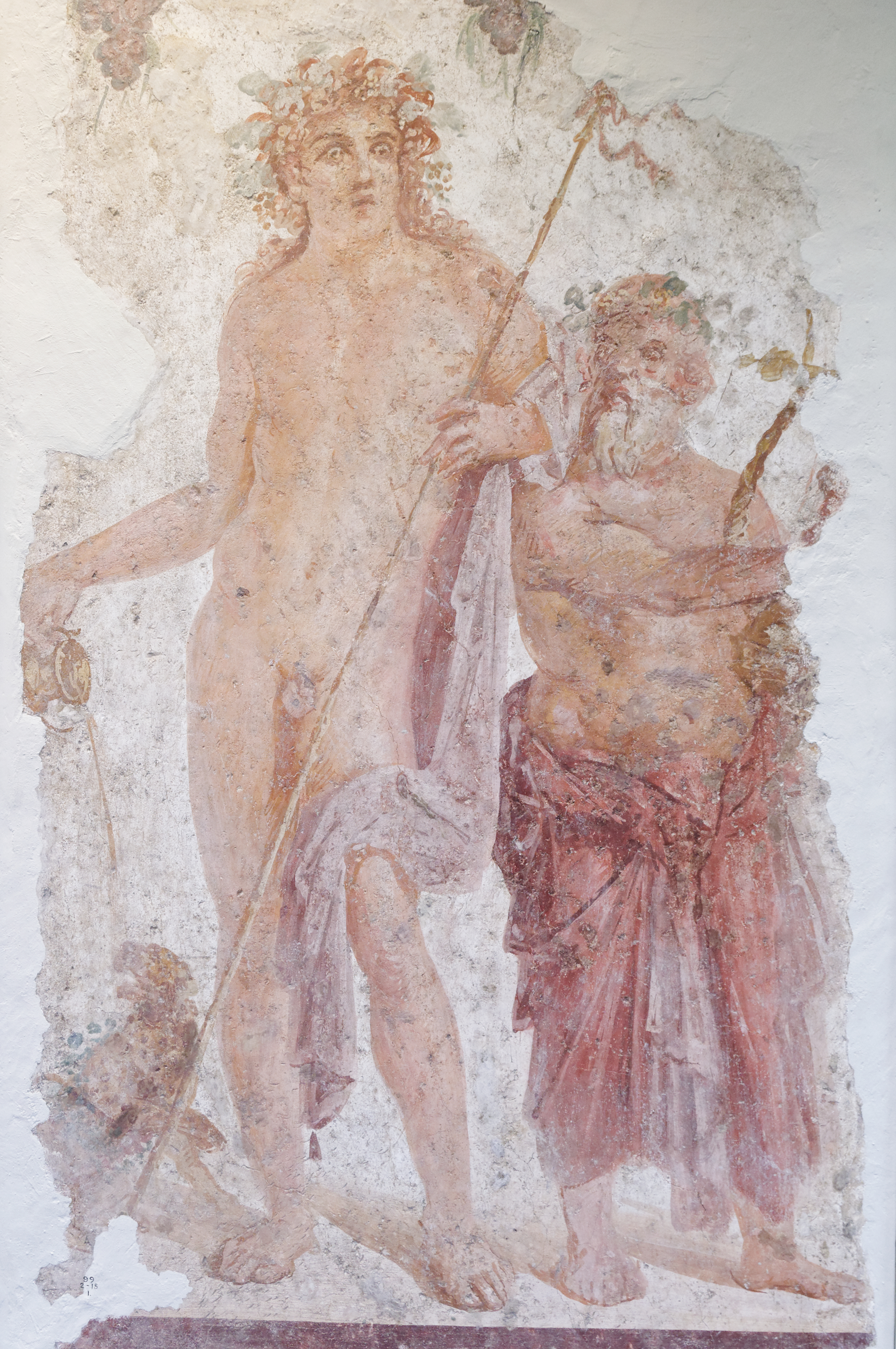
Bacchus and Silenus, British Museum

The fullest reconstruction from original frescoes at present is of a bedroom (cubiculum diurnum), one of the holdings of the Metropolitan Museum since 1903, and since 2007 a feature of the new Roman Gallery. It consists of most of a newly cleaned and reconstructed set of walls entirely painted in highly accomplished fresco. These spacious Roman II Style murals represent their walls as open above socle or dado height, except for the architraves above and a few columns that, together with those other features, frame vividly coloured architectural views of buildings, columns, landscape, garden scenes, religious statues, beyond, emphasizing expansion and grandeur, but including no humans and only a few birds on the short, window wall. This is also the technique in other unreconstructed rooms. For example, In another bedroom, known as Room M, the frescoes depict columns that appear to expand into another room, giving the sense of a much larger, almost unending, space. The facing long walls (19 ft or 5.8 m) of the Metropolitan cubiculum are mirror images of each other, possibly by transfer, with variations. In addition, each is divided into four panels by painted columns.

Distance in these paintings is built up through a series of orthogonal architectural surfaces, and indicated by overlap occlusion, foreshortening, diminution, pronounced aerial perspective, but without consistent vanishing points. Modelling is indicated by side-shading with slight, selective cast shadow. Pompeian red in front planes, contrasting with the blue tone of the fainter, further planes, provides an additional effective cue for depth. The room had one, north-facing, outside window, through which pyroclastic flows from Vesuvius appear to have entered. As part of the sophisticated depictive scheme, the dado or lower parts of the walls are depicted as themselves, but in First Style. Ledges and niches there show near objects: "metal and glass vases on shelves and tables appearing to project out from the wall", playfully belying the common impression that perspective is always for depicting recession from the picture plane. In other parts of the Villa there are brightly coloured non-figurative walls, in First Style, some of which are on display at the Metropolitan Museum of Art and the Louvre Museum.

=== Gallery ===
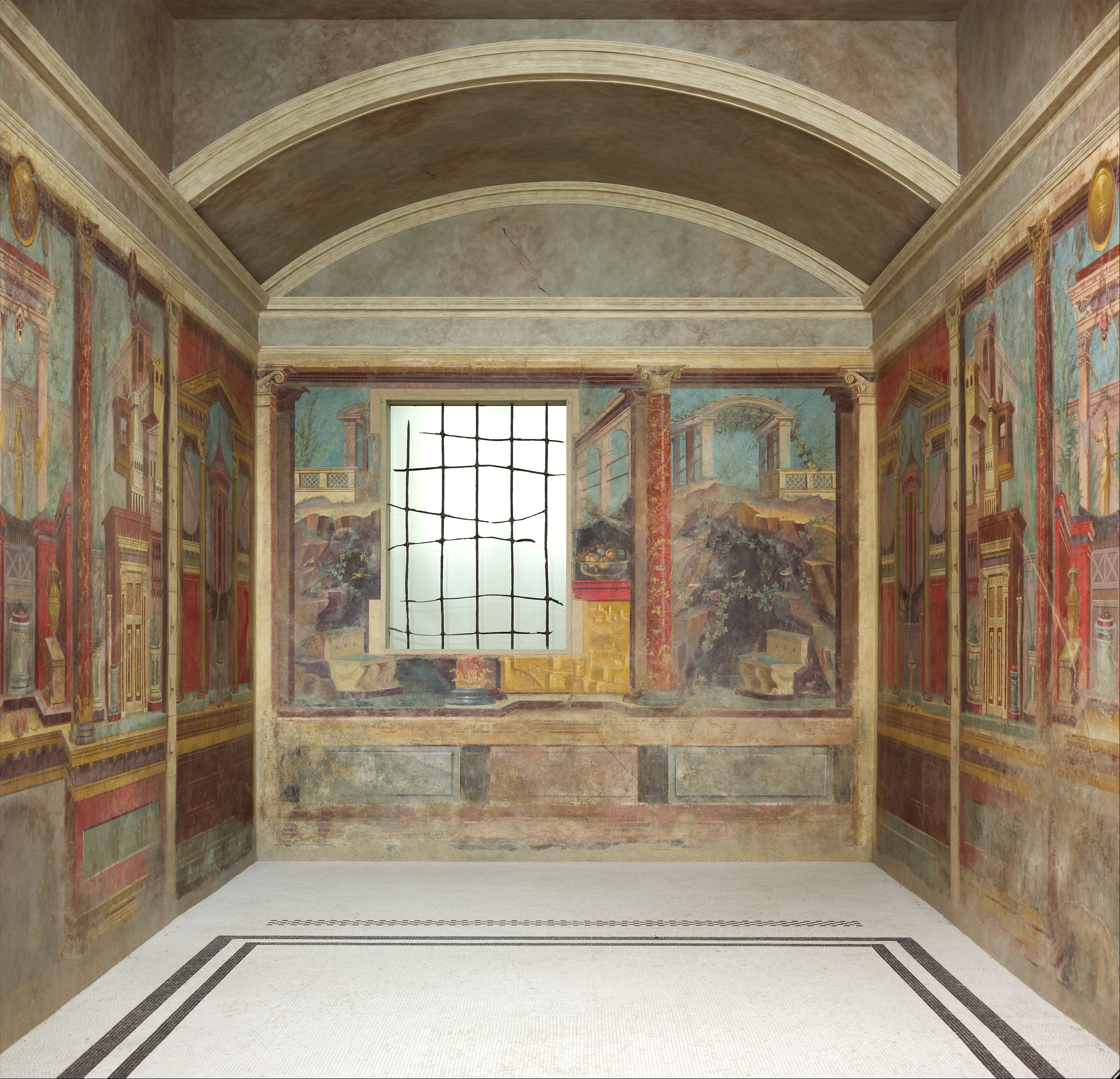
Cubiculum (bedroom) from the Villa of P. Fannius Synistor at Boscoreale now in the Metropolitan Museum of Art

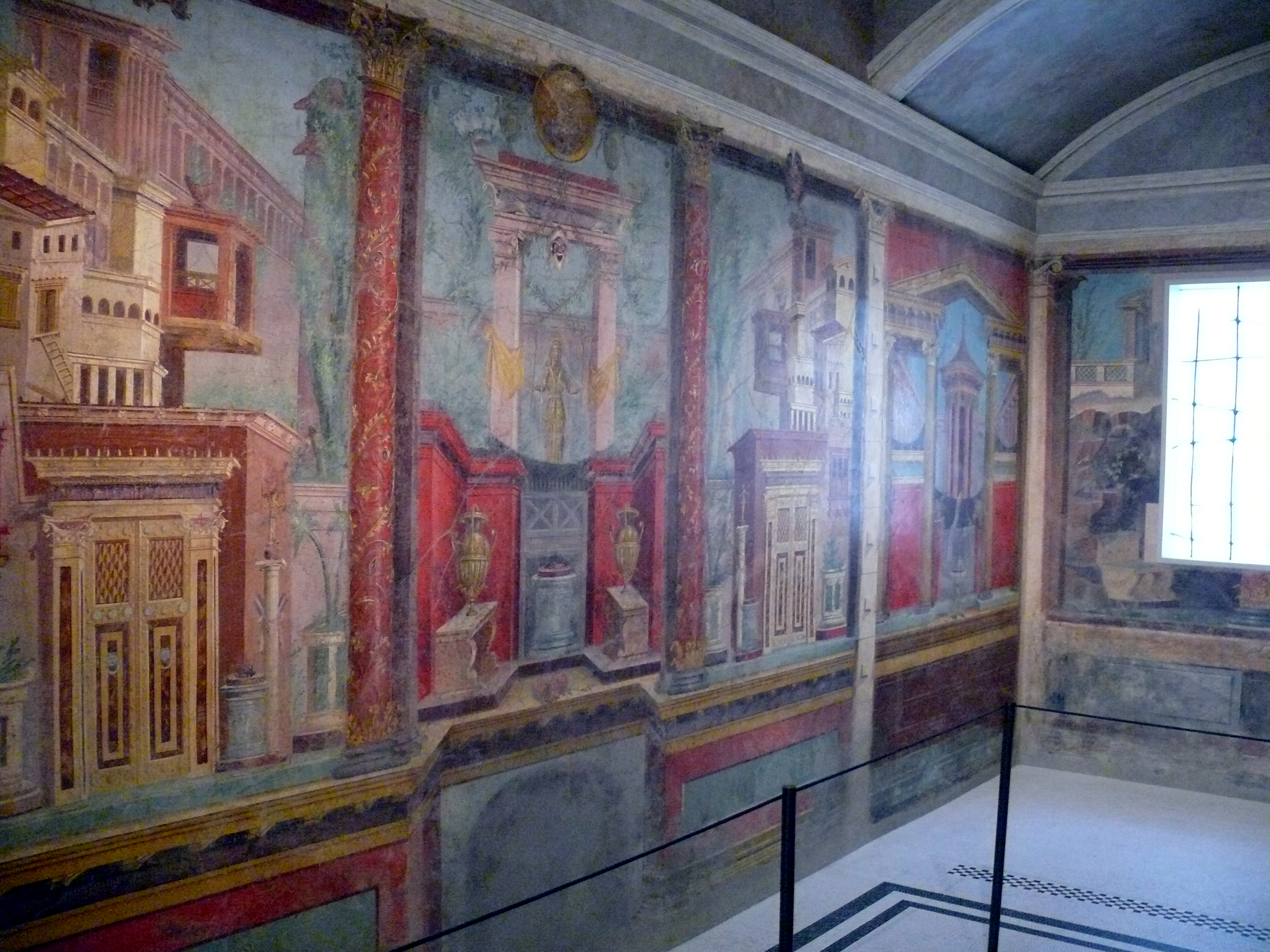
Cubiculum (bedroom) from the Villa of P. Fannius Synistor at Boscoreale. Fresco Roman Republican period Date: ca. 50–40 B.C.

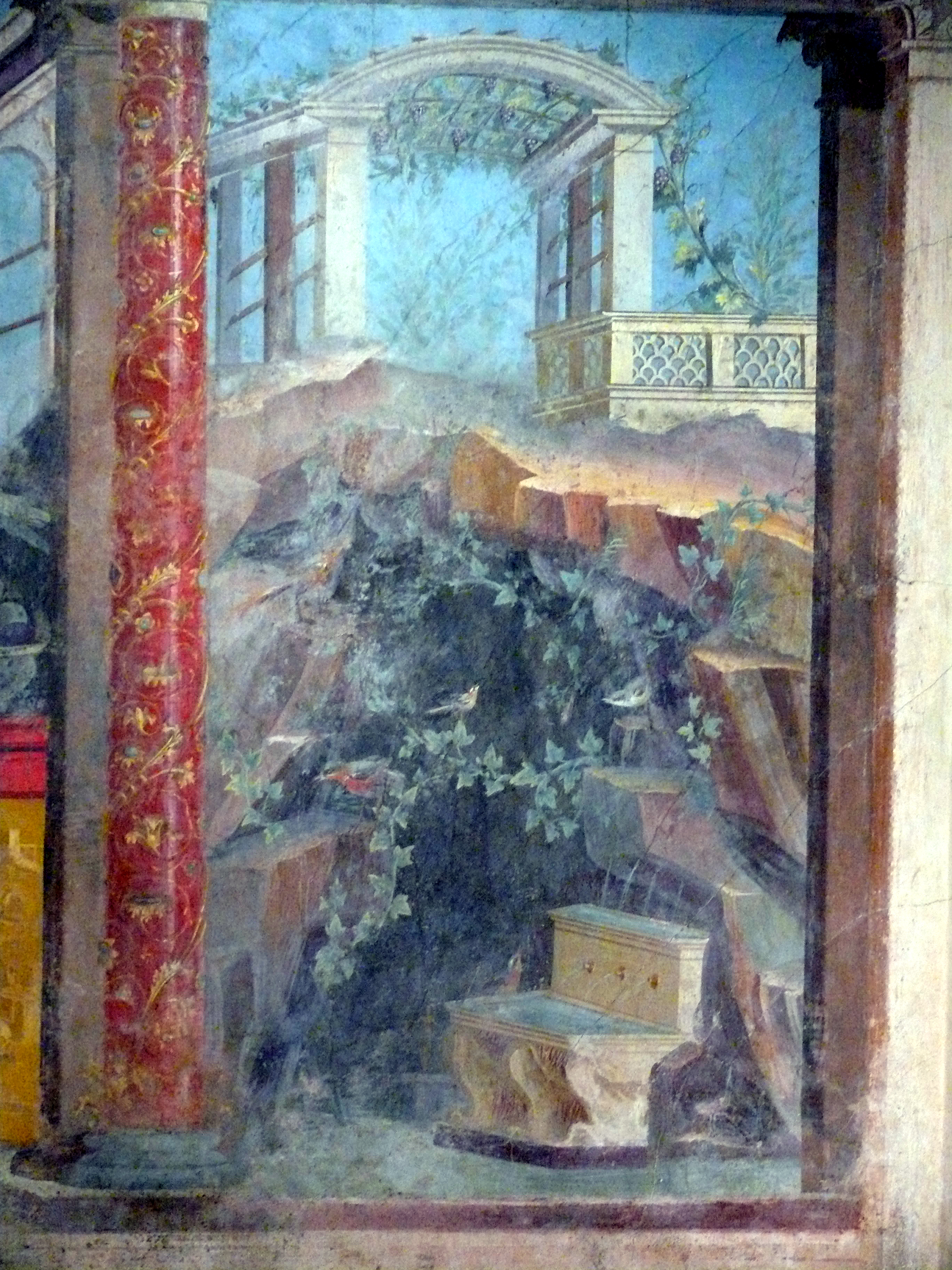
Architectural detail of 2D panel, Cubiculum (bedroom) from the Villa of P. Fannius Synistor at Boscoreale. Fresco Roman Republican period Date: ca. 50–40 B.C. (Metropolitan Museum)

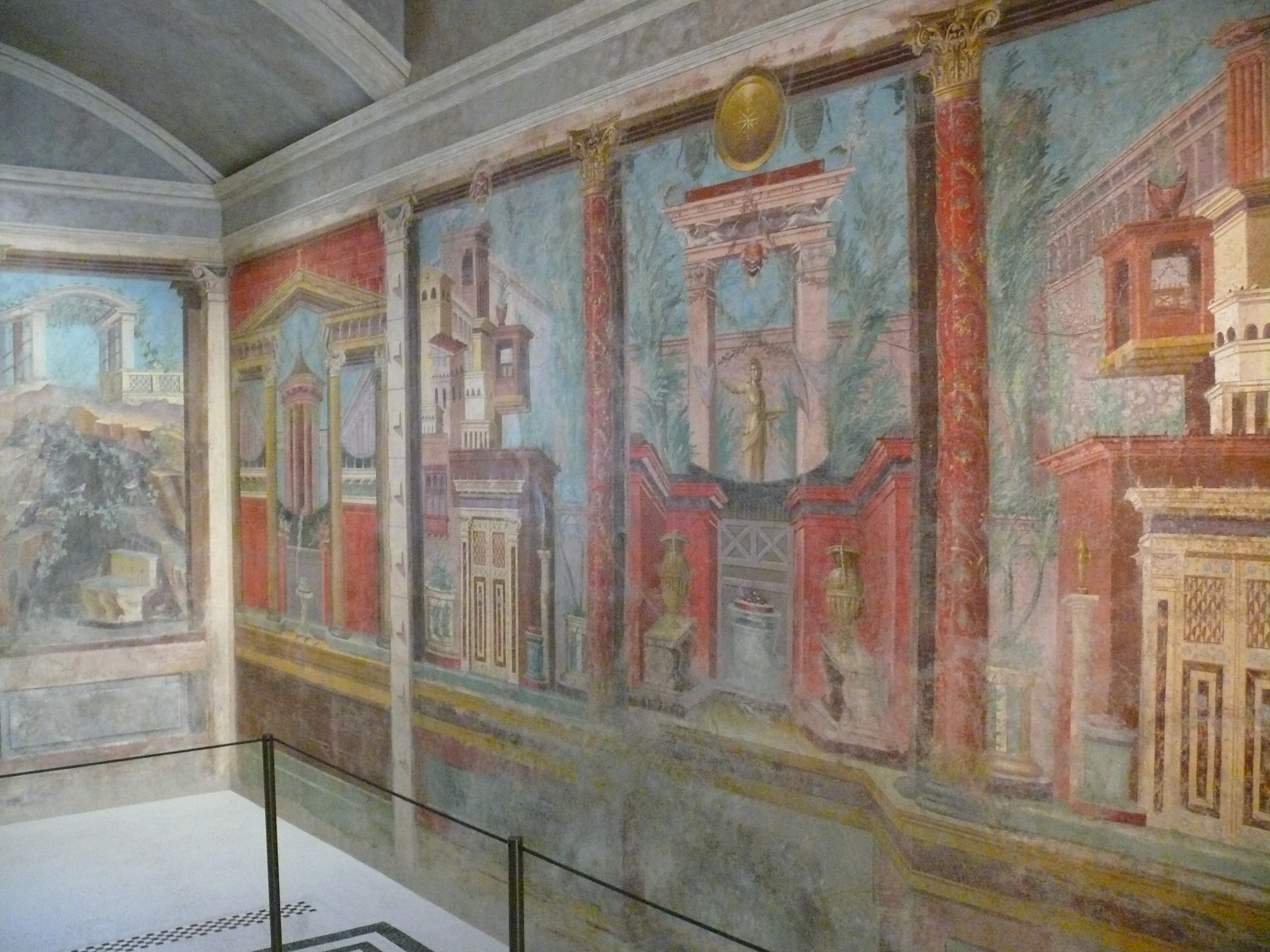
Cubiculum (bedroom) from the Villa of P. Fannius Synistor at Boscoreale. Fresco Roman Republican period Date: ca. 50–40 B.C.

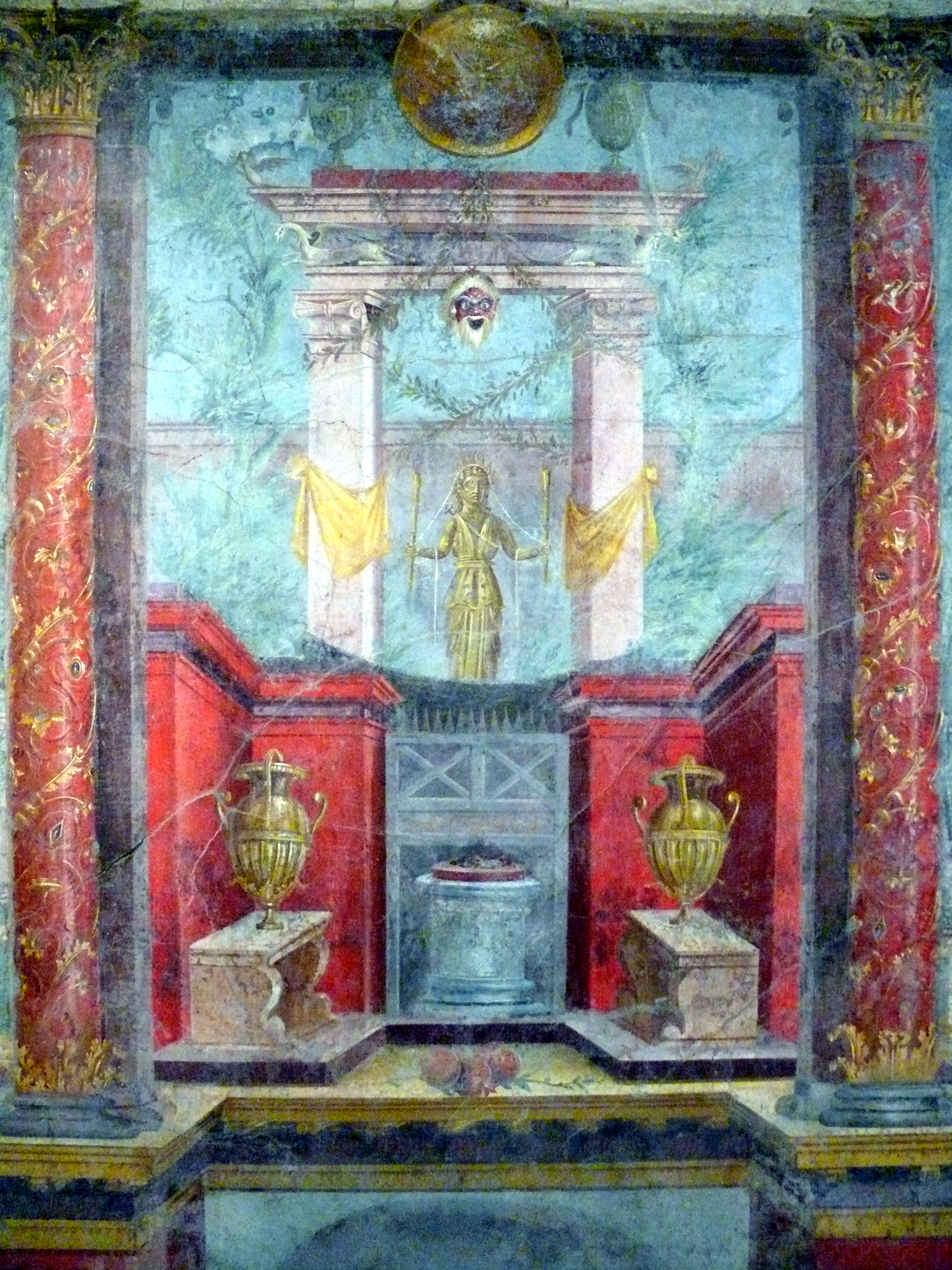
Architectural detail of 2D panel, Cubiculum (bedroom) from the Villa of P. Fannius Synistor at Boscoreale. Fresco Roman Republican period Date: ca. 50–40 B.C. (Metropolitan Museum)

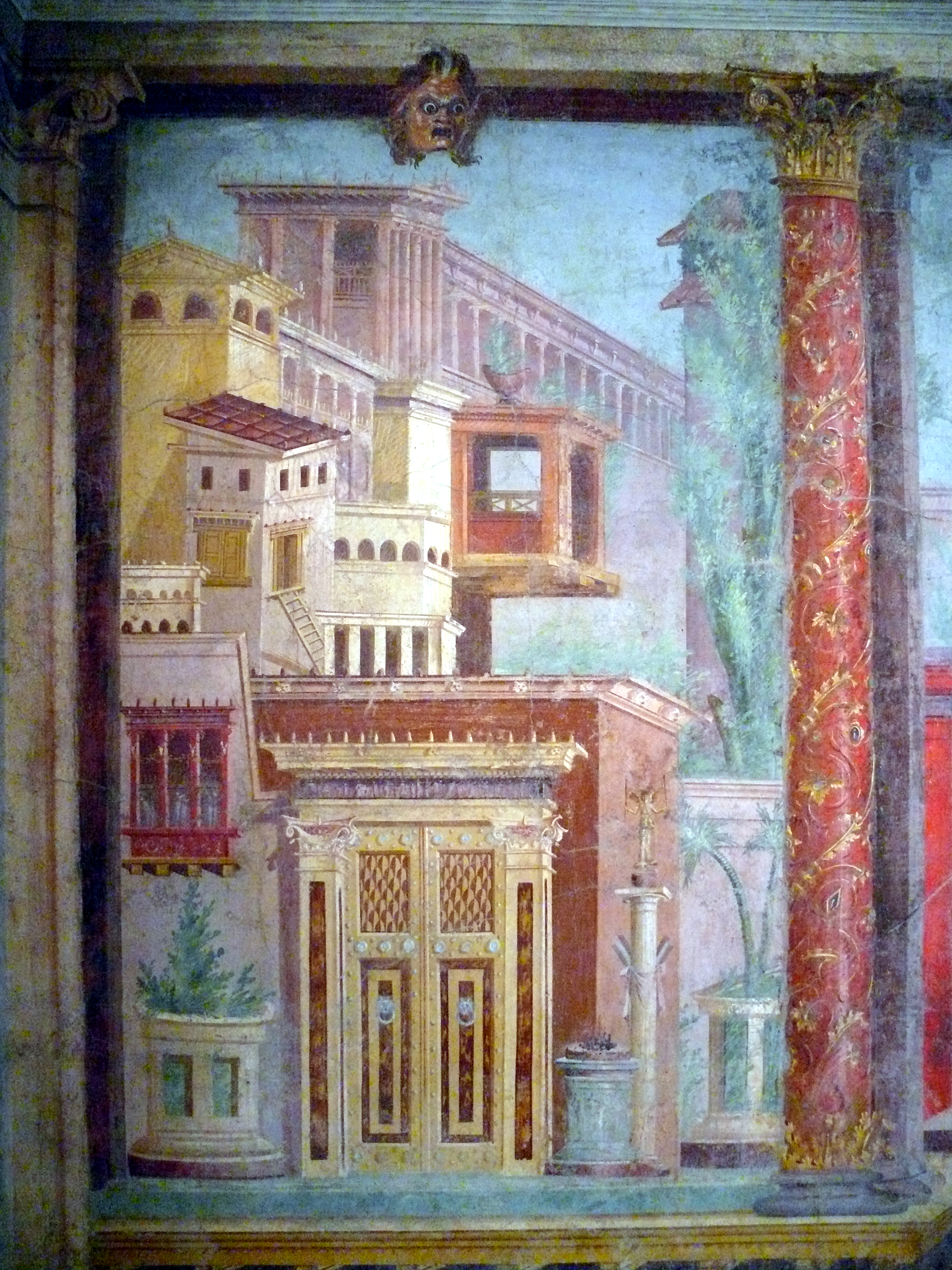
Architectural detail of 2D panel of original east wall, Cubiculum (bedroom) from the Villa of P. Fannius Synistor at Boscoreale. Fresco Roman Republican period Date: ca. 50–40 B.C. (Metropolitan Museum)

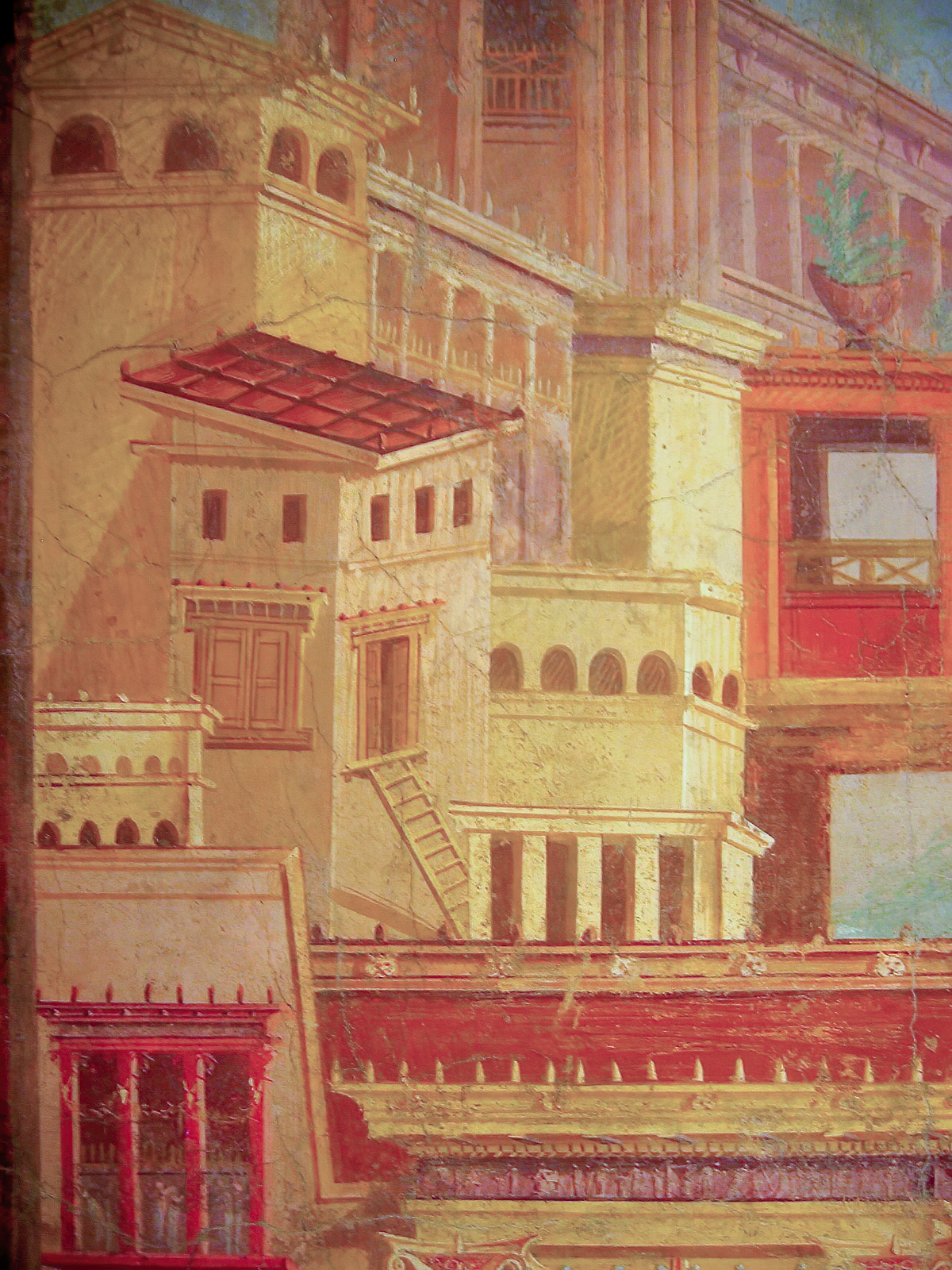
Closer detail showing treatment of orthogonal edges and color

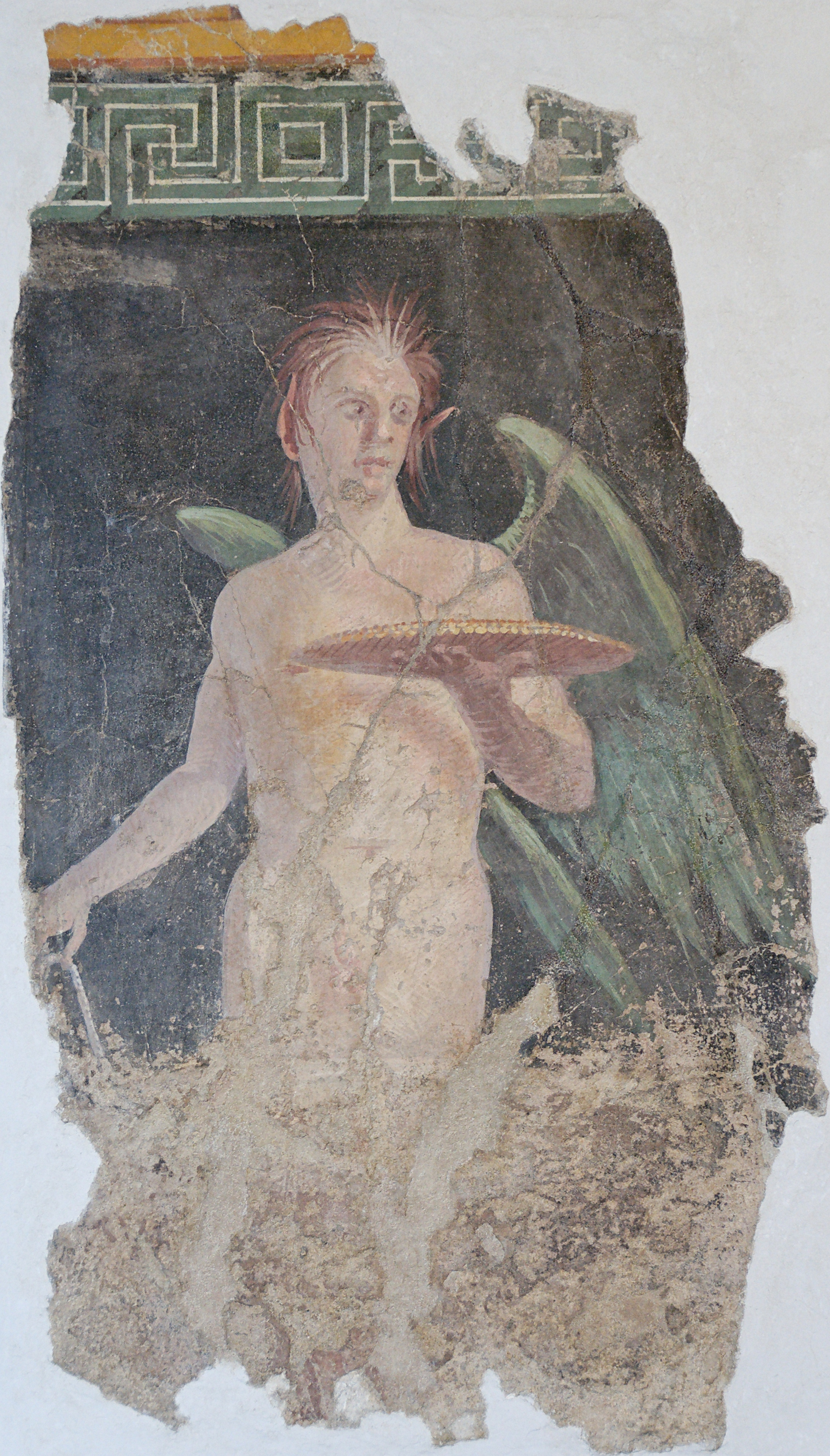
A winged genius, from the peristyle

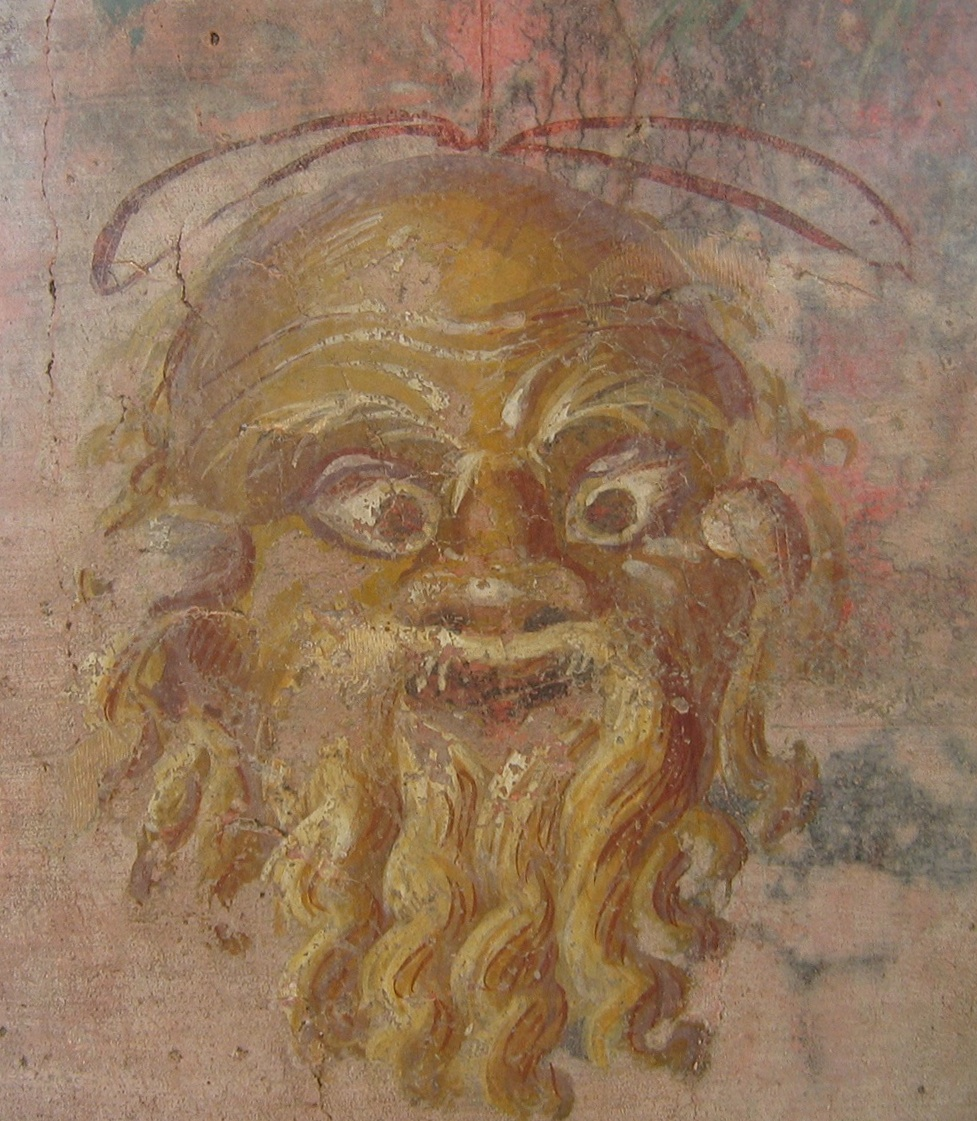
Silenus mask from garland in exedra

== Villa della Pisanella ==
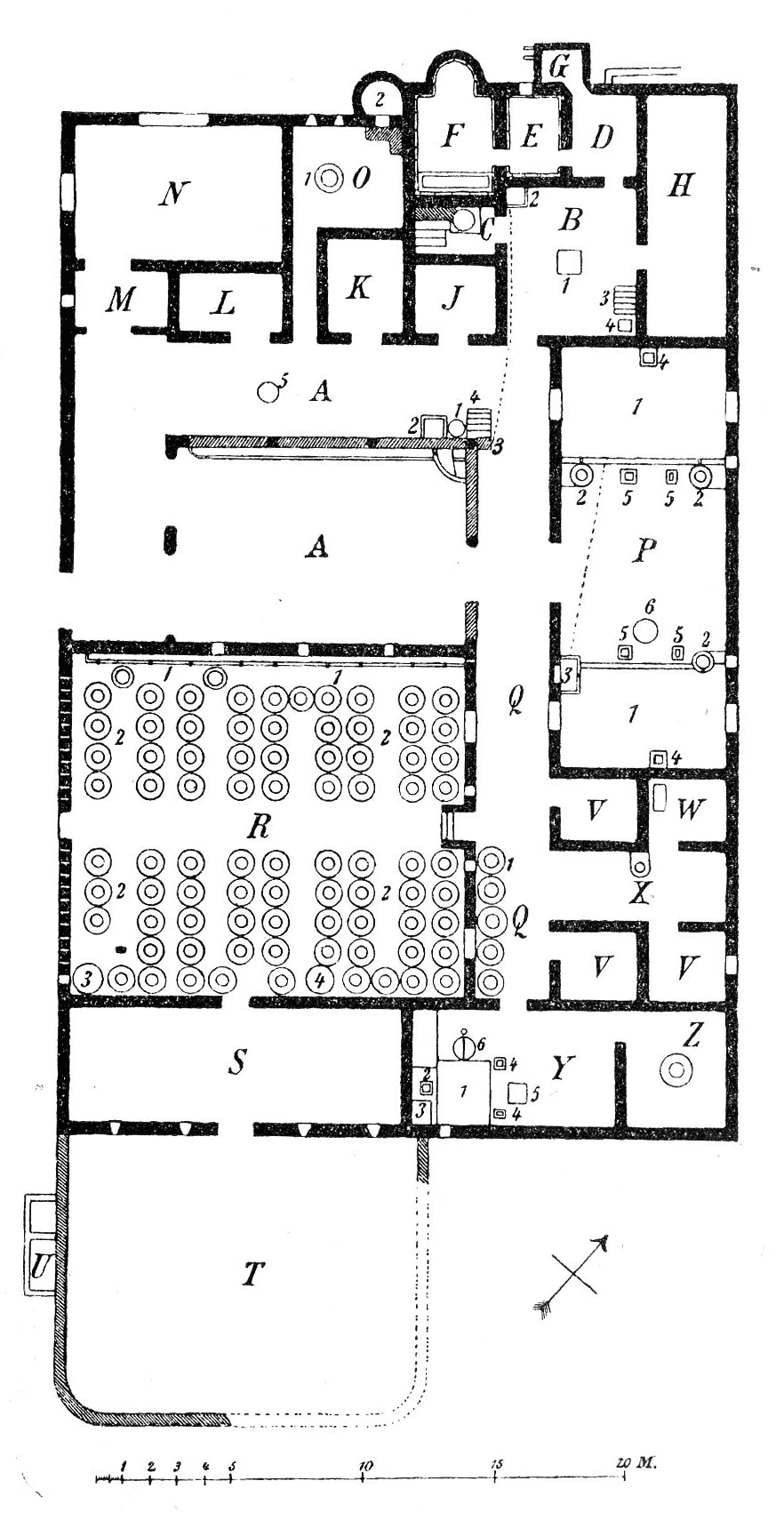
Plan of Villa della Pisanella: A - courtyard, atrium, B - kitchen, C-G - bath with tepidarium, caldarium, etc., H - stables (?), E - larder, K and L - living rooms, N - dining room, M - anteroom, O - bakery, P - wine press, Q - corridor, R - wine storehouse, T - threshing floor, U - pluvial, VVV - living rooms, X - hand mill, Z - oil mills

The villa was first unearthed by the landowners over several seasons from 1876.

In 1894 excavations brought to light a villa rustica covering 1000 m^{2} with clearly defined residential sector with baths and a pars rustica with farm buildings and warehouses. The breeding of farmyard animals was practiced and most of the rooms on the ground floor were used for processing and conservation of oil, wine and cereals.

The majority of portable belongings seems to have still been in place, though some objects were unlikely to be in the locations of their intended use: while many chests and wardrobes held stored furnishings, some material may have been brought in for temporary storage, such as two bronze bathtubs decorated with lion heads handles that had no obvious destination in the bathing complex, one of which even being too large to fit through the last door. In a large chest were forty keys and silver tableware; in the kitchen the skeleton of a dog on a chain; in the stable the bones of several tethered horses, one of which had managed to wriggle out and escape. In the olive pressing-room (torcularium) the first three human skeletons came to light, including that of a woman, possibly the mistress of the house, who wore splendid gold earrings with topaz jewels, and as the subject of much romanticization has been called the last owner, Maxima, which is a name written on many of the silver vessels. Some have speculated that the previous owner of the villa was L. Caecilius Lucundus, a banker from Pompeii, who inherited the wealth of the Julio-Claudian dynasty in Campania, who was the father of the hypothetical Maxima.

In 1895 in the torcularium the magnificent so-called Boscoreale Treasure was found in a chest and consisted of 102 items: silver tableware, bracelets, earrings, rings, a double gold chain. A thousand gold coins were still in the remains of a leather bag. At the time of the eruption it was probably one of the safest rooms in the villa where the owner gave the order to a trusted man to hide it for better times. All the treasures were smuggled out to France via the Rothschild Family and sold.

The excavations of the villa were resumed in 1896 by Angiolo Pasqui.
