= Boscoreale Treasure =

Ancient Roman objects found near Pompeii

Coordinates: 48.8603°N 2.3375°E

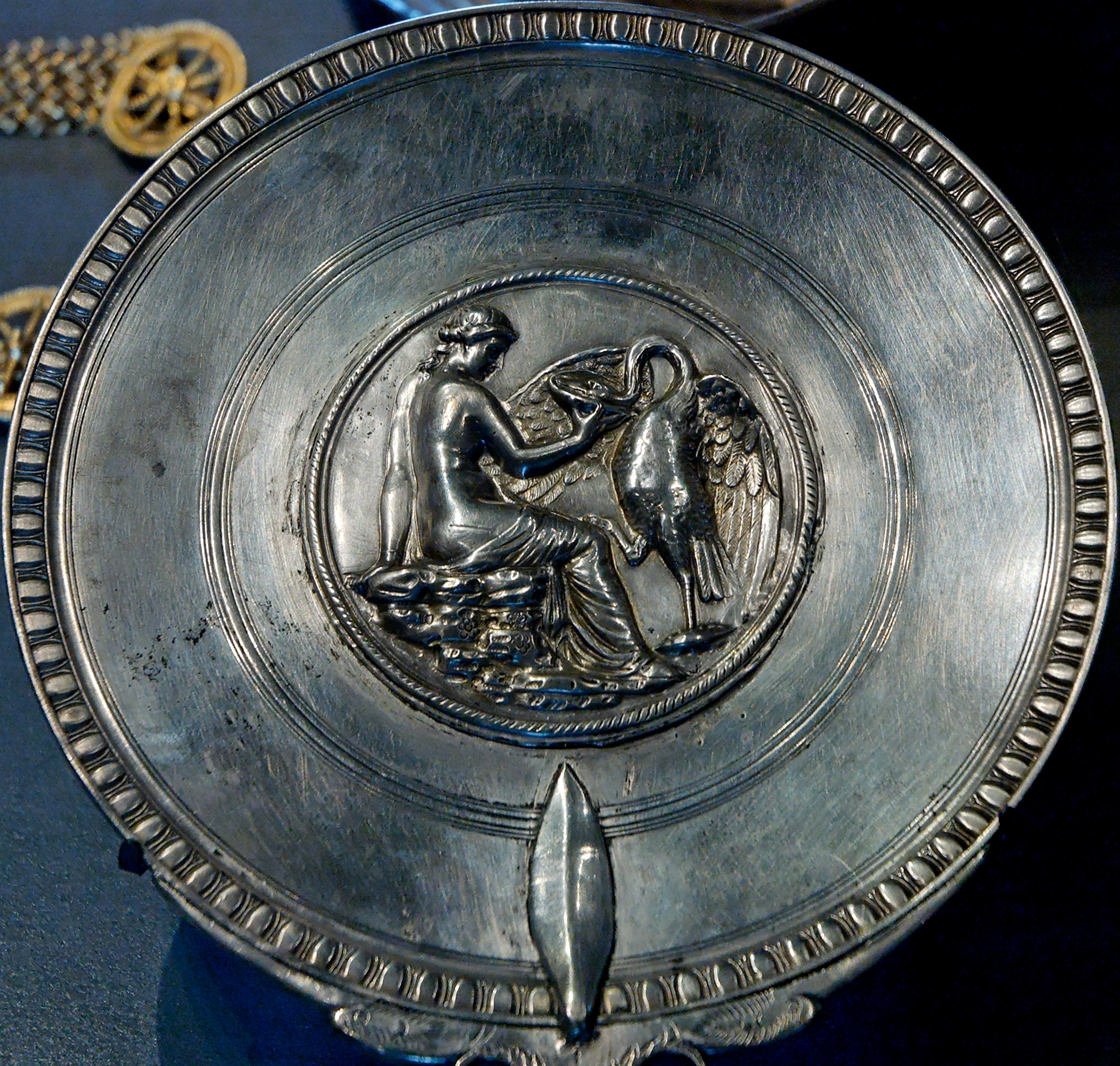
- Mirror from the Boscoreale Treasure as displayed in the Louvre
- Material: Silver
- Created: 1st Century AD (mostly)
- Present location: Louvre, Paris and British Museum, London

The Boscoreale Treasure is a large collection of exquisite silver and gold Roman objects discovered in the ruins of the ancient Villa della Pisanella at Boscoreale, near Pompeii, southern Italy. Consisting of over a hundred pieces of silverware, as well as gold coins and jewellery, it is now mostly kept at the Louvre Museum in Paris, although parts of the treasure can also be found at the British Museum.

== History ==
Located northwest of Pompeii, Boscoreale was the location of a large Roman villa, the Villa della Pisanella, that was buried by volcanic ash following the eruption of Mount Vesuvius in 79 AD. The villa was unearthed during several archaeological seasons, confirming the hypothesis of a villa rustica covering 1000 m^{2} with clearly defined residential sector and farm buildings. The villa was discovered in 1876, but it was only on April 13, 1895 that the remains of a vaulted box containing the treasure was discovered in the wine-pressing room of the villa. The box contained silver tableware consisting of 109 items and a leather bag full of coins to the value of a thousand gold aurei. Many items of precious metal were abandoned in Pompeii and its surrounding area by their owners as they attempted to flee the destruction.

Most of the Boscoreale Treasure was legally sold in 1895 to several European dealers and collectors as Italy's first major law regulating the export of cultural goods was Law No. 185 of 1902. Even then, the state had first right of refusal; being offered the coins and artifacts, the Director of the National Archaeological Museum, Naples deemed the price asked too high and declined the offer. Part of it was later purchased by Baron Edmond de Rothschild who donated it to the Louvre Museum in 1896. Baron de Rothschild (19 August 1845 – 2 November 1934) was a French member of the Rothschild banking family. Given the number of the items, their weight over 30 kg, their technical quality and aesthetic value, the silver set from Boscoreale is among the most important and most prestigious sets of this period.

It is assumed that the objects were intentionally hidden in the storehouse before the eruption of Mount Vesuvius in AD 79. The last owner of the silver set was probably a woman named Maxima – a name written on many of the vessels. A woman was found nearby but there is no definitive answer to the question of whether she is Maxima. It is assumed that the owner of the villa and the entire property is L. Caecilius lucundus, a banker from Pompeii, who inherited the wealth of the Julio-Claudian dynasty in Campania, and that he was the father of Maxima.

== Description ==
The treasure consists of 109 pieces of silverware, as well as gold jewellery (necklaces, bracelets and earrings) and over 1000 gold coins. Items from the hoard vary in date from the 4th century BC to the 1st century AD. Many of the silver items from the treasure are considered masterpieces of Roman art that could only have belonged to the very elite sections of society. A few objects also seem to be family heirlooms passed down the generations. Parts of the hoard are inscribed with the name Maxima who were perhaps the original owner. Some of the most well-known items in the treasure include:

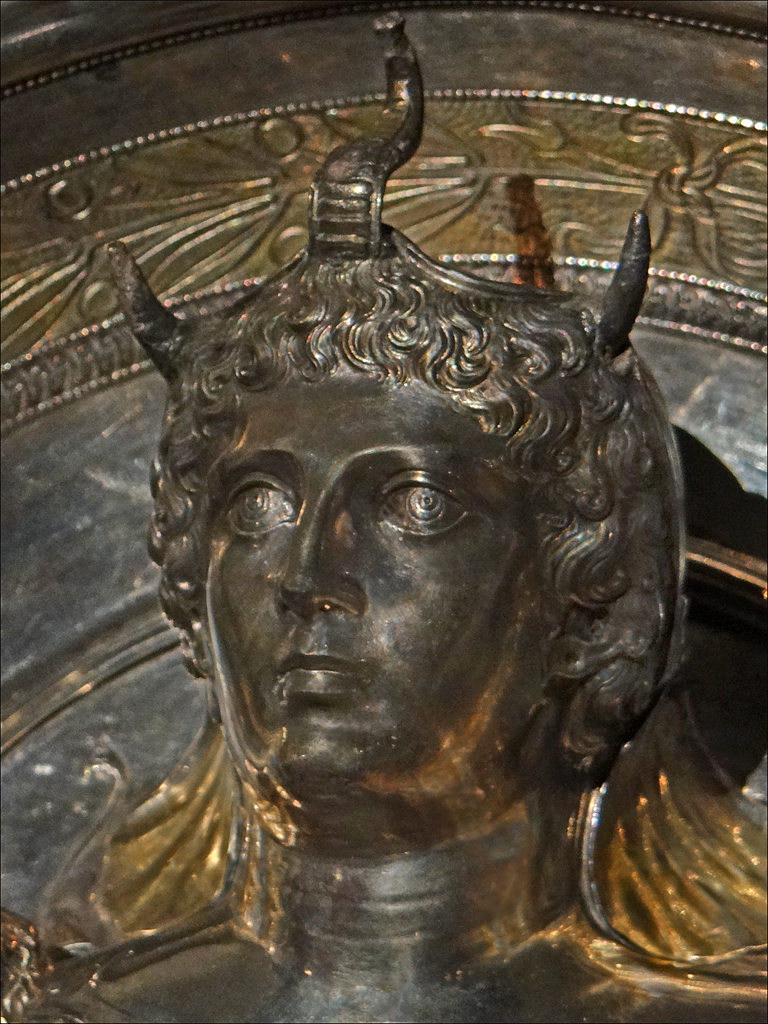
A likely depiction of Cleopatra Selene II, Queen of Mauretania (daughter of Cleopatra VII of Egypt), wearing an elephant scalp, raised relief image on a gilded silver dish, from the Boscoreale Treasure, early 1st century AD

- Skyphos cup of Augustus on a military campaign, seated and surrounded by his lictors and lieutenants as he grants clemency to suppliant barbarians. The alternate side of the Skyphos depicts Augustus among Gods such as Venus, Cupid and Mars, who represent four conquered provinces.
- Skyphos cup of Tiberius on a triumphal procession through the streets of Rome. The emperor-to-be rides in a horse-drawn chariot holding a laurel branch and an eagle-tipped sceptre. The alternate side of the Skyphos depicts Tiberius sacrificing a bull in front of a temple to Jupiter.
- Two silver cups decorated with skeletons. The two silver cups have similar and complementary repoussé decoration depicting the skeletons of tragic and comic poets and famous Greek philosophers, beneath a garland of roses.
- Pair of kantharoi with squatting boar in relief.
- Pair of dishes with relief medallions of the busts of a man and women (although only the bust of the latter survives)
- Plate with the central medallion showing the personification of Africa. In the center is a bust of a young woman wearing an elephant hide cap, holding an asp/cobra in her right hand and a cornucopia of plenty full of fruit in her left. The symbolism of the objects around the woman and her facial features strongly suggest that it is a posthumous portrait of Cleopatra Selene II, Queen of Mauretania, wife of Juba II, and daughter of Cleopatra VII of Egypt, and most likely commissioned by Ptolemy of Mauretania, son of Cleopatra Selene II (shortly after her death in 6/5 BC).
- A polished toiletry mirror with a brilliant reflection, practically this was used to view oneself, the decoration represents the meeting of Leda and Jupiter, turned into a swan, and is a hymn to femininity and sensuality.
- Oenochoe of a goddess sacrificing a bull
- Stemless silver cup with gilded central boss and bands of lotus leaves dating from 300 BC

== Roman Aurei ==
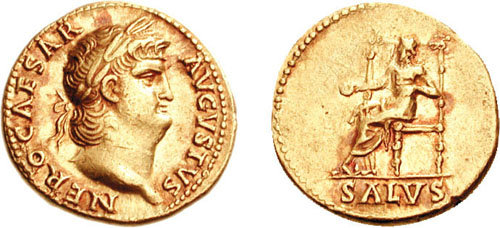
Aureus of Nero (54-68 AD), Rome mint, struck circa 65-66 AD

No formal study of the coins was made before they were dispersed into the market and, as is often the case, it is very possible that a list published in 1909 includes material from other finds.

The most recent coin of the Boscoreale hoard dates to AD 79, the date of the eruption. The intense heat from Mount Vesuvius imbued all the gold coins (aurei) with the red toning that we now see.

== Gallery ==
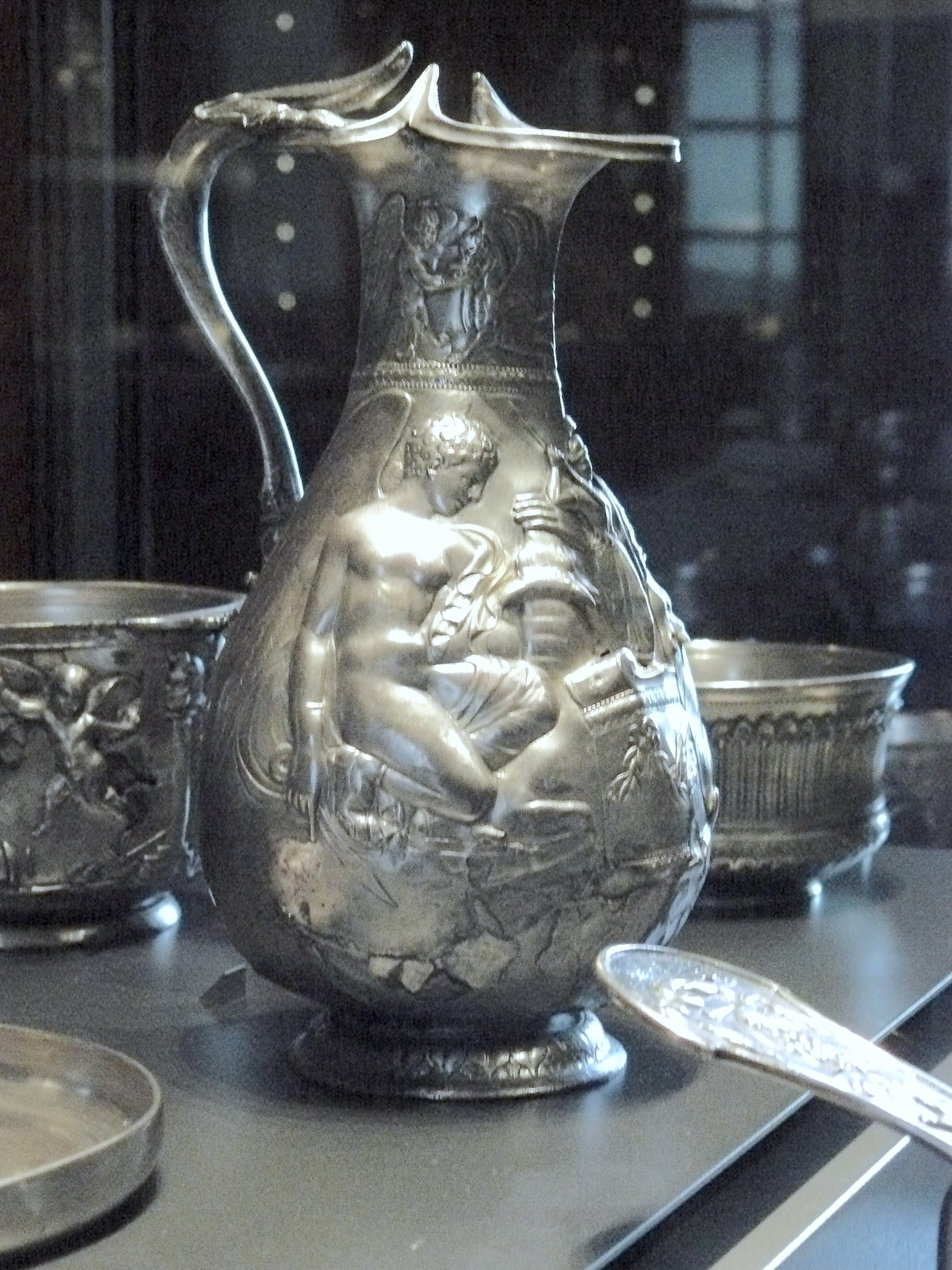
Silver Oenochoe (Louvre)

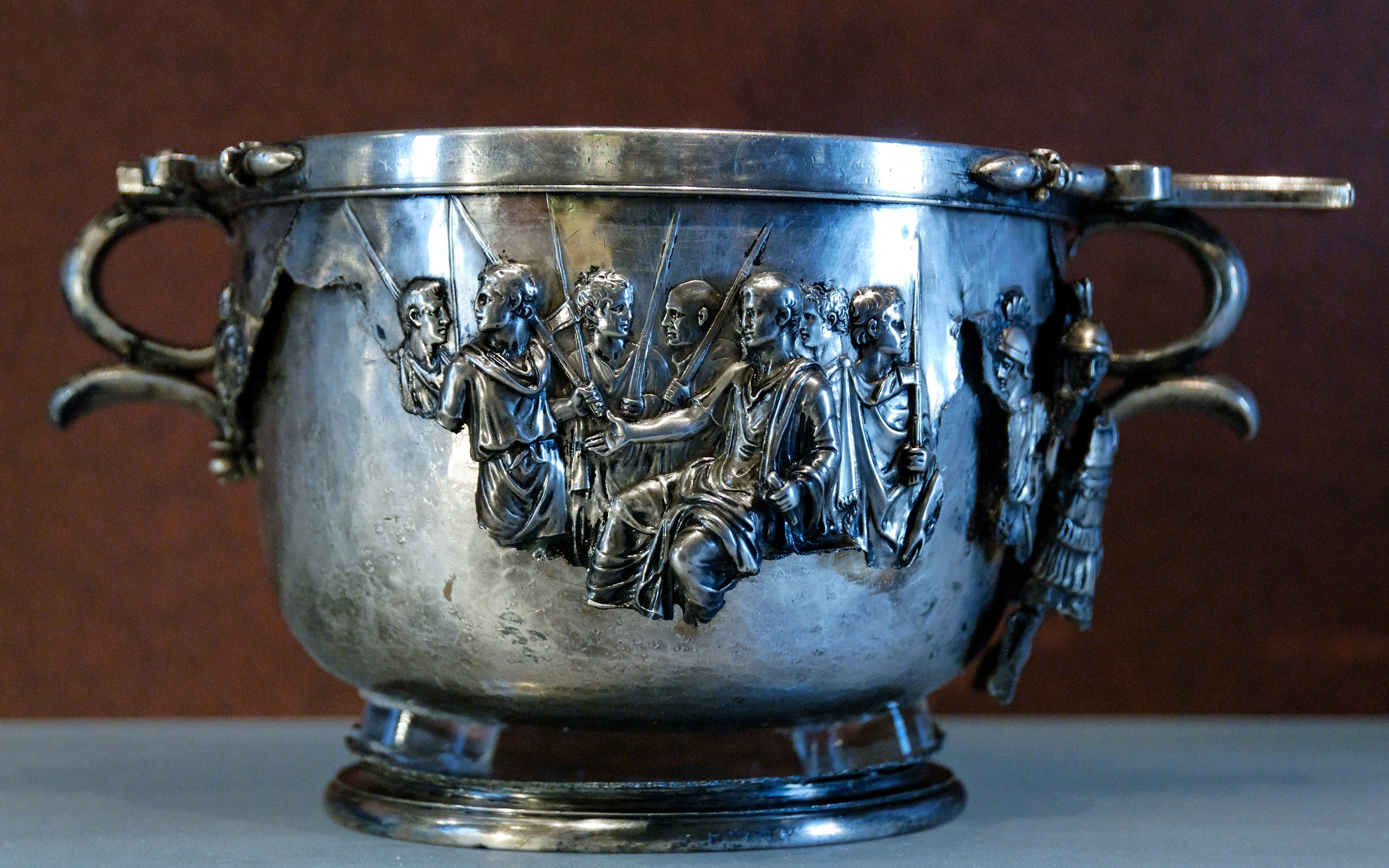
Skyphos with seated Augustus receiving vanquished barbarians

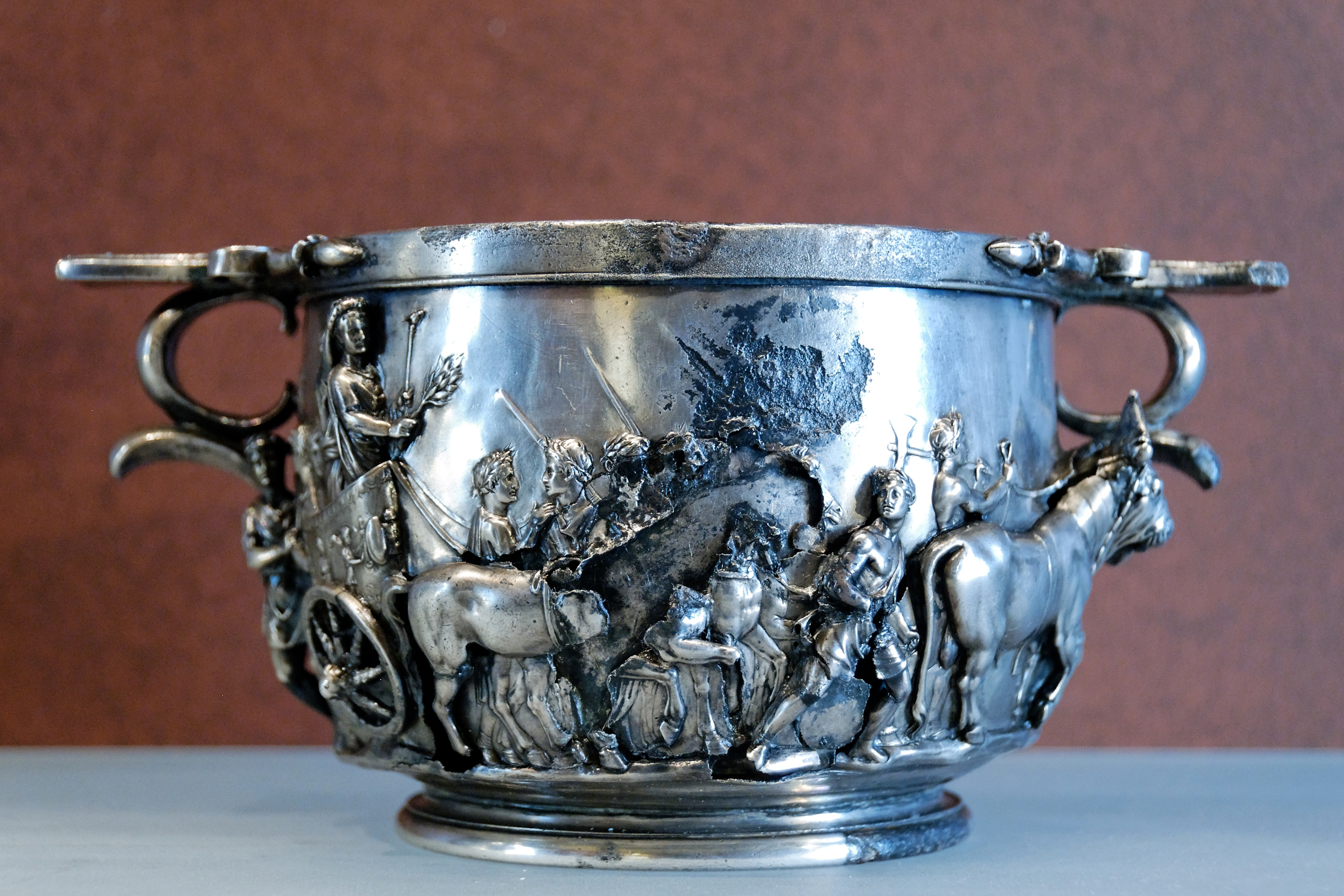
Skyphos with the Emperor Tiberius's triumph

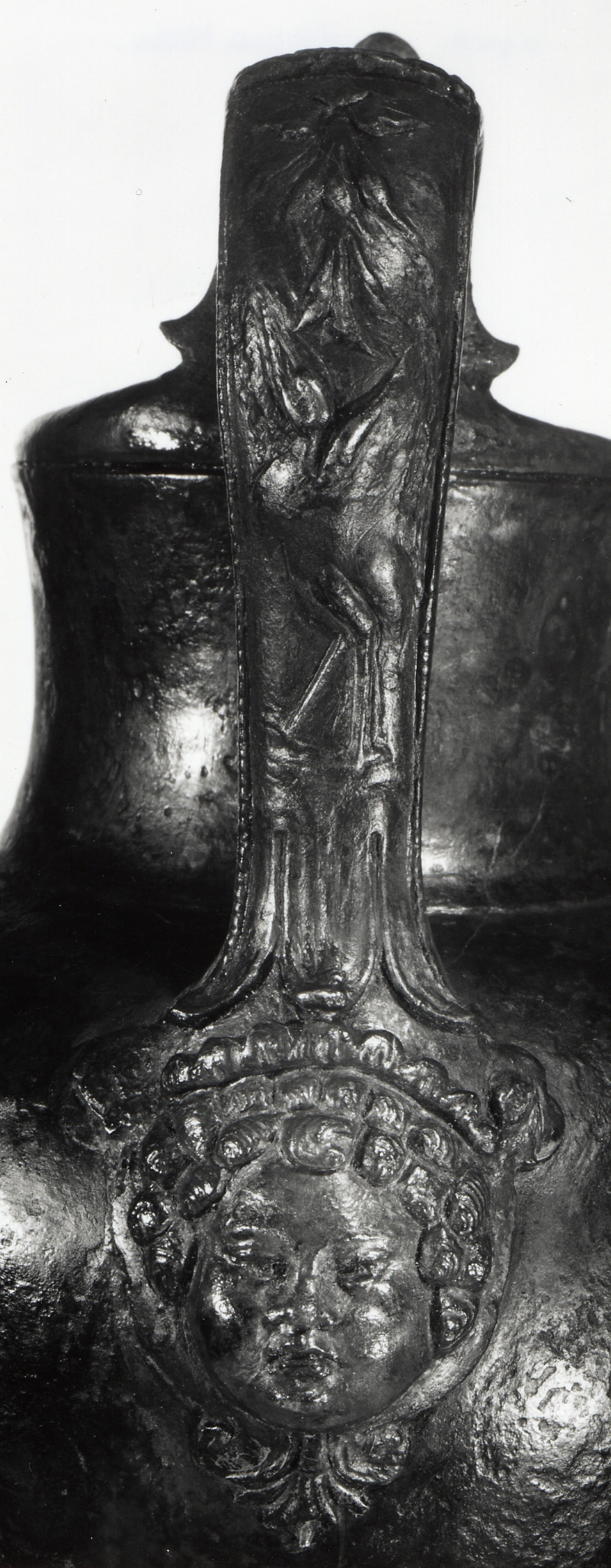
Handle with image of a child's face from an oenochoe

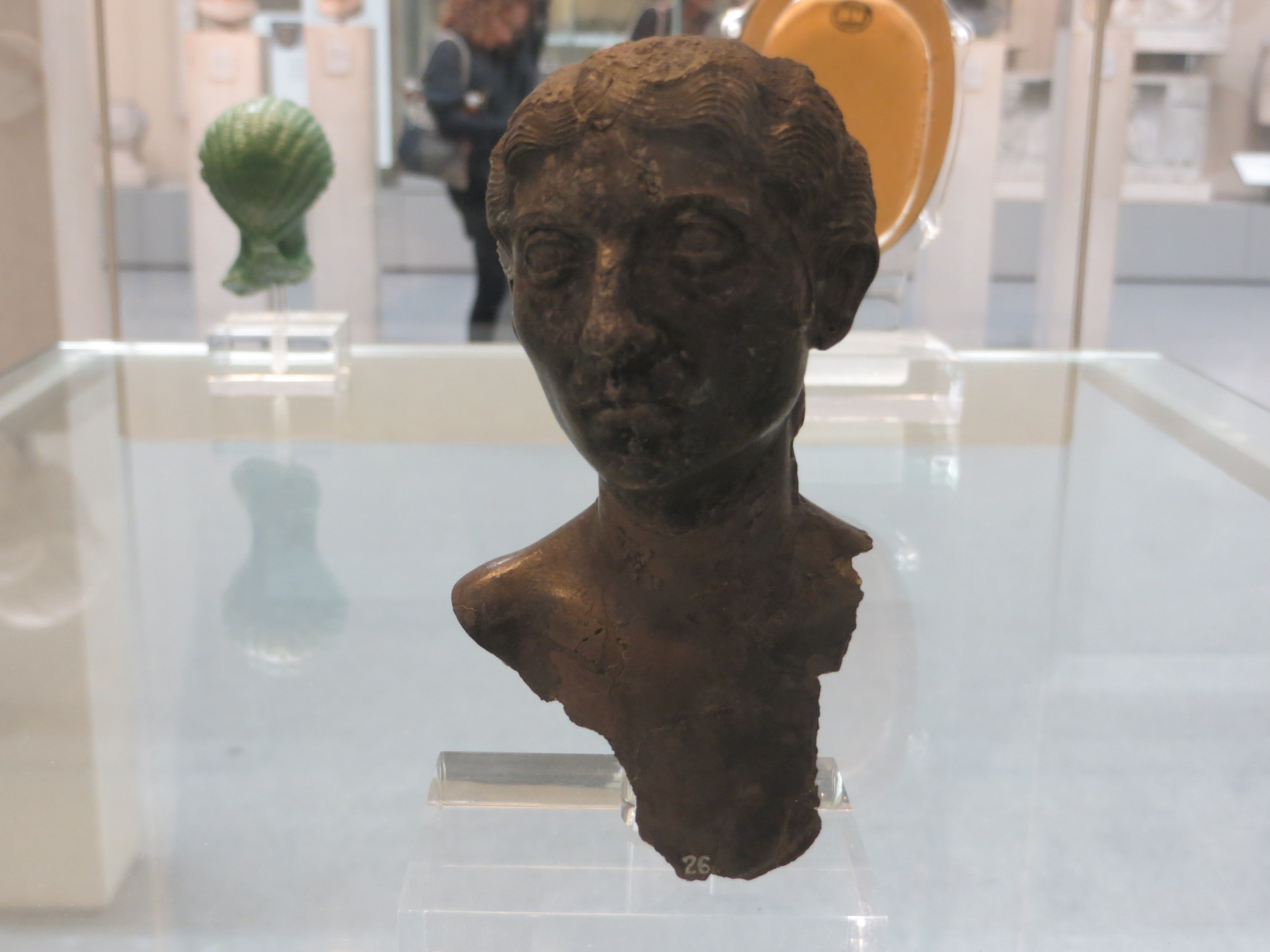
Female bust from the silver plate (British Museum)

== See also ==
- Berthouville Treasure
- Hildesheim Treasure

== Bibliography ==
- Strong, Donald Emrys/ British Museum. Greek and Roman Gold and Silver Plate. London: Methuen & Co, 1966
- Walker, Susan. Roman Art. Introductory Guides. London: British Museum Press, 1991. ISBN 978-0-7141-2076-8
- baron Héron de Villefosse, Antoine-Marie. L'argenterie et bijoux d'or du trésor de Boscoreale : description des pièces conservées au Musée du Louvre. Paris: Leroux éditeur, 1903
- Baratte, François / Musée du Louvre. Le trésor d’orfèvrerie romaine de Boscoreale. Paris: Réunion des musées nationaux, 1986, p. 35, 65-67 & 91, ISBN 978-2-7118-2048-1
- Richter, Gisela M.A. The Portraits of the Greeks. London: The Phaidon Press, 1965, vol I (of 3), p. 67, 132 & 138
- baron Héron de Villefosse, Antoine-Marie & baron de Rothschild, Edmond James. Le trésor de Boscoreale, Monuments et Mémoires, Tome 5, fasc. 1-2. Fondation Eugène Piot. Paris: Ernest Leroux éd., 1899, p. 58-68, n° 7-8
