= Regio XI Circus Maximus =

Historical region of Rome

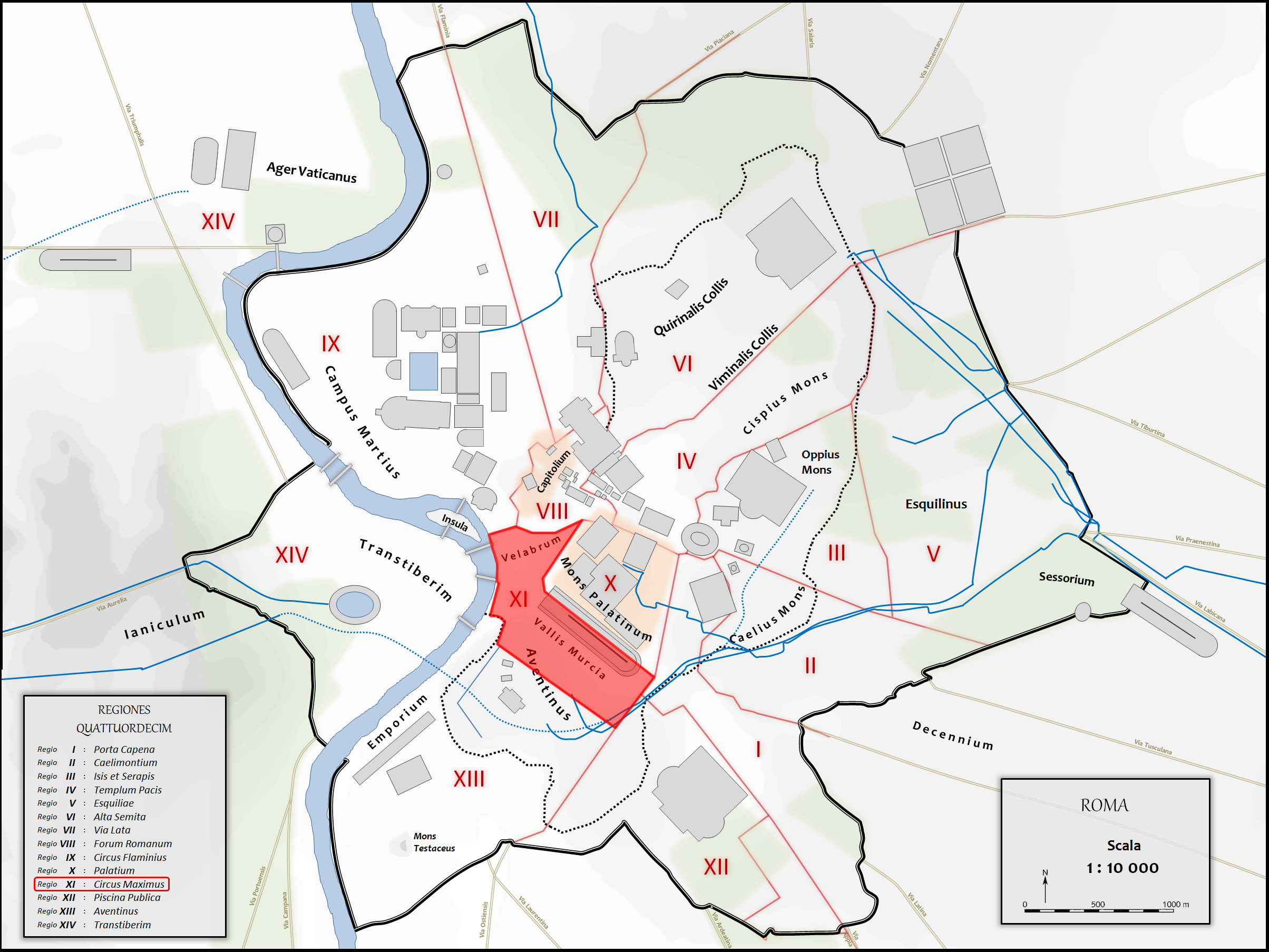

The Regio XI Circus Maximus is the eleventh regio of imperial Rome, under Augustus's administrative reform. Regio XI took its name from the Circus Maximus, located in the valley between the Palatine and the Aventine hills.

== Geographic extent and important features ==
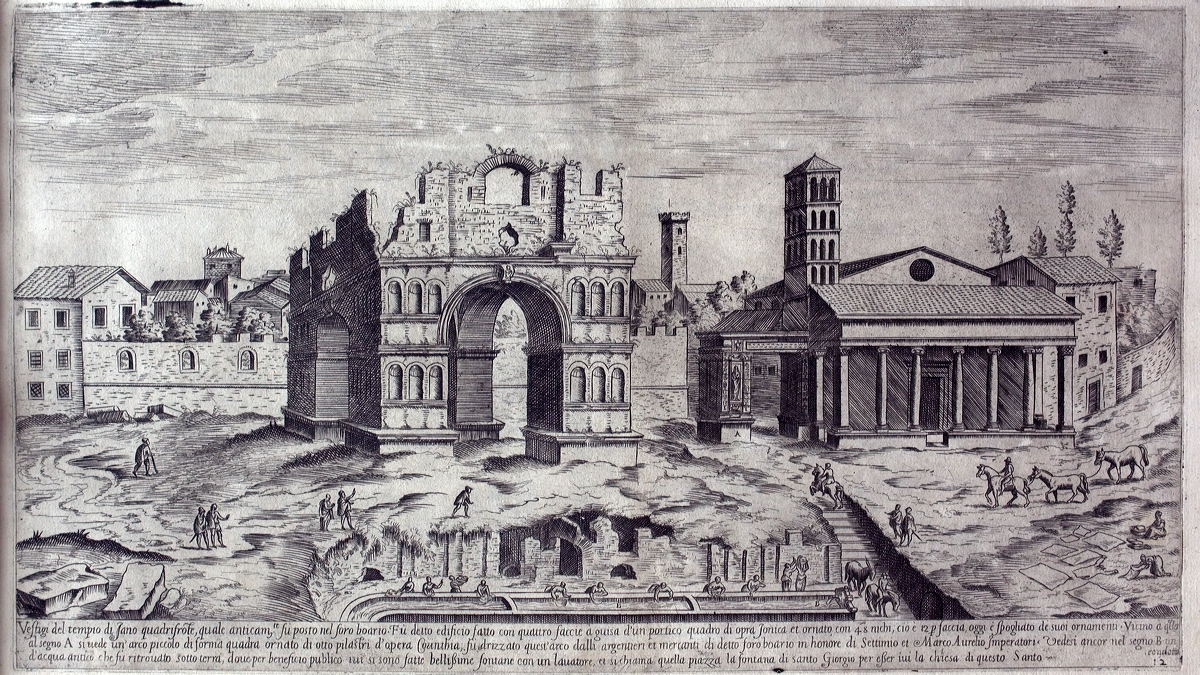
Drawing of the ruins of the Arch of Janus (1575)

Regio XI was dominated by the feature from which it derived its name, the Circus Maximus, Rome's largest venue for ludi (or public games) connected to Roman religious festivals. In extent, it was bordered by the Capitoline Hill to the north, the Palatine Hill to the east, the Aventine Hill to the south, and the Tiber River to the west. It also contained the areas of the Velabrum, the Vallis Murcia and the Forum Boarium. A measurement taken at the end of the 4th century recorded that the perimeter of the region was 11,500 Roman feet (approximately 3.4 km), making it the smallest of the Augustan regions.

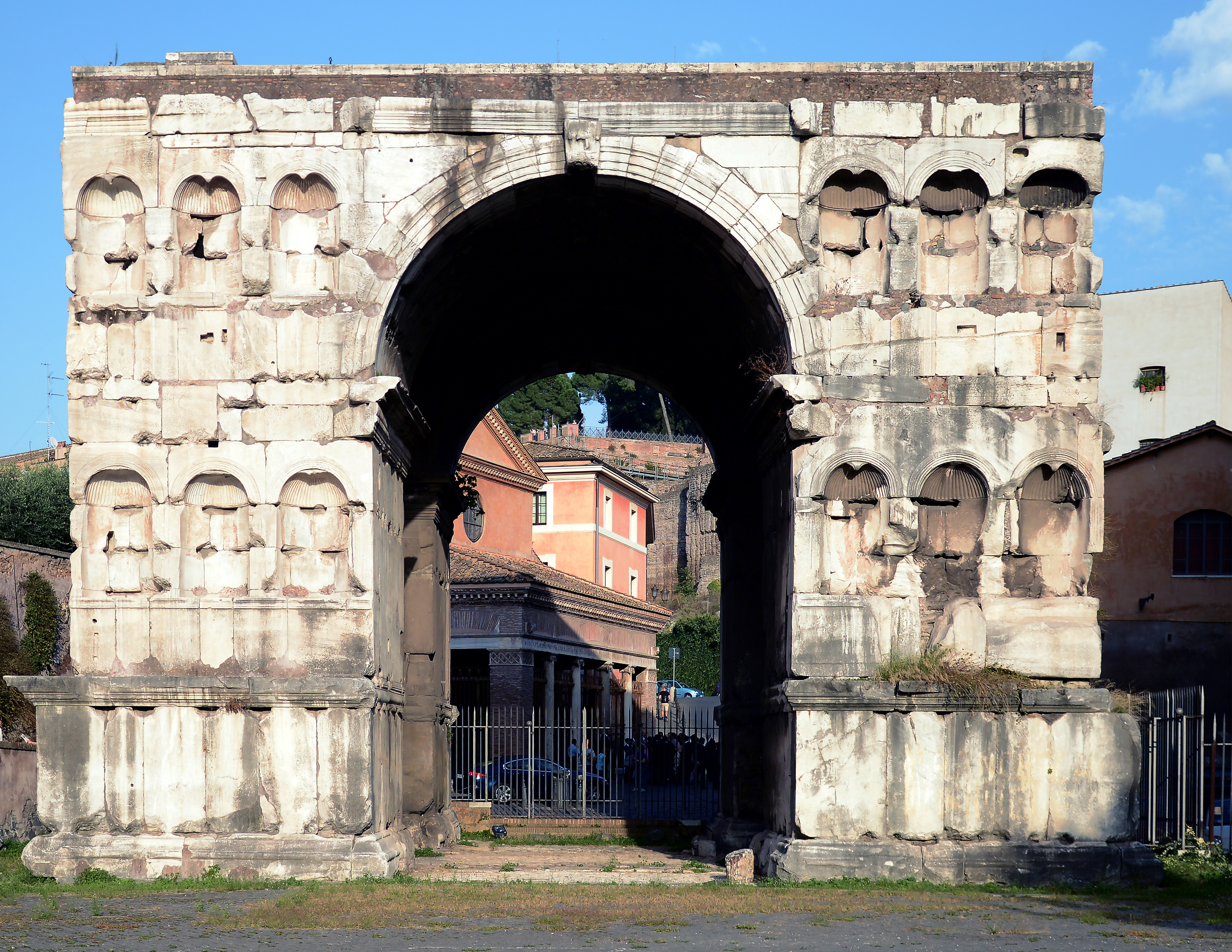
The remains of the Arch of Janus

Apart from the Circus itself, the largest in the city of Rome, according to the 5th century Notitia this region contained temples dedicated to the Sun, the Moon, Cerces, Dīs Pater (the Roman god of the Underworld), Magna Mater and Mercury. The main street in this region was the Clivus Publicus which led from the Circus to the Aventine where it encountered the Porta Trigemina.

Other features in Regio XI are the still intact Arch of Janus, and the Arcus Argentariorum, while no longer present is the Arch of Titus at the Circus Maximus. Within the Forum Boarium stood the Great Altar of Hercules, the Temple of Portunus, and the Temple of Hercules Victor. At the turn of the 5th century, the Regio contained 19 aediculae (shrines), 89 domūs (patrician houses), 16 horrea (warehouses), 15 balneae (bath houses) and 20 loci (fountains).

== Subdivisions ==
At the turn of the 5th century, the Regio was divided into 19 vici (districts) and 2,600 insulae (blocks). It had two curators and was served by 48 Roman magistrates.
