= Fountain of the Tritons =

Fountain in Rome with multiple Tritons

- Fountain
- {{{other_names}}}
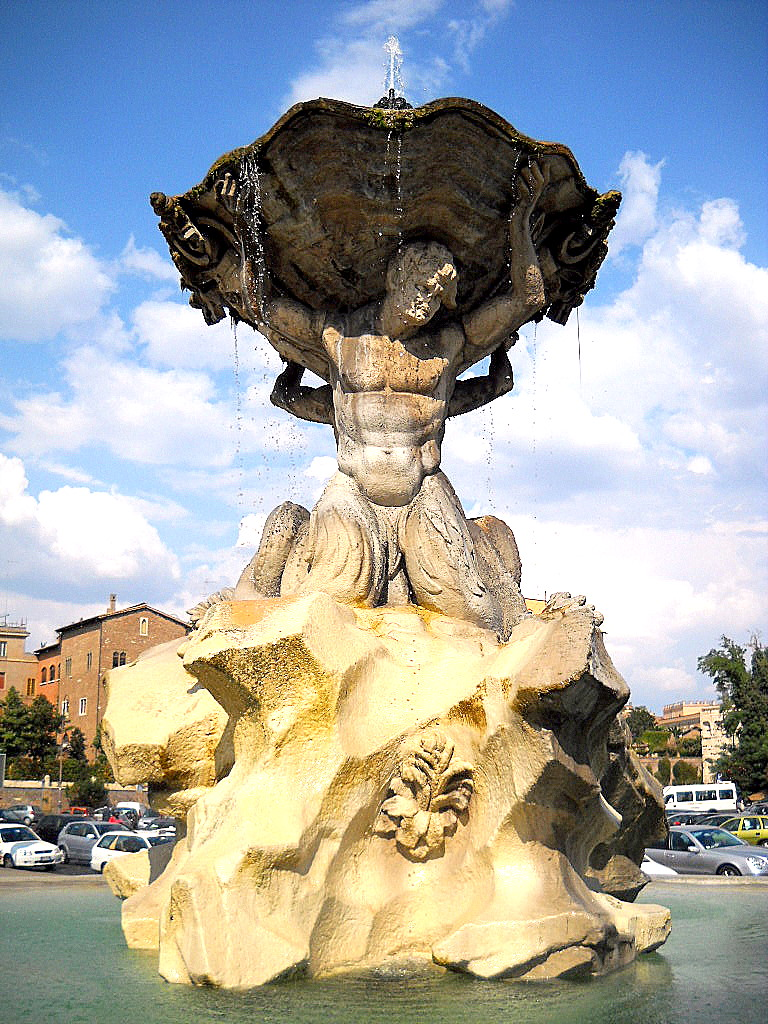
- The Fountain of the Tritons
- Design: Gian Lorenzo Bernini
- Location: Piazza Bocca della Verità, Rome
- Interactive map of Fountain of the Tritons
- Coordinates: 41°53′19″N 12°28′52″E

The Fountain of the Tritons (Italian: Fontana dei Tritoni) is a fountain in Rome (Italy), Piazza Bocca della Verità, in front of the basilica of Santa Maria in Cosmedin. This fountain should be distinguished from the similarly named nearby Triton Fountain (Fontana del Tritone) by Gian Lorenzo Bernini, in the Piazza Barberini, with only a single Triton.

== History ==
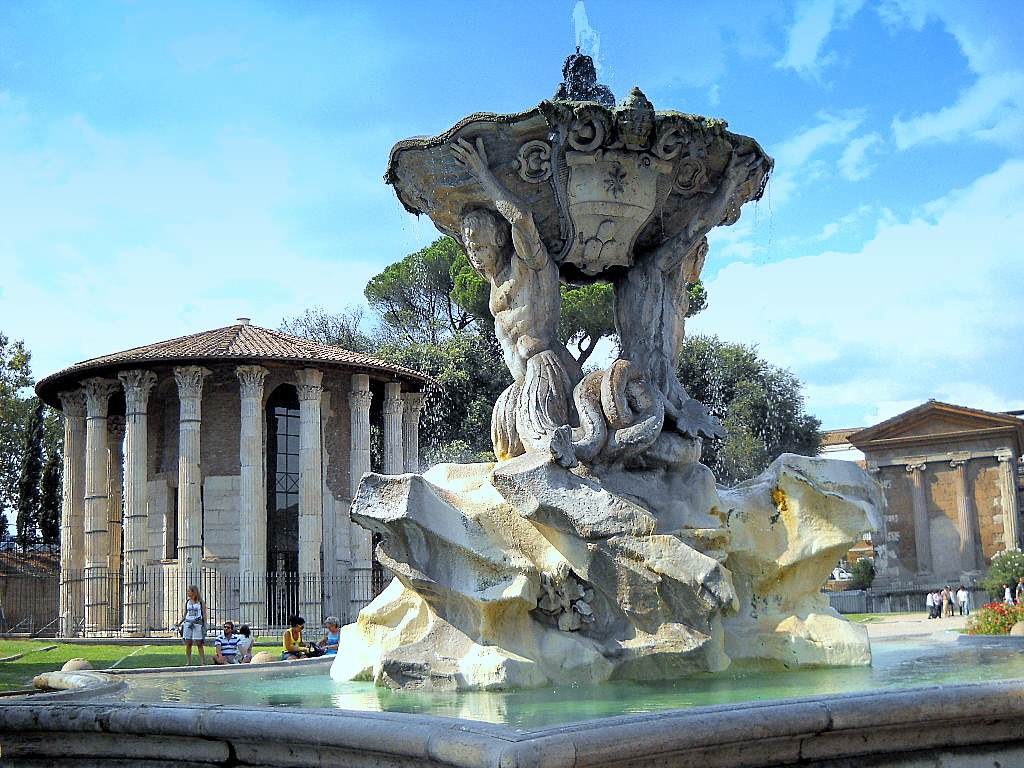
The fountain and the Temples of Hercules Victor and Portunus in the background

The building, starting from 1610, of the last Roman aqueduct, the Acqua Paola, didn't move to the background the two aqueducts built just a few years before (the Aqua Virgo in 1570 and the Acqua Felice in 1586), which gave the possibility to erect new fountains on the branches that guaranteed a more widespread distribution of water in the whole town. A secondary branch of the Acqua Felice reached the area south of the Tiber Island: here, between ancient and middle-age monuments (the Arcus Argentariorum, the Arch of Janus, the Temple of Hercules Victor, the Temple of Portunus and the basilica of Santa Maria in Cosmedin).

Pope Clement XI ordered the construction of a monument in his own memory. It is not clear why the pontiff chose to erect a fountain in an area that was scarcely inhabited, broken-grounded and subject to the floods of the Tiber. In fact, its fulfillment raised many criticisms for the location was believed to be unsatisfactory.

On 11 August 1717, the foundation stone of the new fountain was laid. The fountain was designed by architect Carlo Bizzaccheri, during the works for the accommodation of the square in front of the basilica. The whole travertine structure is placed on a circular step (delimited by 16 little columns joined by a grating), within which the design of the main basin represents an octagon with concave sides, or rather the eight-tips star that was the heraldic symbol of the family of the Pope, the Albanis). In the centre there is a group of rocks (an element that had become popular after the success of the fontana dei Quattro Fiumi) with bushes on which two Tritons, sculpted by Francesco Moratti, kneel with entwined tails and raised arms, sustaining on their shoulders a big oyster shell serving as upper basin. Between the two Tritons there is the coat of arms of the pontiff.

Four mascarons formerly dumped water into the main basin; they were removed in the 19th century, probably due to the scarcity of the incoming water. In fact the fountain has been without water for a long time, but the hydric provision, though quite scarce, has been restored.

The last restorations date back to 1994–1995 and 2010.

== Bibliography ==
- Sergio Delli, “Le fontane di Roma”, Schwarz & Meyer Ed., Roma, 1985

| Preceded by Trevi Fountain | Landmarks of Rome; Fountain of the Tritons | Succeeded by Fontana del Tritone, Rome |
