= Piazza Bocca della Verità =

Square in Rome, Italy

- City square
- {{{other_names}}}
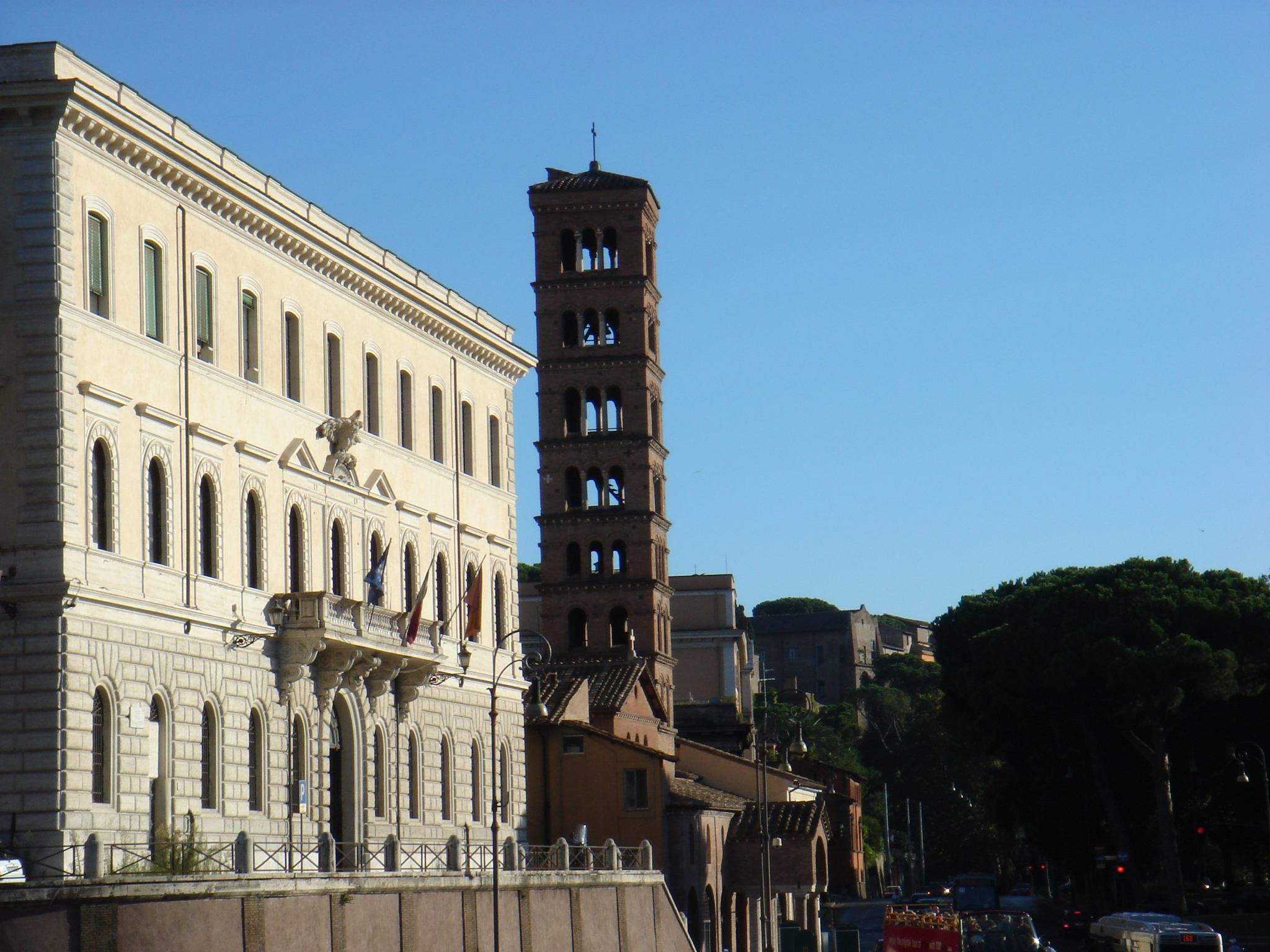
- Palazzo Pantanella, Santa Maria in Cosmedin
- Location: Rome, Italy
- Interactive map of Piazza Bocca della Verità
- Coordinates: 41°53′20.17″N 12°28′53.23″E

Piazza Bocca della Verità (Italian: Square of the Mouth of Truth) is a square between Via Luigi Petroselli and Via della Greca in Rome (Italy), in the rione Ripa.

The square lies in the ancient area of the Forum Boarium, the cattle market of ancient Rome, just in front of the Tiber Island. It takes its name from the Bocca della Verità (Italian: Mouth of Truth), placed under the portico of the church of Santa Maria in Cosmedin, built over the Ara Maxima of Hercules.

Besides the church, dating back to the late Middle Ages, the square houses the Arcus Argentariorum, the Arch of Janus, the Temple of Hercules Victor and the Temple of Portunus, a deity related to the ancient river harbour.

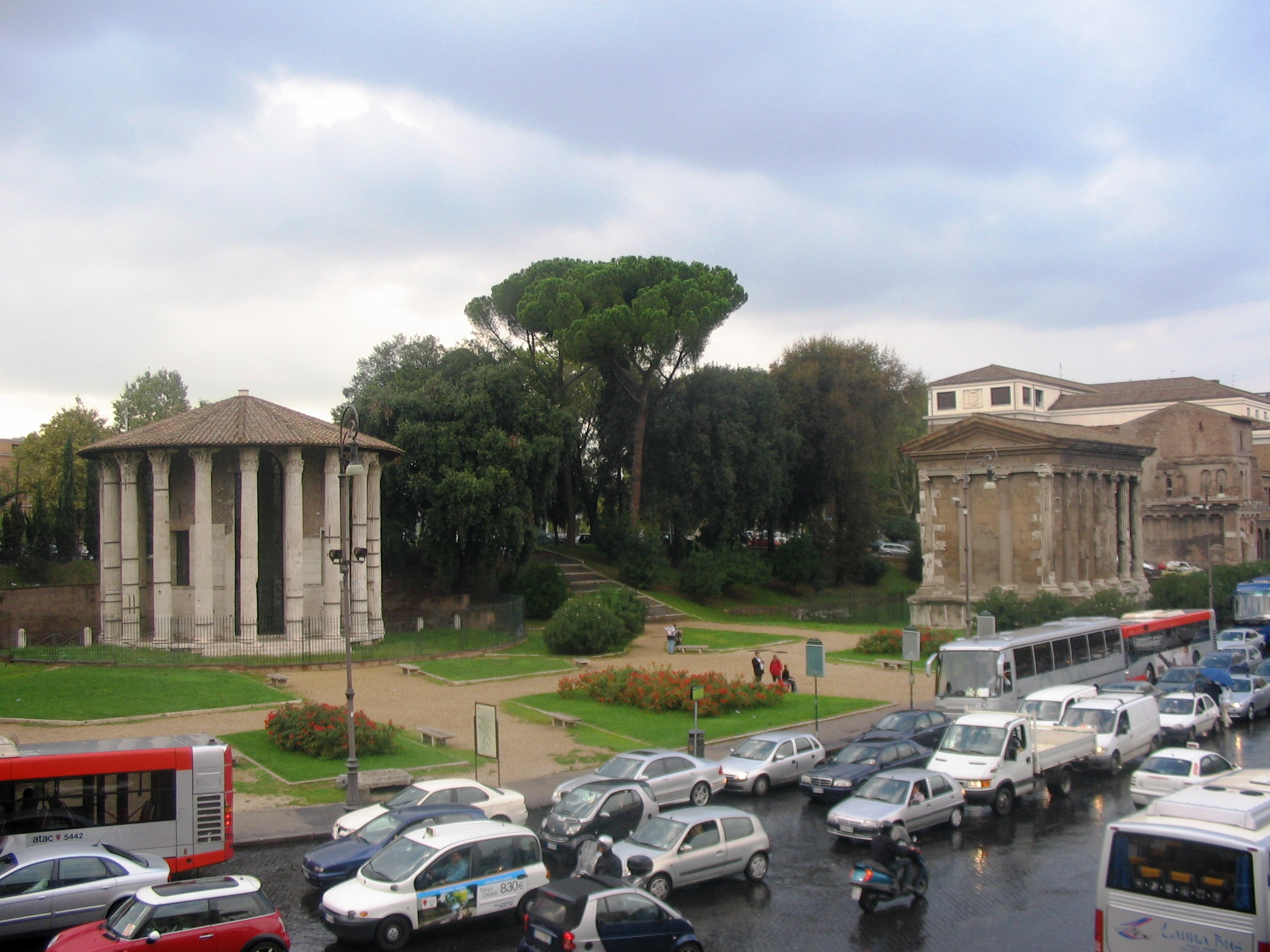
Piazza Bocca della Verità: the Temple of Hercules Victor and the Temple of Portunus

The fountain in front of the two temples, called Fountain of the Tritons, realised by Carlo Bizzaccheri under commission of Pope Clement XI, was erected in the square in 1715; it has an octagonal basis and portrays two tritons supporting a shell from which the water springs.

The square was the place where, until 1868, the sentences of death were executed.

== Bibliography ==
- Rossella Motta, Conservazione, demolizione, ricostruzione di strutture medioevali lungo la via del Mare tra la piazza Montanara e piazza Bocca della Verità in Gli anni del Governatorato (1926-1944), Collection Quaderni dei monumenti, Rome, Edizioni Kappa, 1995. ISBN 88-7890-181-4.
