= Fontana del Tritone, Rome =

Fountain in Rome

Fontana del Tritone
- Fountain
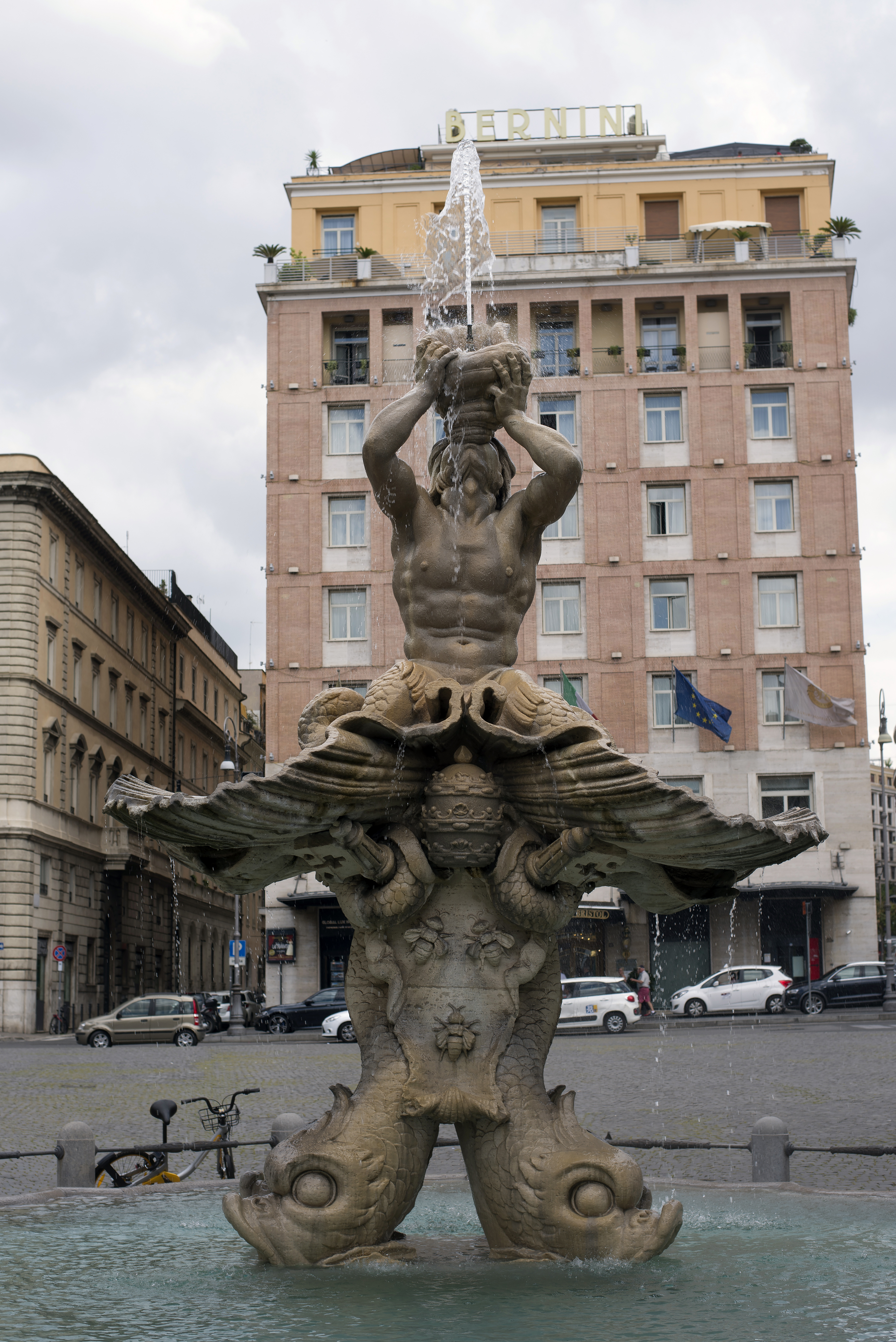
- Fontana del Tritone by Gian Lorenzo Bernini
- Design: Gian Lorenzo Bernini
- Location: Piazza Barberini, Rome, Italy
- Interactive map of Fontana del Tritone
- Coordinates: 41°54′13″N 12°29′18″E

Fontana del Tritone (Triton Fountain) is a seventeenth-century fountain in Rome, by the Baroque sculptor Gian Lorenzo Bernini. Commissioned by his patron, Pope Urban VIII, the fountain is located in the Piazza Barberini, near the entrance to the Palazzo Barberini (which now houses the Galleria Nazionale d'Arte Antica) that Bernini helped to design and construct for the Barberini, Urban's family. (Note: The Palazzo Barberini was built according to a plan by the architect Carlo Maderno. When Maderno died in 1629, Bernini took over supervising its construction. Both the fountain and palace are close to Borromini's San Carlo alle Quattro Fontane) This fountain should be distinguished from the nearby Fontana dei Tritoni (Fountain of the Tritons) by Carlo Francesco Bizzaccheri in Piazza Bocca della Verità which features two Tritons.

== Description ==
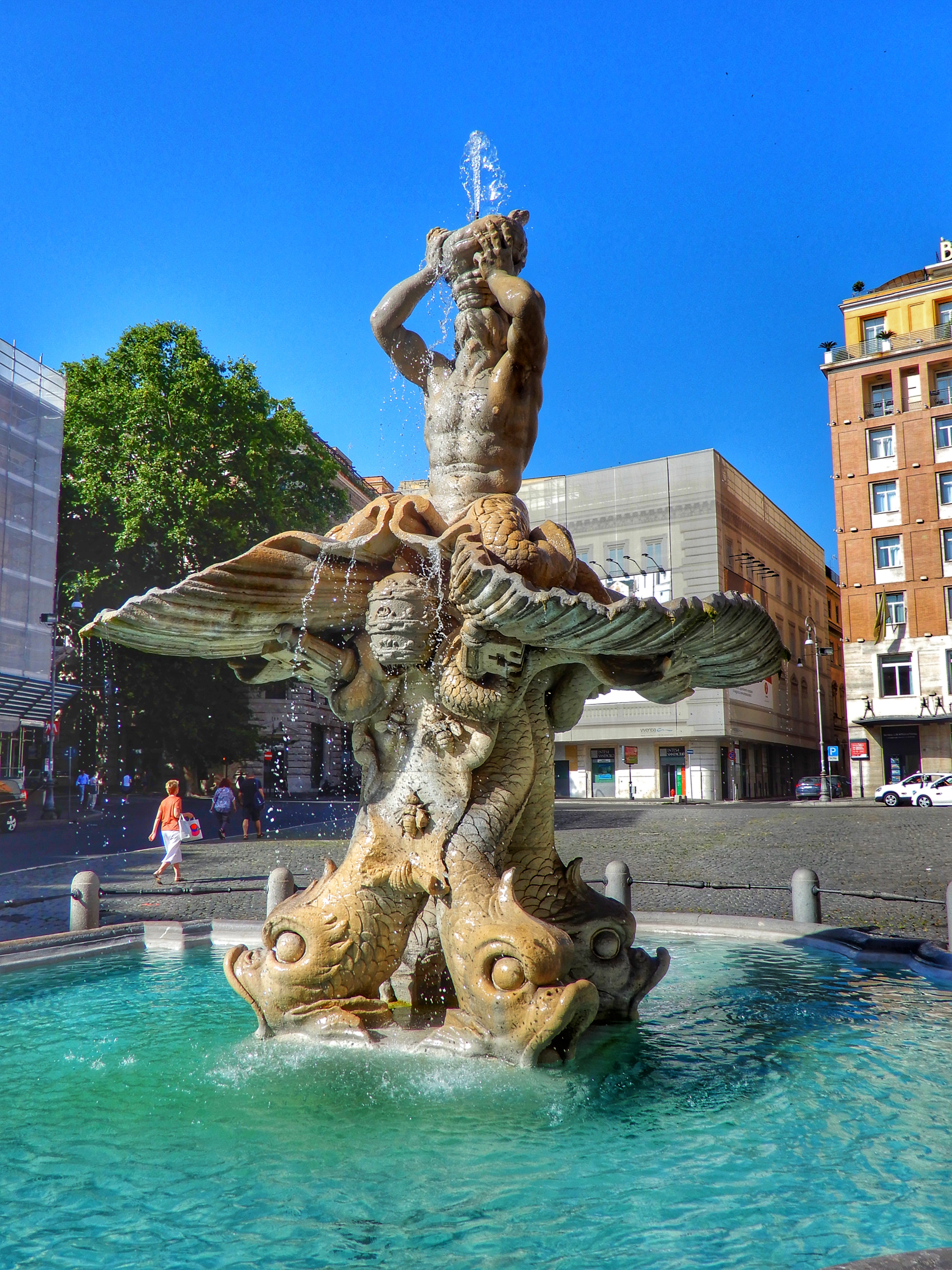
Fontana del Tritone

The fountain was executed in travertine in 1642–43. Pope Urban VIII wanted a public ornament for the city and also a utility service to place in the center of the square dominated by his family's brand-new palace. At its centre rises a larger than lifesize muscular Triton, a minor sea god of ancient Greco-Roman legend, depicted as a merman kneeling on a large shell, from which the Triton rises. His head is thrown back and his arms raise a conch to his lips; from it a jet of water spurts, formerly rising dramatically higher than it does today. The fountain has a base of four dolphins (Note: The dolphins are represented in their heraldic conventionalization, not as they appear in nature.) that entwine the papal tiara with crossed keys and the heraldic Barberini bees in their scaly tails. (Note: Two finished terracotta bozzetti at the Detroit Institute of Arts, (accession numbers 52.218 and 52.219) securely attributed to Bernini, reflect his exploration of the fountain's themes of the intertwined upended dolphins and the muscular, scaly-tailed Triton.)

The Tritone, the first of Bernini's free-standing urban fountains, was erected to provide water from the Acqua Felice aqueduct which Urban had restored. It was Bernini's last major commission from his great patron who died in 1644. At the Triton Fountain, Urban and Bernini brought the idea of a sculptural fountain, familiar from villa gardens, decisively to a public urban setting for the first time; previous public fountains in the city of Rome had been passive basins for the reception of public water.

Bernini has represented the triton to illustrate the triumphant passage from Ovid's Metamorphoses book I, evoking godlike control over the waters and describing the draining away of the Universal Deluge. The passage that Urban set Bernini to illustrate, was well known to all literate Roman contemporaries:

Already Triton, at his call, appears
Above the waves; a Tyrian robe he wears;
And in his hand a crooked trumpet bears.
The sovereign bids him peaceful sounds inspire,
And give the waves the signal to retire.
His writhen shell he takes; whose narrow vent
Grows by degrees into a large extent,
Then gives it breath; the blast with doubling sound,
Runs the wide circuit of the world around:
The sun first heard it, in his early east,
And met the rattling echoes in the west.
The waters, list'ning to the trumpet's roar,
Obey the summons, and forsake the shore.

—free translation by Sir Samuel Garth, John Dryden, et al..

The following year, Bernini sculpted the Fontana delle Api (Fountain of the Bees), a watering trough where the Via Veneto enters the Piazza Barberini. Both fountains were constructed around the time of the First War of Castro. Matthew K. Averett sees a political statement in their construction: as Urban restoring peace after an unfortunate but necessary conflict.

== Subsequent history ==
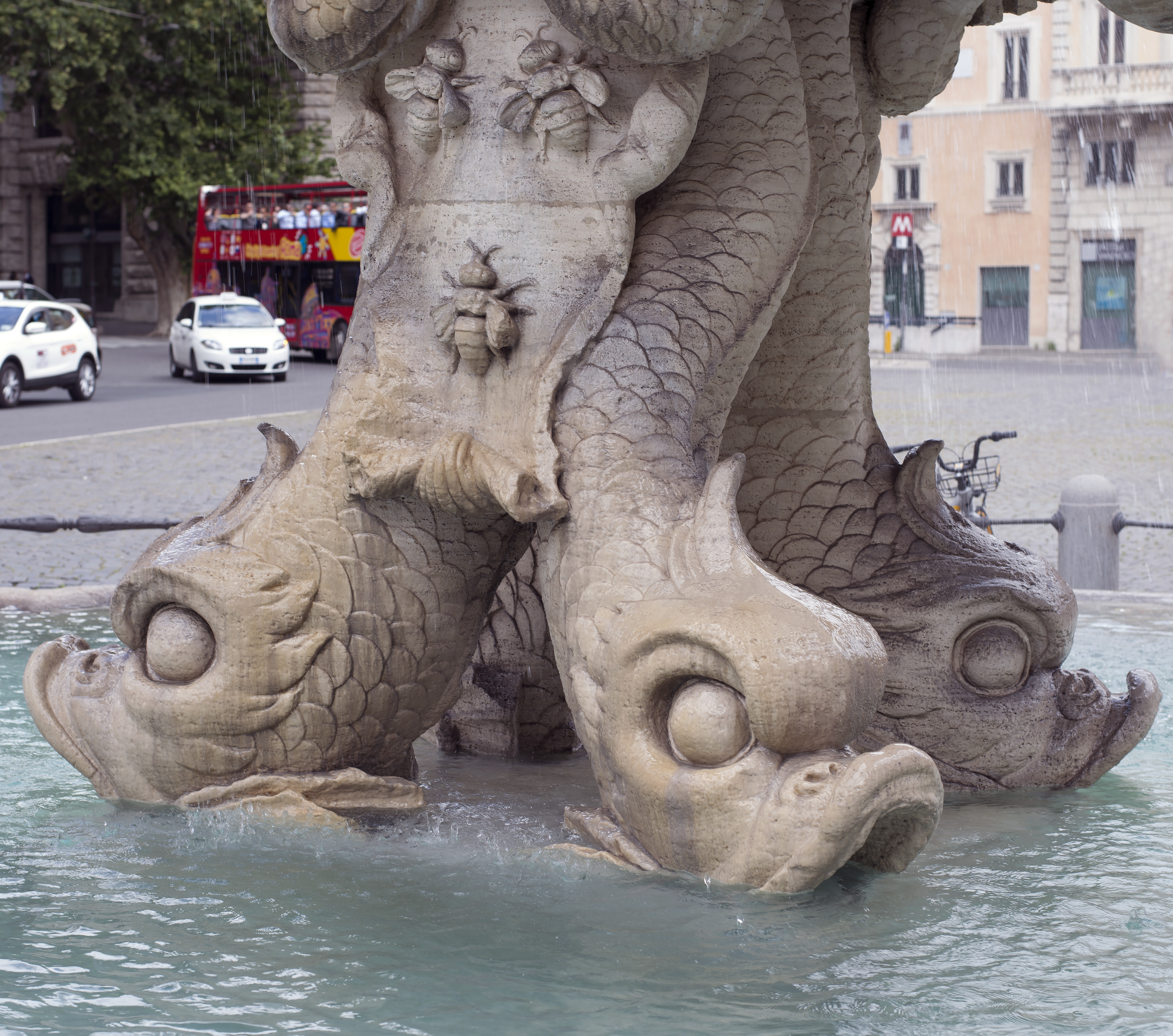
Fontana del Tritone dolphins heads

The Triton Fountain is one of those evoked in Ottorino Respighi's Fontane di Roma. The legend applied to Trevi Fountain has been extended to this: that any visitor who throws a coin into the water (while facing away from the fountain) will have guaranteed their return to Rome.

The setting of the Piazza Barberini has changed significantly since the seventeenth century. Engravings of the time and photographs from the nineteenth century show much lower buildings around the piazza, which would have made the fountain much more dramatic. However, it is a tribute to the artistic judgement of Bernini that even now, with tall buildings around the traffic-ridden piazza, the Triton Fountain can still maintain a dramatic presence.

== See also ==
- List of fountains in Rome
- List of works by Gian Lorenzo Bernini

== Notes ==
Preceded by Fountain of the Tritons	Landmarks of Rome; Fontana del Tritone, Rome	Succeeded by Victor Emmanuel II Monument
