= Fontana delle Api =

Fountain designed by Gianlorenzo Bernini

- Fountain
- {{{other_names}}}
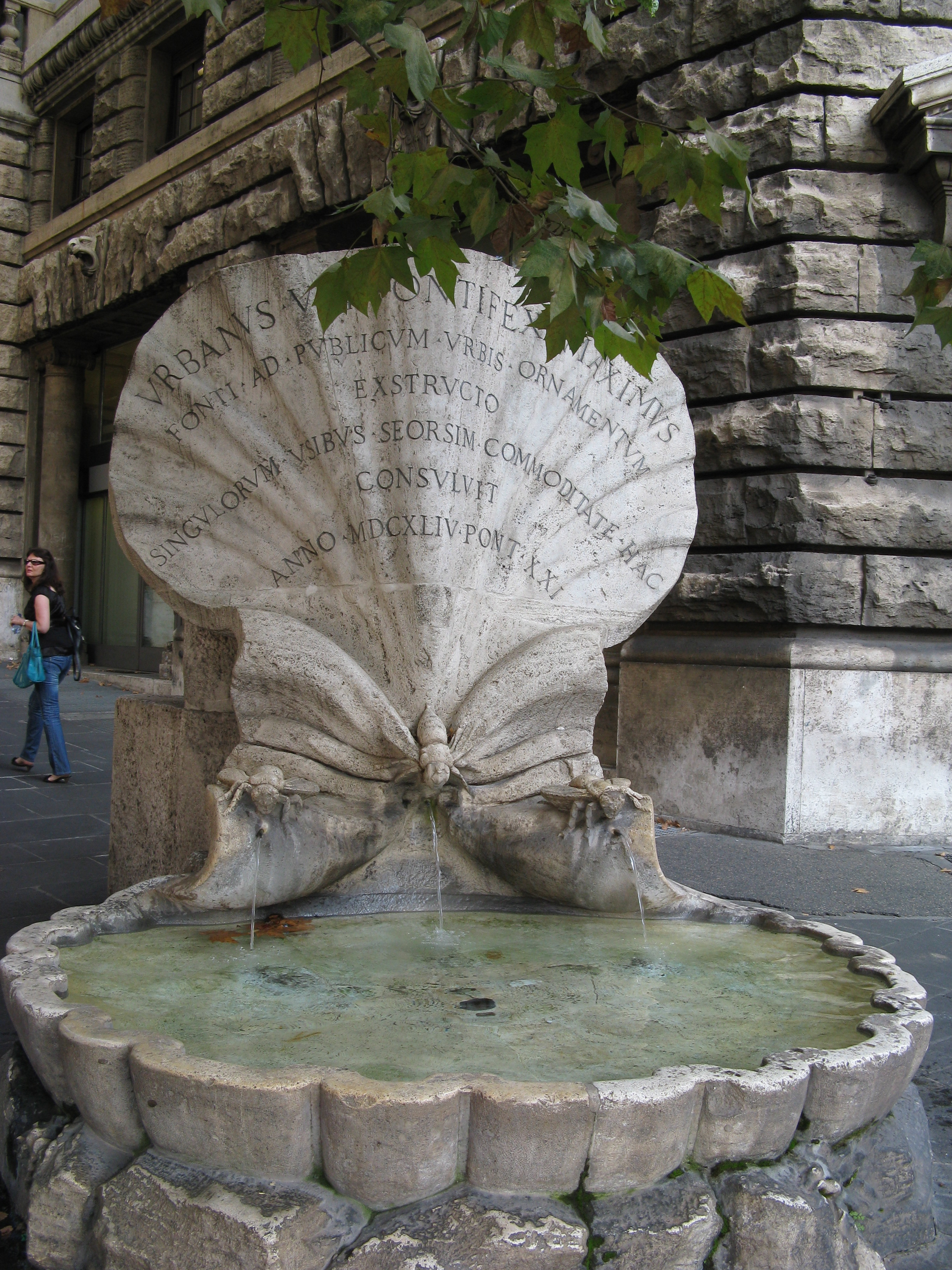
- Fontana delle Api by Gian Lorenzo Bernini.
- Design: Gian Lorenzo Bernini
- Location: Piazza Barberini, Rome, Italy
- Interactive map of Fontana delle Api
- Coordinates: 41°54′15.5″N 12°29′19.4″E

Fontana delle Api (Fountain of the Bees) is a fountain located in the Piazza Barberini in Rome where the Via Veneto enters the piazza. It was sculpted by Gian Lorenzo Bernini and completed in April 1644.

== History ==
Within months of the completion of the Triton fountain, Pope Urban VIII commissioned Gian Lorenzo Bernini to build a small fountain for public use that would serve the function of "beveratore delli cavalli" (horse trough). The work was completed in the same year, and in honor of the pope the artist represented on the fountain the Bees, the heraldic symbol of the Barberini family.

Initially placed at the corner of Palazzo Soderini, between Piazza Barberini and Via Sistina, the fountain was disassembled in 1880 for reasons of traffic obstruction, dismantled and placed in the Testaccio municipal depot. However, in 1915, when it was decided to rebuild it, most of the pieces were no longer found, and a copy was commissioned from Adolfo Apolloni, who instead of the original Luna marble employed travertine from the demolished Porta Salaria. Thus renovated, the fountain was inaugurated on January 28, 1916, in its present location at the entrance to Via Veneto from Piazza Barberini.

== Description ==
Fontana delle Api consists of a marble bi-valve shell with three bees of the same material resting on it. The fountain was intended to be a watering trough for horses. An inscription on the shell reads, "Urban VIII Pont. Max., having built a fountain for the public ornamentation of the City, also built this little fountain to be of service to private citizens. In the year 1644, XXI of his pontificate." The "public ornamentation" referred to in the inscription is the Fontana del Tritone (Triton Fountain), which Bernini had completed the year before.

== See also ==
- List of fountains in Rome
- List of works by Gian Lorenzo Bernini

| Preceded by Villa Madama | Landmarks of Rome; Fontana delle Api | Succeeded by Fontana dell'Acqua Felice |
