= Piazza Barberini =

Public square in Rome, Italy

- City square
- {{{other_names}}}
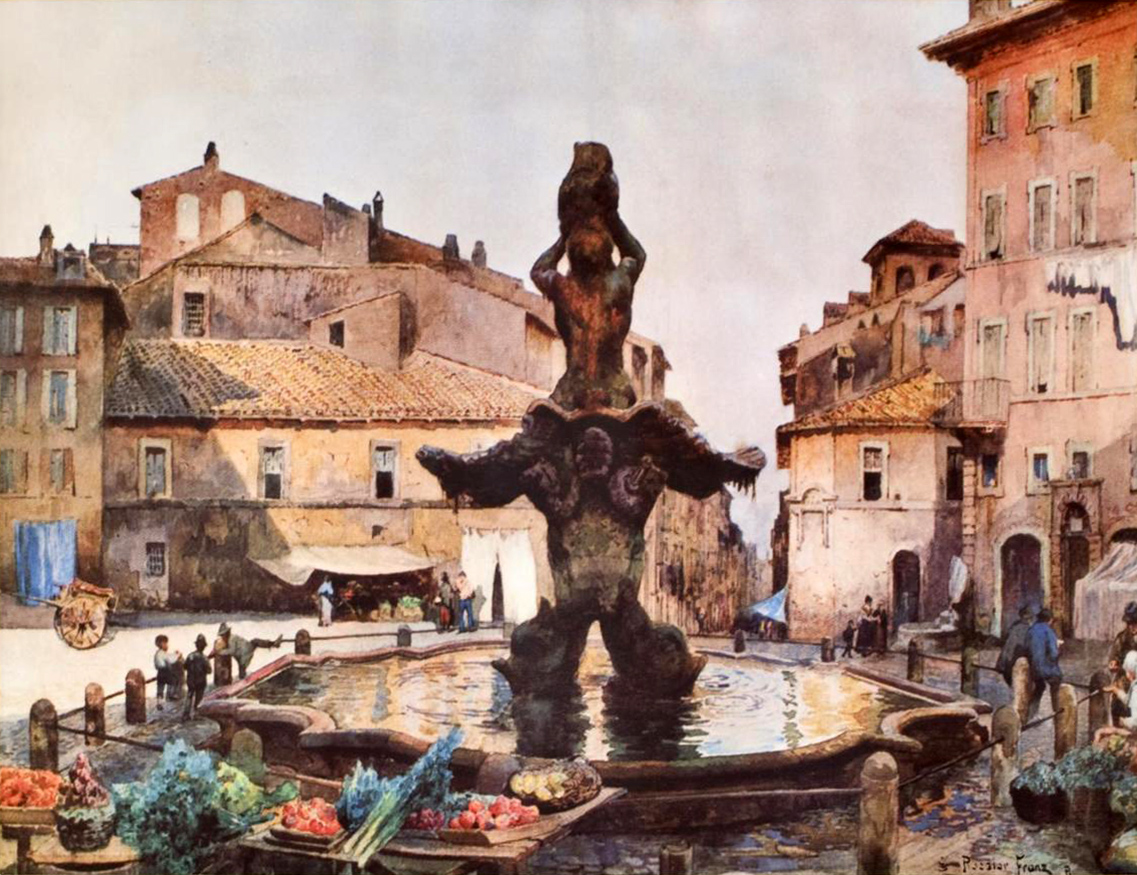
- Piazza Barberini, painted by Ettore Roesler Franz around 1880, featuring the Triton Fountain.
- Location: Rome, Italy
- Interactive map of Piazza Barberini
- Coordinates: 41°54′13″N 12°29′18″E

Piazza Barberini is a large piazza in the centro storico or city center of Rome, Italy and situated on the Quirinal Hill. It was created in the 16th century but many of the surrounding buildings have subsequently been rebuilt.

== History ==
The square is on the site of the ancient circus of Flora, where floral games took place in May to celebrate springtime. The property was previously known as the "Piazza Grimana". It was purchased in 1625 by Cardinal Francesco Barberini in order to construct the Palazzo Barberini. The substantial Baroque palace was built in an elevated position on the south side of the piazza. Originally, there was a large entrance gateway to the palace designed by the Baroque painter and architect Pietro da Cortona on the south east corner of the piazza but this was demolished to make way for the construction of a new road in the 19th century. However, its appearance is known from engravings and early photographs of the piazza. (Note: For early views of the piazza see Rome in Early Photographs 1846–1878. Photographs from the Roman and Danish Collections. Trans. Ann Thornton. Thorvaldsen Museum, Copenhagen, 1977, plates 59–64)

The Palazzo contained the "Teatro Barberini", built by Bernini in 1634, and intended as a court theatre. It was entered by way of a large arch.

At the centre of the piazza is the Fontana del Tritone or Triton Fountain (1642–3) sculpted by Bernini. Another fountain, the Fontana delle Api (1644), also by Bernini is in the nearby Via Vittorio Veneto but it has been reconstructed somewhat arbitrarily following its removal from its previous position on the corner of a palace where the Piazza Barberini meets the Via Sistina.

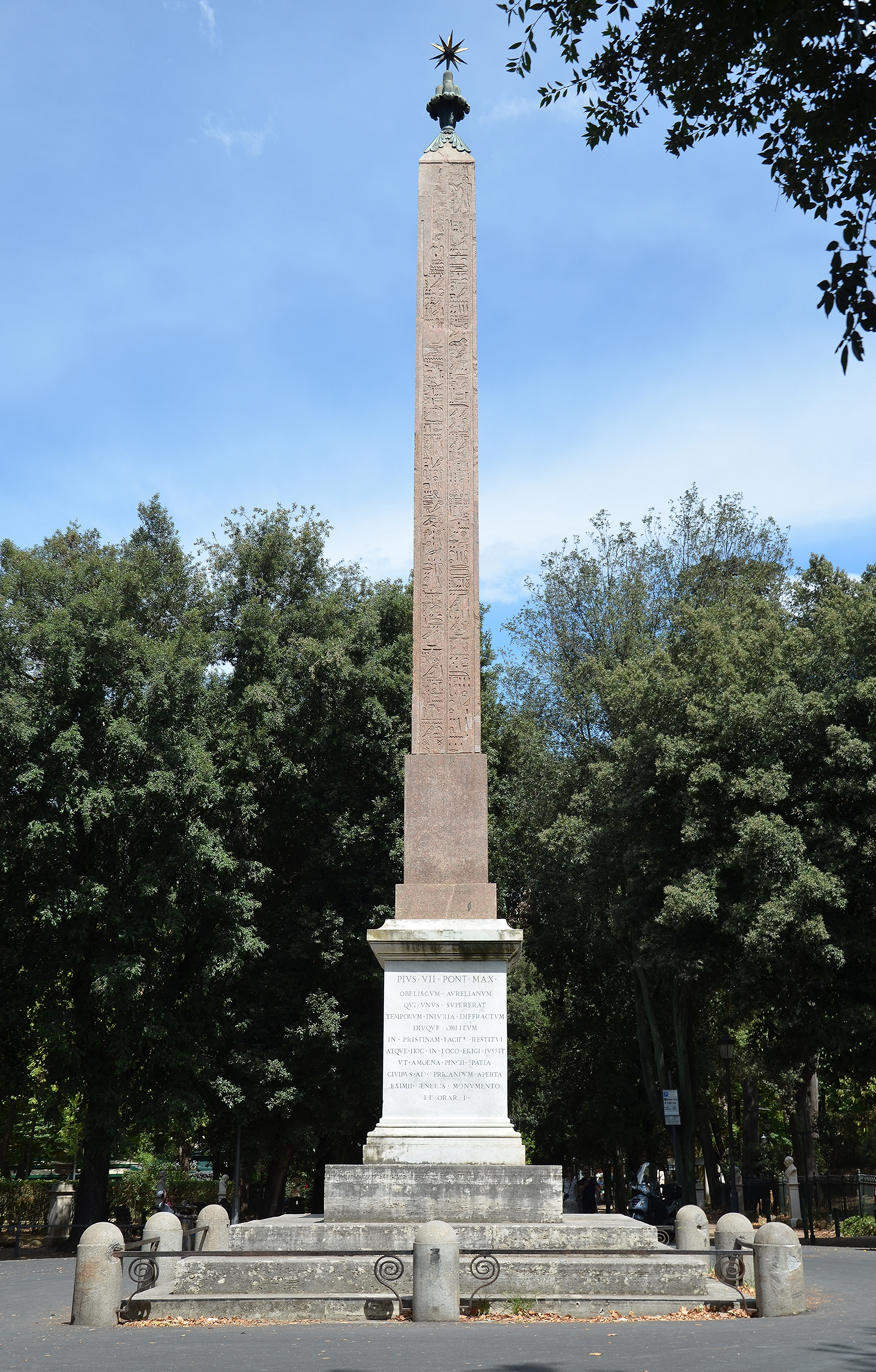
The Pincian Obelisk (South side), an obelisk commissioned by Hadrian between 130 and 136 AD

Until the 18th century, the piazza was one of the locations where unidentified corpses were displayed for the public to identify.

Between 1632 and 1822 an antique obelisk stood here. It was found in 1570 outside the Porta Maggiore. In 1632 it was acquired by Pope Urban VIII (Maffeo Barberini) for the grounds of his new family palazzo. In 1822 Pope Pius VII had it transferred to the gardens of the Villa Medici.

The piazza was the site of the start of the "Triumph of strawberries", a procession of carriages, carts, and agricultural floats adorned with strawberries and festoons of flowers with a statue of S.Antonio at the head. It was led by the oldest peasant to Piazza della Rotonda, where amid folk dancing, fresh strawberries were distributed to those present.

== Modern geography ==
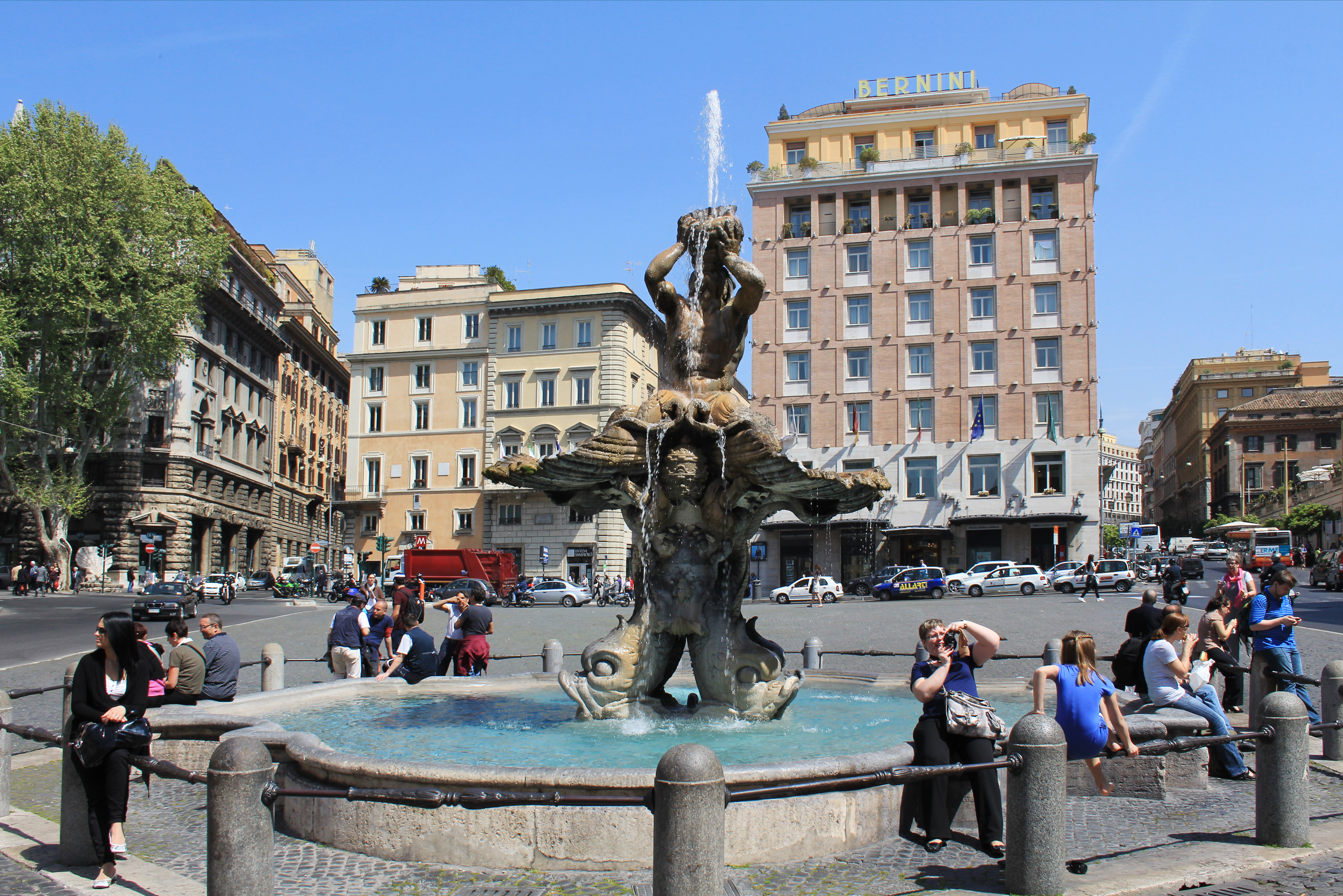
Piazza Barberini in 2011

In 1935 the Istituto Nazionale delle Assicurazioni (INA) bought the complex bounded by Piazza Barberini, Via Vittorio Veneto, Via dei Cappuccini (formerly Via Ferrea) and Via della Purificazione; but then had to fend off a purchase by the Giornale d’Italia, backed by the minister for the Press and Propaganda.

Today, the piazza is large crossroad for Rome's traffic and, since 1980, has accommodated a station on Line A of the Rome Metro, called Barberini – Fontana di Trevi.
