= Temple of Portunus =

Ancient Roman temple in Rome

- Aedes Portuni (Latin)
- Tempio di Portuno (Italian)
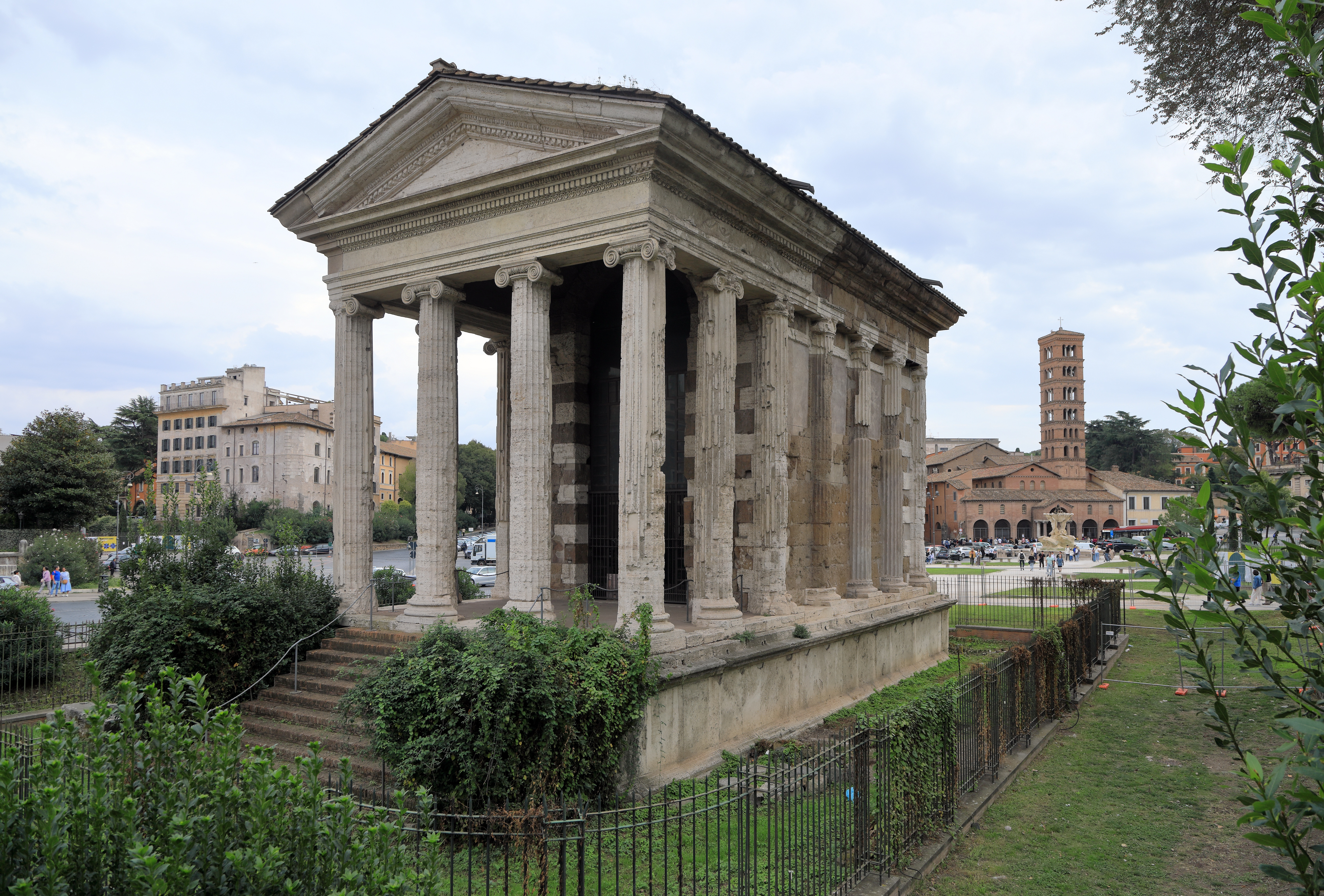
- Exterior of the Temple of Portunus

- Shown within Augustan Rome
- Click on the map for a fullscreen view
- 41°53′21″N 12°28′51″E
- Location: Regio XI Circus Maximus, Rome, Italy

History
- Built: c. 120–80 BCE

Site notes
- Area: Forum Boarium

The Temple of Portunus (Italian: Tempio di Portuno) is a small ancient Roman temple in Rome, Italy, on the modern Piazza della Bocca della Verità (Rione XII, Ripa). It was built beside the ancient Forum Boarium, the Roman cattle market associated with Hercules, which was adjacent to Rome's oldest river port (Portus Tiberinus) and the oldest stone bridge across the Tiber River, the Pons Aemilius. It is theorized that it was dedicated to the Roman god Portunus although the precise dedication remains unclear as there were several temples nearby also with ambiguous dedications. It was misidentified as the Temple of Fortuna Virilis (Latin for "Manly Luck") from the Renaissance and remains better known by this name. The temple is one of the best preserved of all Roman temples.

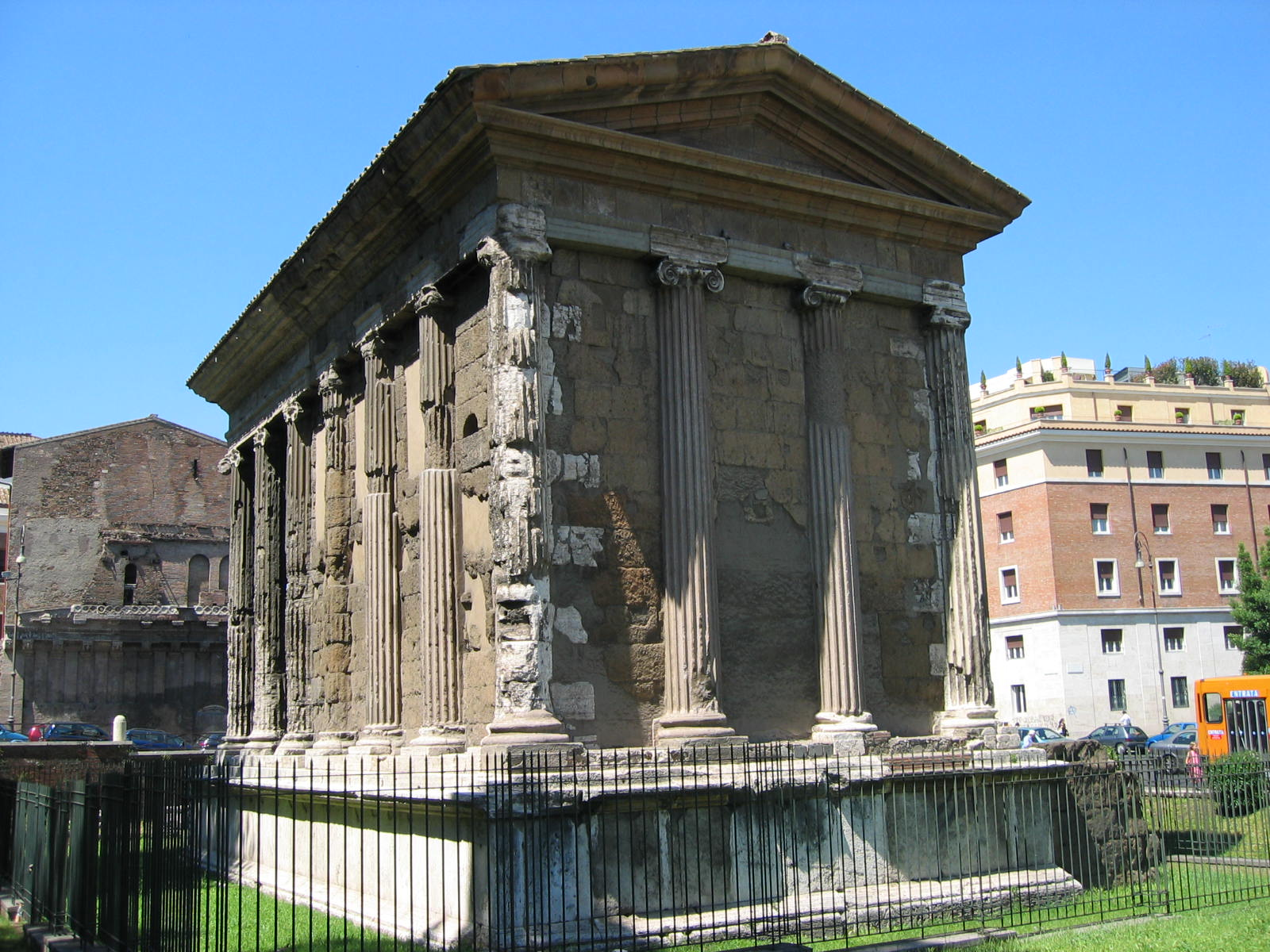
Rear view

It is the most prominent temple in Rome dedicated to Portunus, the god of keys, doors and livestock, and granaries. During the Middle Ages, the temple was converted to a Christian church dedicated to Santa Maria Egyziaca or Saint Mary of Egypt, which was the national church for the Armenian community in Rome. The legend on Giovanni Battista Piranesi's veduta of about 1770 says it had the popular name of the "House of Pilate". It remained an active church until the early 20th century, when it was deconsecrated, stripped of all surrounding medieval and Renaissance era buildings, and returned to its classical appearance. It is not ordinarily open to the public, though the exterior can be seen from fairly close up.

== Architecture ==
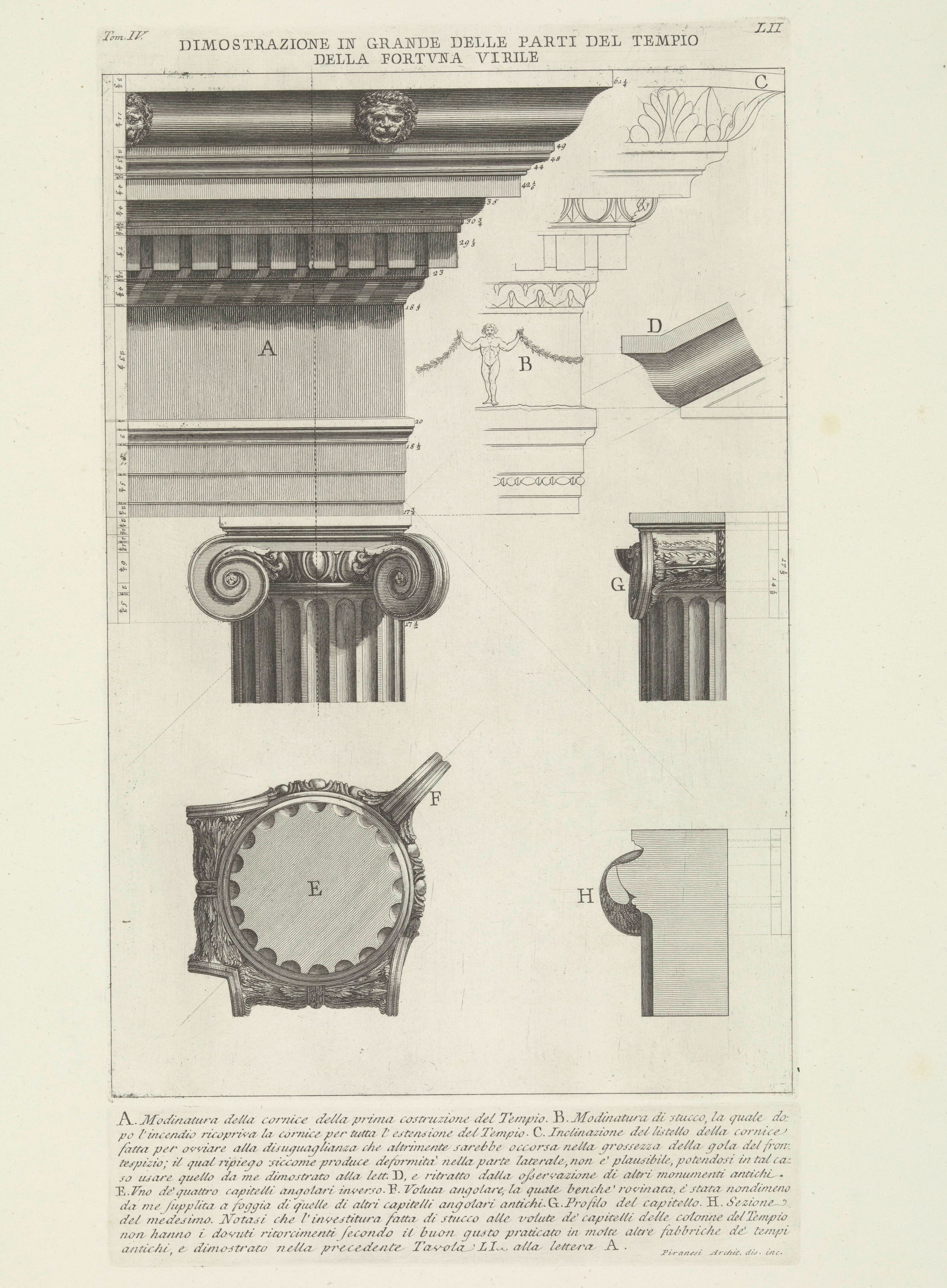
Architectural details by Giovanni Battista Piranesi

It is in the Ionic order and is by the ancient Forum Boarium by the Tiber. During Antiquity the site overlooked the Tiberine port at a sharp bend in the river; from here, Portunus watched over cattle barges as they entered the city from Ostia.

The temple was originally built in the 3rd or 4th century BC and was rebuilt between 120 and 80 BC. The rectangular building consists of a tetrastyle portico and cella, raised on a high podium reached by a flight of steps, which it retains. Like the Maison Carrée in Nîmes, it has a pronaos portico of four Ionic columns across and two columns deep. The columns of the portico are free-standing, while the remaining five columns on the long sides and the four columns at the rear are half-columns engaged along the walls of the cella. This form is sometimes called pseudoperipteral, as distinct from a true peripteral temple like the Parthenon entirely surrounded by free-standing columns. The Ionic capitals are of the original form, different in the frontal and side views, except in the volutes at the corners, which project at 45°, a common Roman detail. It is built of tuff and travertine with a stucco surface.

If still in use by the 4th-century, the temple would have been closed during the persecution of pagans in the late Roman Empire. The temple owes its state of preservation to its being converted for use as a church in 872 and rededicated to Santa Maria Egiziaca (Saint Mary of Egypt). Its Ionic order has been much admired, drawn and engraved and copied since the 16th century. The original coating of stucco over its tufa and travertine construction has been lost.

The circular Temple of Hercules Victor is south-east of the temple in the Forum Boarium; it was also turned into a church, as Santa Maria del Sole, for many centuries.

The 18th century Temple of Harmony in Somerset, England is a folly based on the Temple of Portunus.

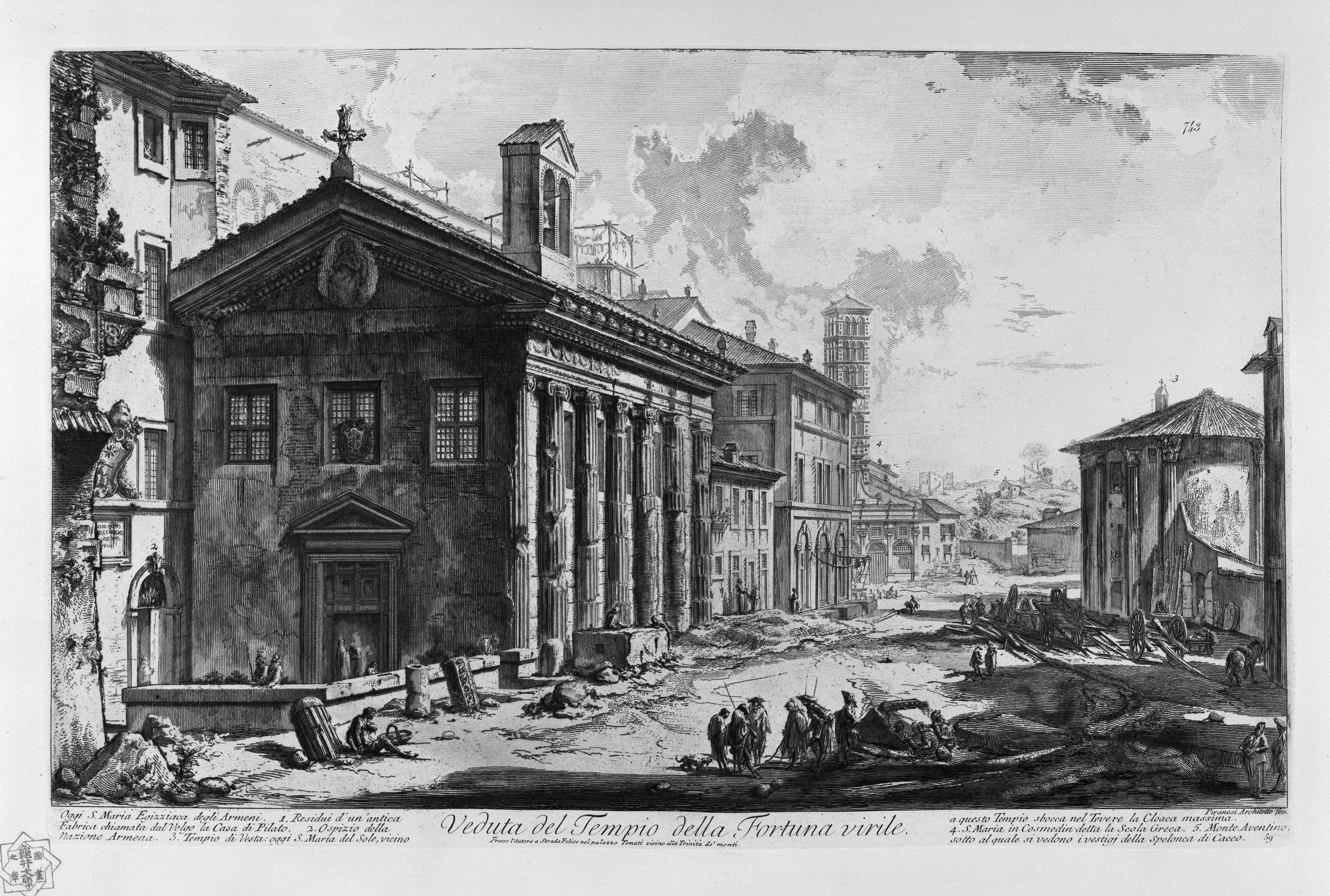
Veduta del Tempio della Fortuna virile, etching by Giovanni Battista Piranesi, c. 1770; the Temple of Hercules Victor to the right

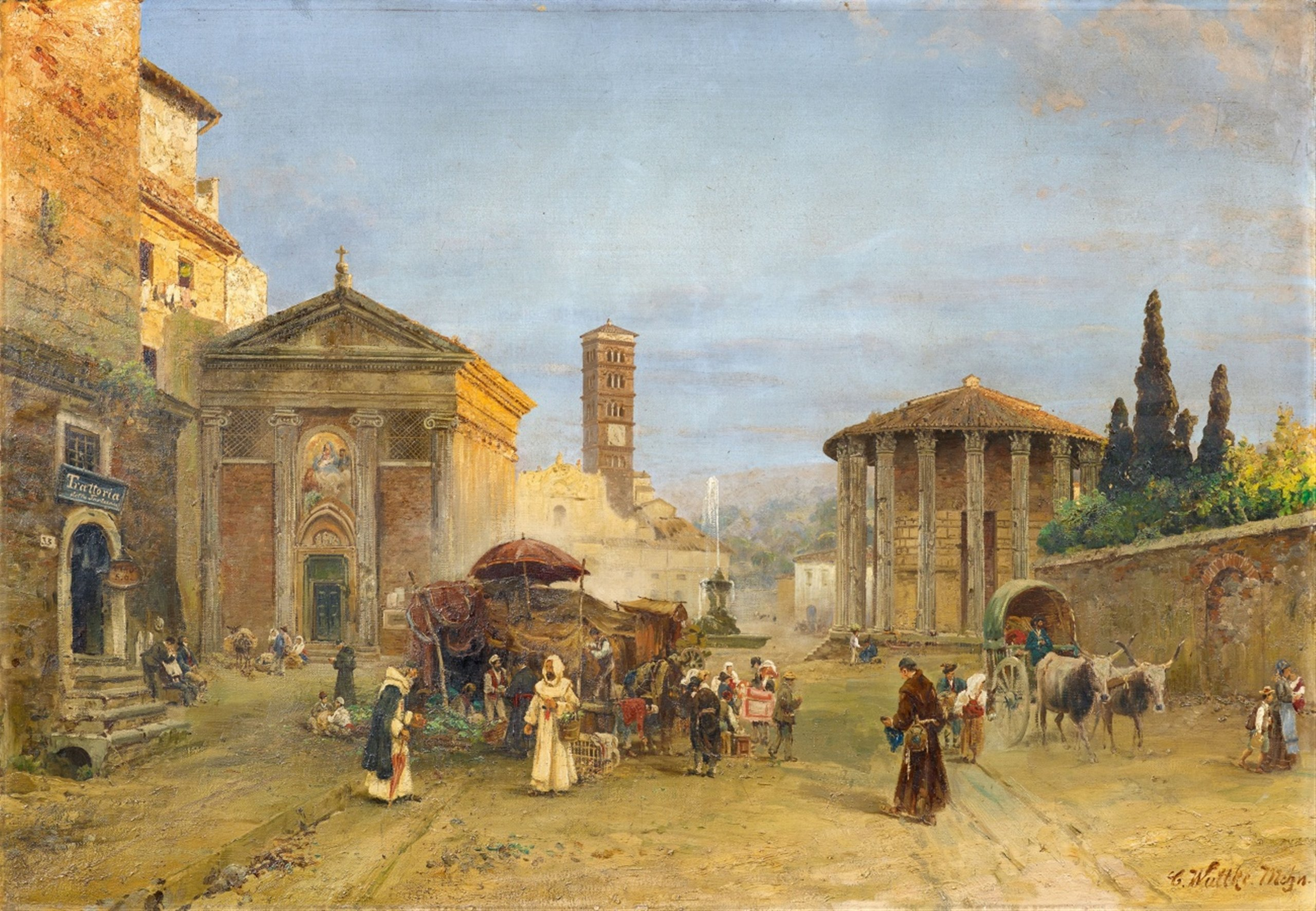
Late 19th-century painting by Carl Wuttke

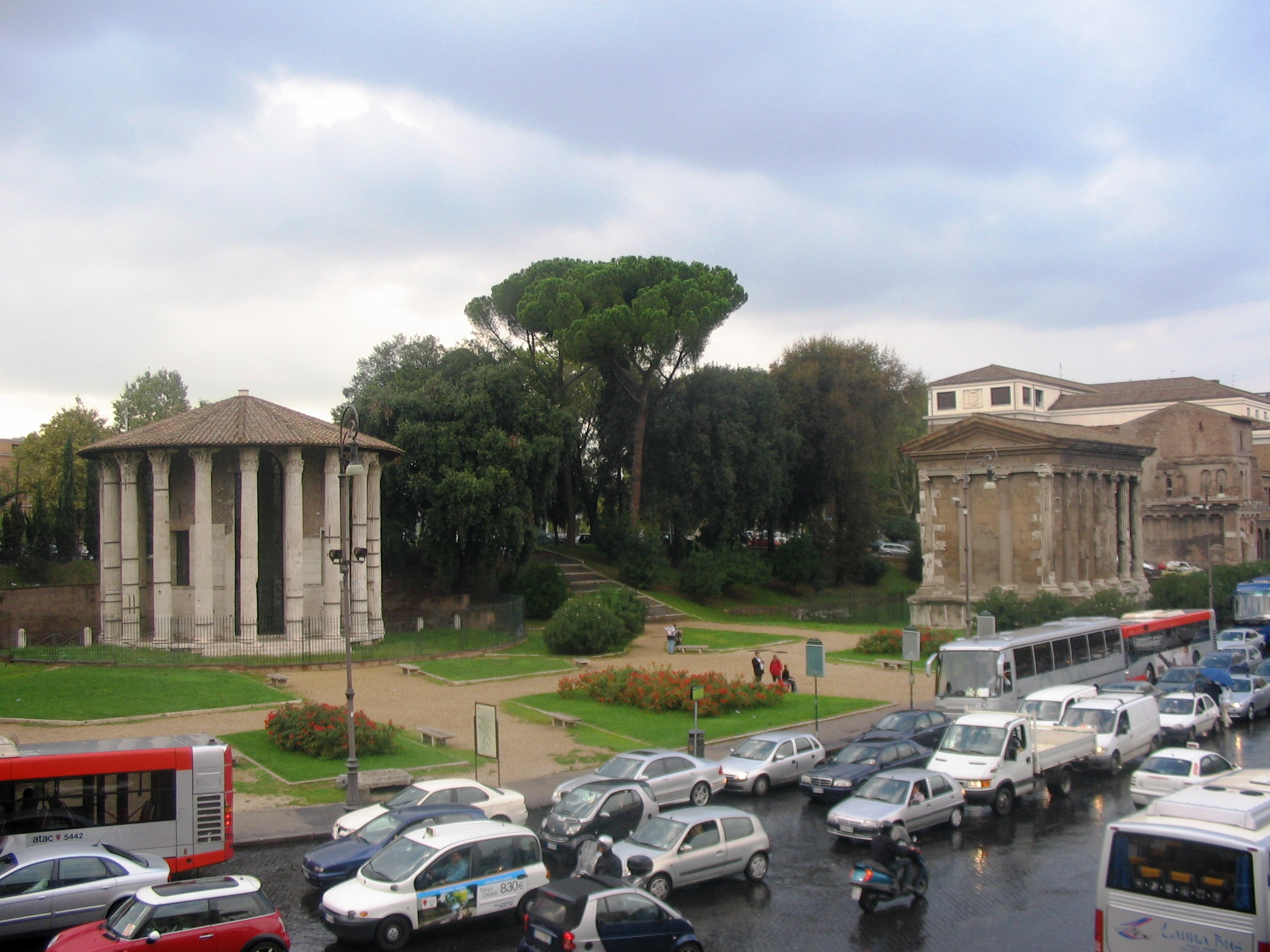
Piazza Bocca della verità, in 2005

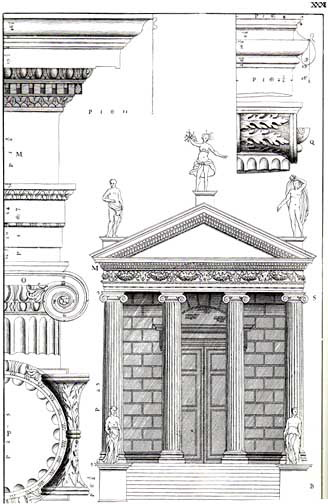
"The Temple of Fortuna Virilis" in Isaac Ware, The Four Books of Andrea Palladio's Architecture, London, 1738

== See also ==
- Temple of Saturn – Ancient religious monument in Rome, Italy
- List of ancient monuments in Rome
- List of Ancient Roman temples

Preceded by Temple of Minerva Medica	Landmarks of Rome; Temple of Portunus	Succeeded by Temple of Saturn
