= Great Altar of Hercules =

Altar for sacrifice to Hercules in ancient Rome

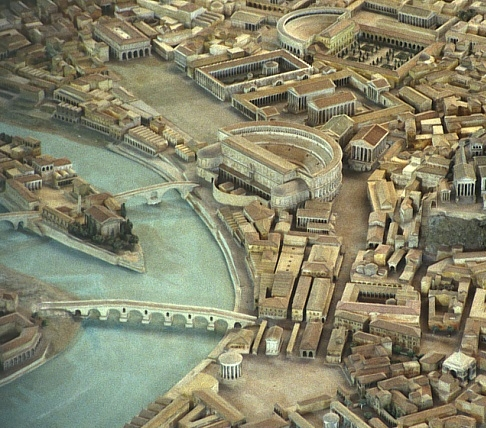
- The Forum Boarium and Temple of Hercules Victor in Gismondi's scale model of imperial Rome, visible near the lower edge of the photograph, Museum of Roman Civilization

- Shown within Augustan Rome
- Interactive map of Great Altar of Hercules
- 41°53′17″N 12°28′54″E

The Great Altar of Unconquered Hercules (Latin: Herculis Invicti Ara Maxima) (Note: Tacitus and Juvenal both refer to the altar as "great" (magna) instead of "extremely great" or "the greatest" (maxima).) stood in the Forum Boarium near the Tiber River in ancient Rome. It was the earliest cult location of Hercules in Rome, possibly originally dating as early as the 6th century bc. Its foundations possibly lie beneath the present church of Santa Maria in Cosmedin in Rome, Italy.

== Legend ==
Roman tradition held that Hercules completed his 10th labor in Italy, driving the cattle through Rome around the location of the latter cattle market (Forum Boarium). It made the location of the altar the place where Hercules slew Cacus and ascribed its creation to Evander of Pallene. Virgil's Aeneid includes a passage where Evander ascribes the origin even earlier, attributing it to Potitius and the Pinarii. (Note: See Winter for further treatment of the various foundation myths for the altar in surviving sources.)

== History ==
The altar was the earliest cult location for Hercules in Rome, predating the circular Temple of Hercules Victor and possibly originally dating as early as the 6th century BCE. The altar was destroyed during the Great Fire of Rome in the year 64 but was rebuilt and stood at least until the fourth century. The rites at the Ara Maxima were unique within the cult of Hercules in that they were performed in the Greek fashion (ritu Graeco) with uncovered heads. Surviving sources also state on the authority of Varro that women were excluded from the ceremonies at the altar and from partaking in the sacrificial meat.

== Present location ==
A tentative identification of a tuff platform in the crypt of Santa Maria in Cosmedin with the foundation of the altar has been made by Filippo Coarelli and other archaeologists.

== See also ==
- Hercules in Roman religion
- Temples of Hercules Victor and Hercules Musarum
- List of Ancient Roman temples & ancient monuments in Rome
