= Arcus Argentariorum =

Arch of the Argentarii
- Arcus Argentariorum
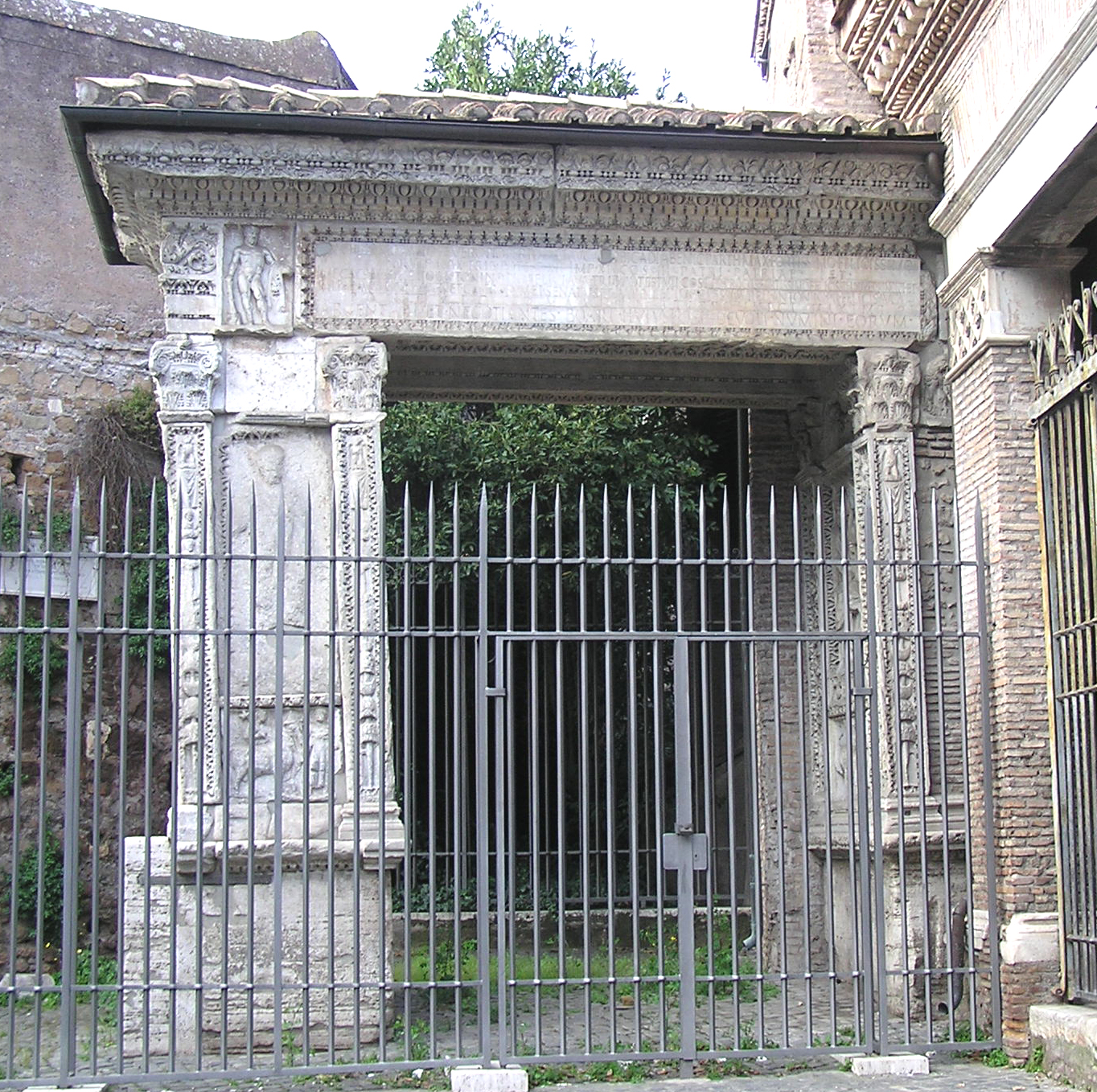
- The Arch of the Argentarii in Rome
- Interactive map of Arch of the Argentarii
- Location: Forum Boarium, Rome, Italy
- Coordinates: 41°53′22″N 12°28′59″E
- Builder: The argentarii (English: money-changers) of Rome
- Material: Travertine, Proconnesian marble, and concrete
- Height: 6.15 meters (20.2 ft)
- Completion date: 204 CE
- Dedicated to: Septimius Severus, Julia Domna, Caracalla, Geta (later erased)

The Arcus Argentariorum (English: Arch of the Argentarii; lit. 'Arch of the Money-Changers'; Italian: Arco degli Argentari), is an ancient Roman arch constructed by the argentarii in the Forum Boarium in 204 CE. It was partially incorporated into the western wall of the seventh-century church of San Giorgio al Velabro.

== Description ==
The arch is rectangular, more akin to an architrave than a typical triumphal arch, and originally measured 6.9 meters (23 ft) high. The opening between the interior reliefs measures 3.3 metres (11 ft) wide. The lower register is constructed of unadorned travertine, likely due to the frequency of cattle brushing against the sides. The upper register, reliefs, and inscription are carved from Proconnesian marble facing a concrete structure.

According to the inscription found on architrave, the argentarii dedicated the structure to members of the Severan dynasty, including Septimius Severus, Caracalla, Geta, Julia Domna, Fulvia Plautilla, and Gaius Fulvius Plautianus. However, after the murders of Plautianus in 205, Plautilla in 211, and Geta in 212, their dedications were erased from the structure in an act of damnatio memoriae. The inside of the arch depicts two reliefs of members of the Severan dynasty. On the east side, Septimius Severus serves as the pontifex maximus, while pouring a libation at an altar alongside his wife Julia Domna. Their son, Geta, was originally included in the relief, but his portrait was removed after Caracalla seized power and ordered his murder. Likewise, the west relief depicts Caracalla making a similar offering at an altar, but his wife Plautilla and father-in law Plautianus were chiselled off.

The inscription is flanked by two reliefs depicting Hercules holding a club and the skin of the Nemean lion and a genius representing the Roman people (Latin: Genius Populi Romani). Imperial imagery covers the remainder of the exterior, with reliefs depicting prisoners of war and various imperial insignia decorating outward facing sides of the archway. By contrast, the interior reliefs emphasize Roman religion using sacrificial imagery.

== Gallery ==
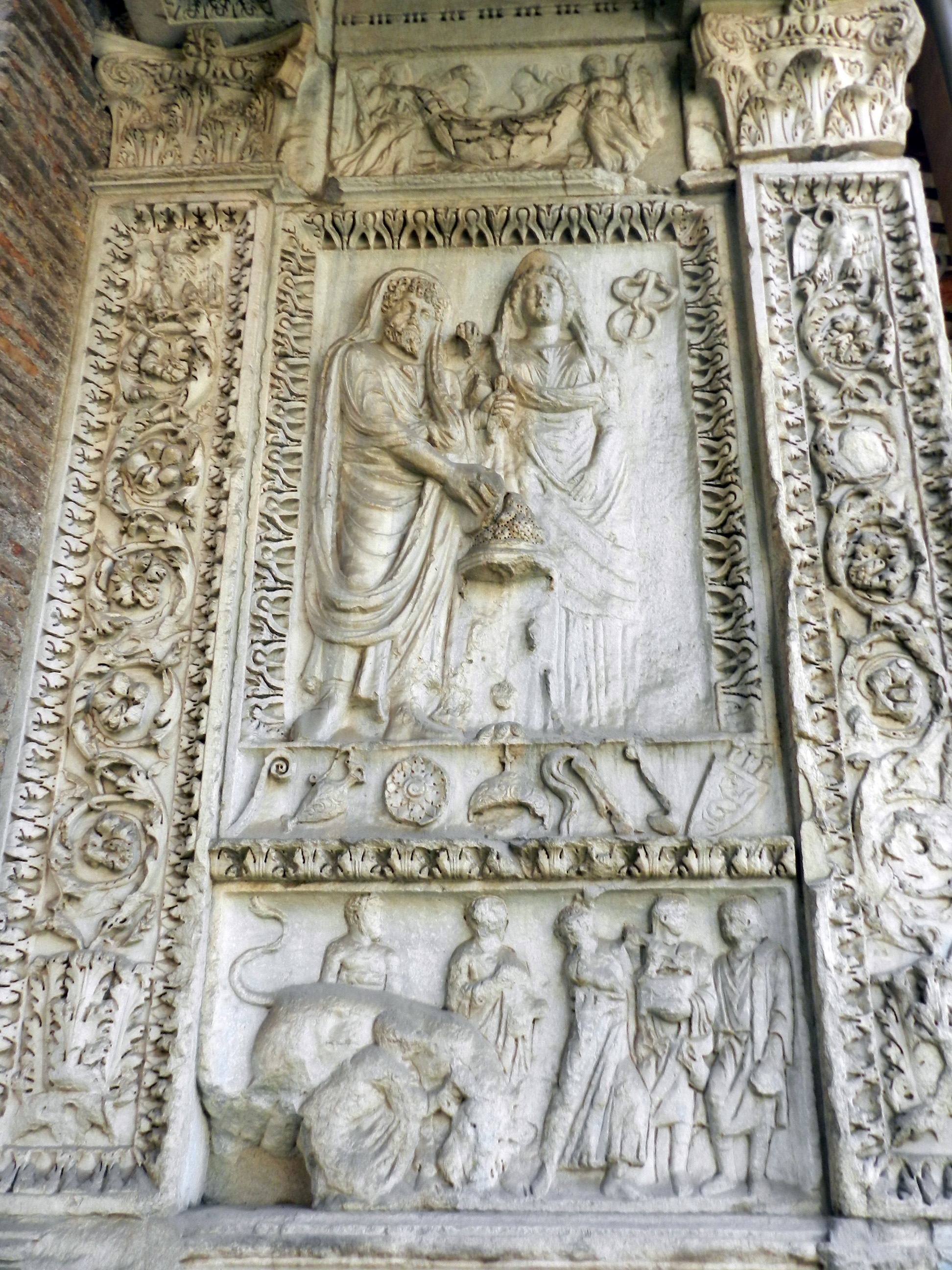
Sacrificial relief depicting Septimius Severus and Julia Domna

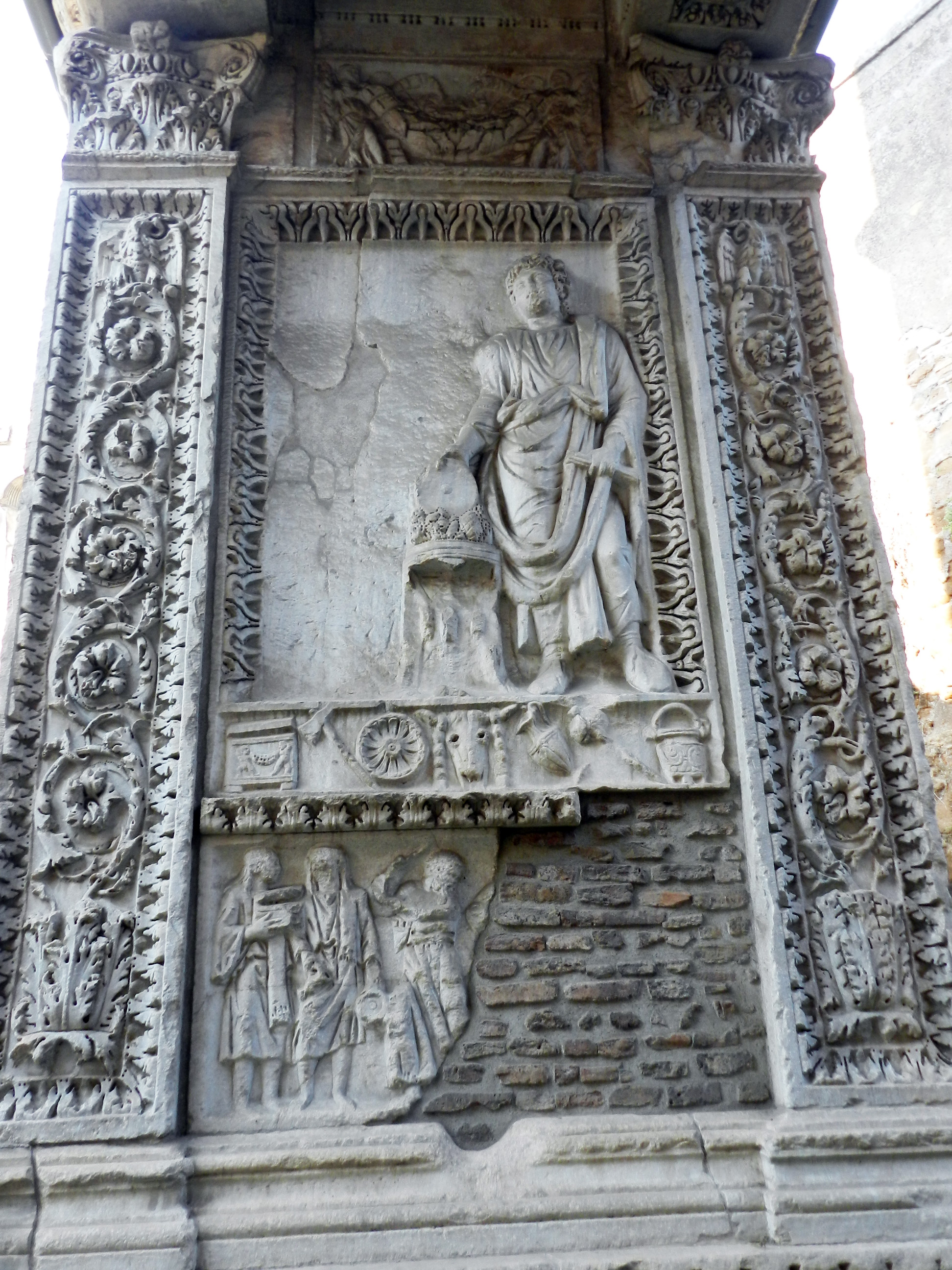
Sacrificial relief depicting Caracalla

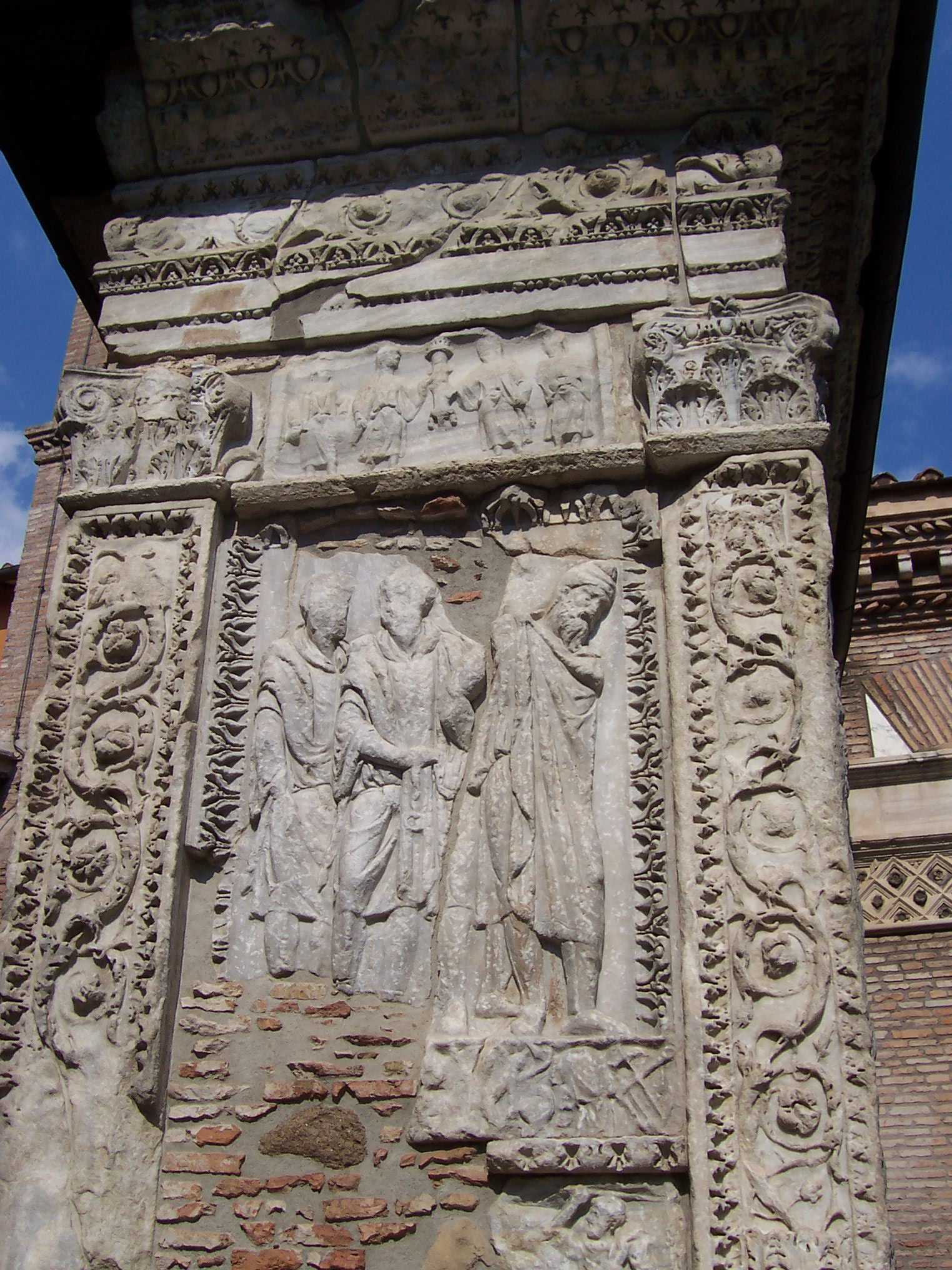
Relief depicting prisoners of war

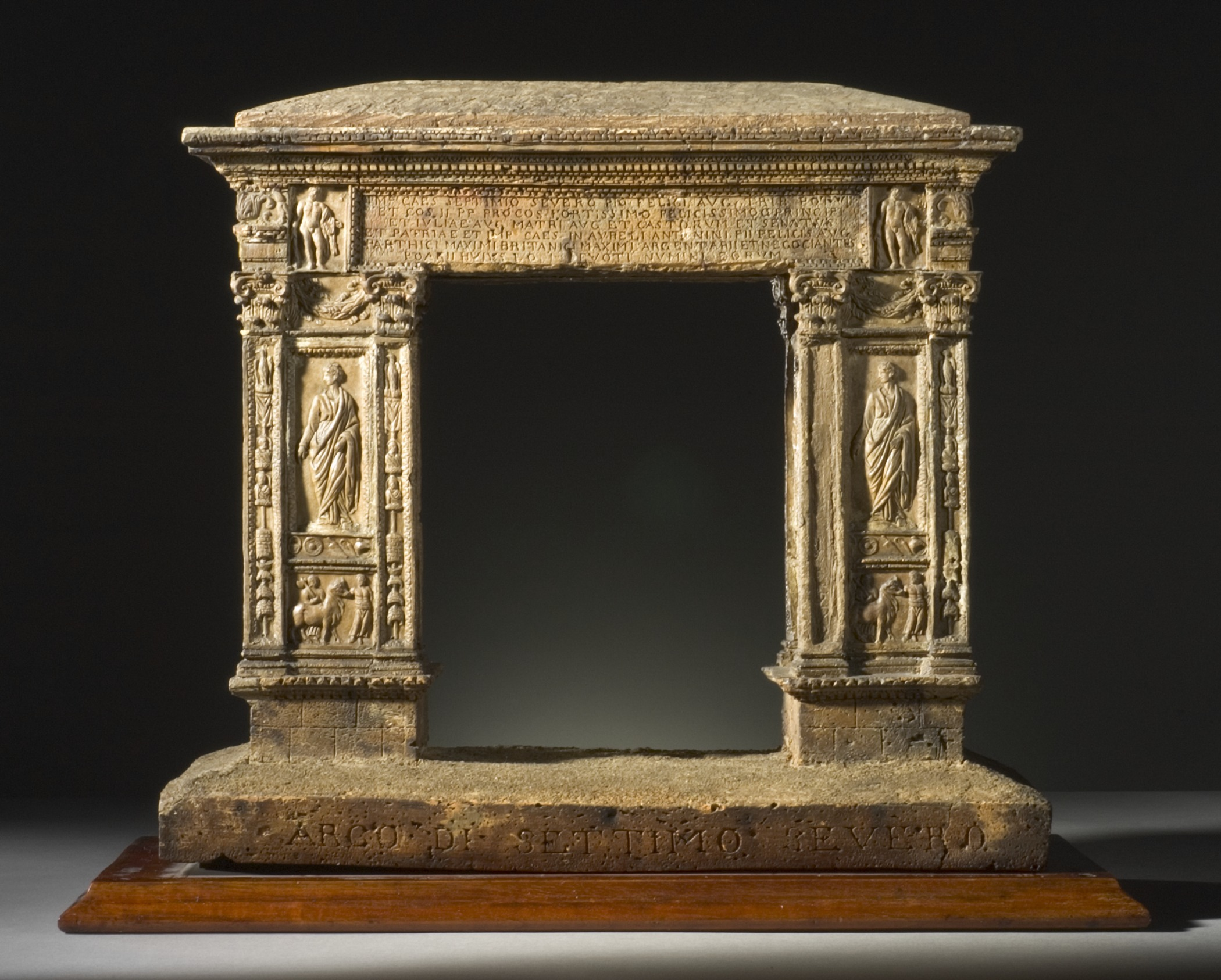
Model by Carl May, c. 1792-1795, Los Angeles County Museum of Art

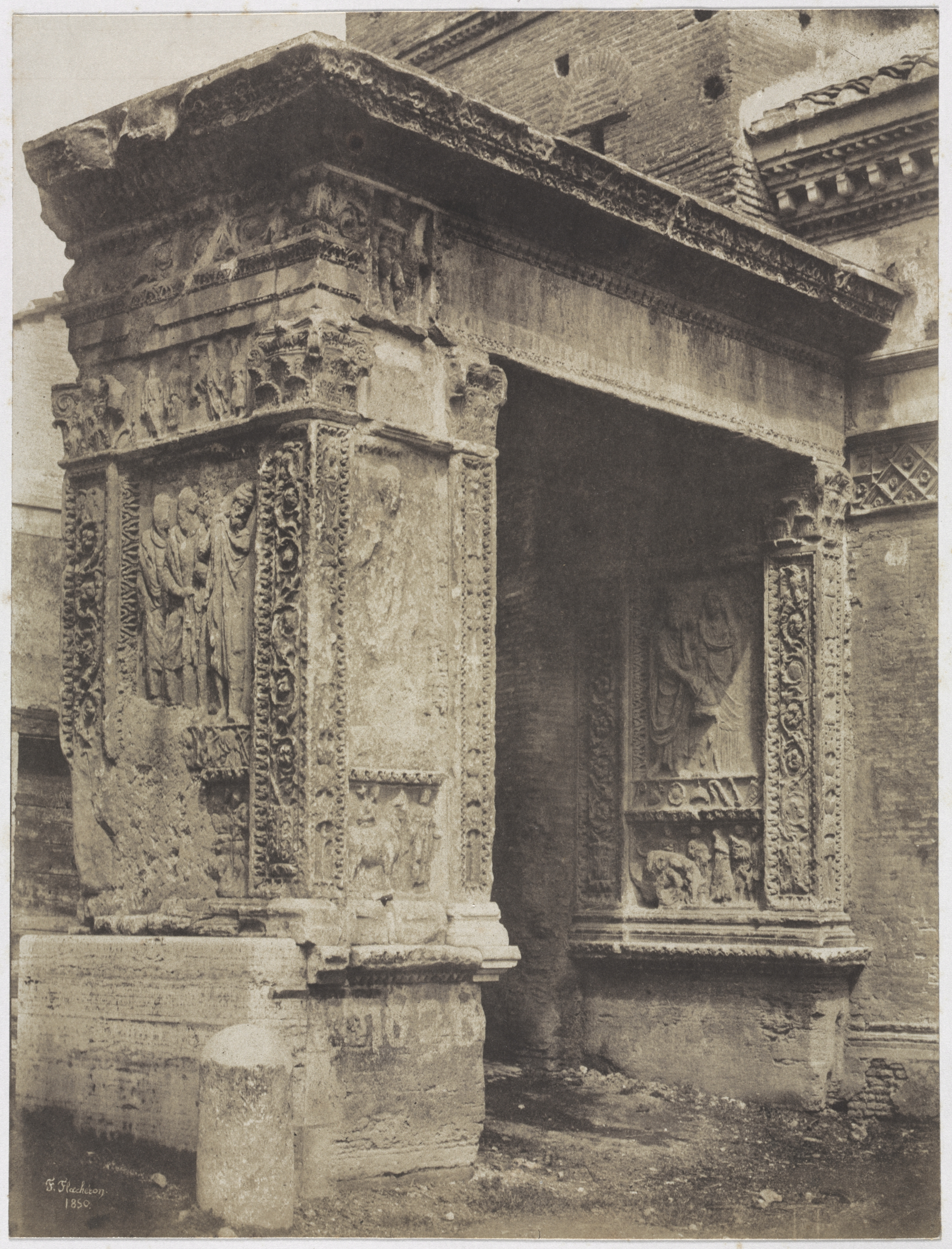
Photograph from 1850, before modern-day barriers

== See also ==
- List of Roman triumphal arches
- List of ancient sites in Rome
