= Temple of Hercules Victor =

Ancient religious monument in Rome, Italy

- Aedes Herculis Victoris (Latin)
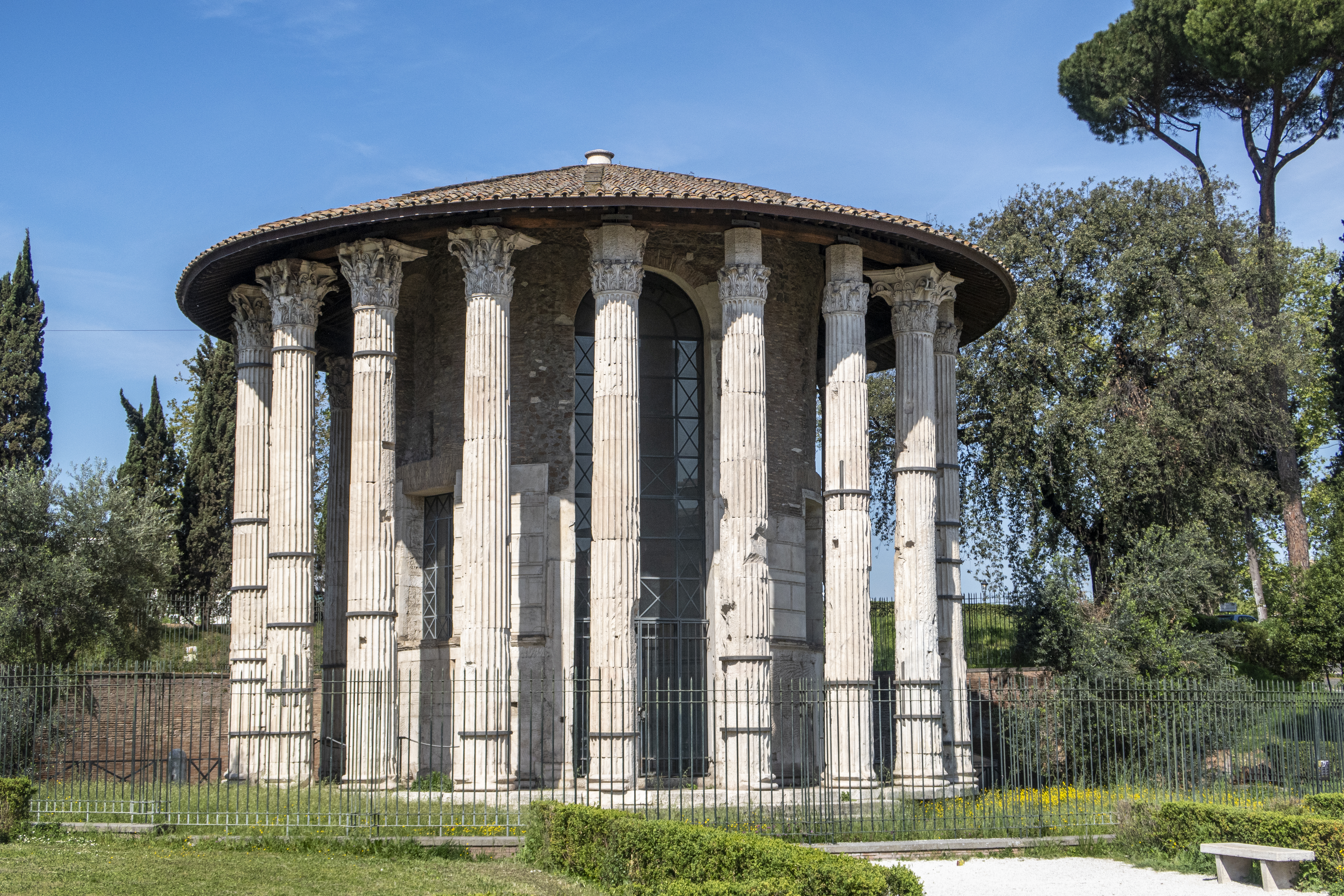
- The circular tholos structure of the Temple of Hercules Victor

- Shown within Republican/Augustan Rome
- Interactive map of Temple of Hercules Victor
- 41°53′19″N 12°28′51″E
- Location: Rome, Italy

History
- Built: c. 120–100 BCE
- Built by: Marcus Octavius Herennius

Site notes
- Area: Forum Boarium
- Architect: Hermodorus of Salamis

The Temple of Hercules Victor (Italian: Tempio di Ercole Vincitore) or Hercules Olivarius (Latin for "Hercules the Olive-Bearer") is a Roman temple in Piazza Bocca della Verità, the former Forum Boarium, in Rome, Italy. It is a tholos, a round temple of Greek 'peripteral' design completely surrounded by a colonnade. This layout caused it to be mistaken for a temple of Vesta until it was correctly identified by Napoleon's Prefect of Rome, Camille de Tournon.

Despite (or perhaps due to) the Forum Boarium's role as the cattle market for ancient Rome, the Temple of Hercules is the subject of a folk belief claiming that neither flies nor dogs will enter the holy place. The temple is the earliest surviving mostly intact marble building in Rome and the only surviving one made of Greek marble.

== Description ==
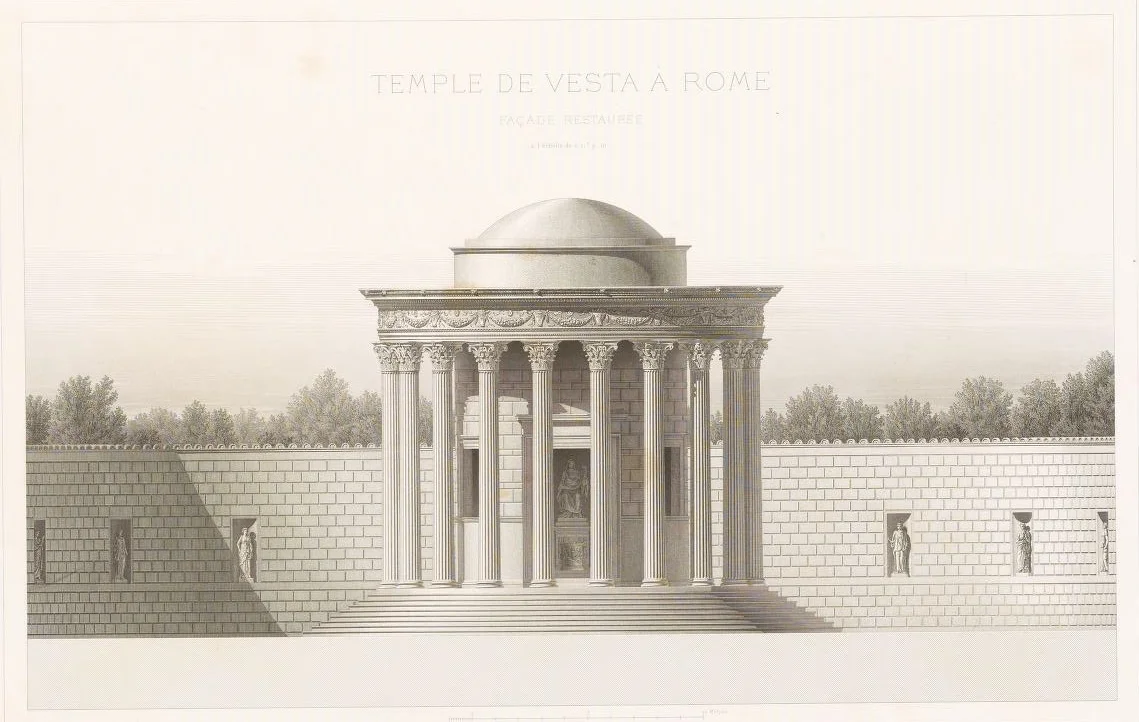
Jean Antoine Coussin, The Temple of Vesta or Hercules Victor, 1802 (reconstruction)

It is dated to the later 2nd century BC and was built either by L. Mummius Achaicus, conqueror of the Achaeans and destroyer of Corinth, or by the trader Marcus Octavius Herrenus in gratitude for success in business. The temple is 14.8 m in diameter and consists of a circular cella within a concentric ring of twenty Corinthian columns 10.66 m tall, resting on a tuff foundation. These elements supported an architrave and roof, which have disappeared.

The original wall of the cella, built of travertine and marble blocks, and nineteen of the originally twenty columns remain but the current tile roof was added later. Palladio's published reconstruction suggested a dome, though this was apparently erroneous. The temple's original dedication is dated back to circa 143-132 BC, a time when intense construction was taking place in Portus Tiberinus.

== Identification ==
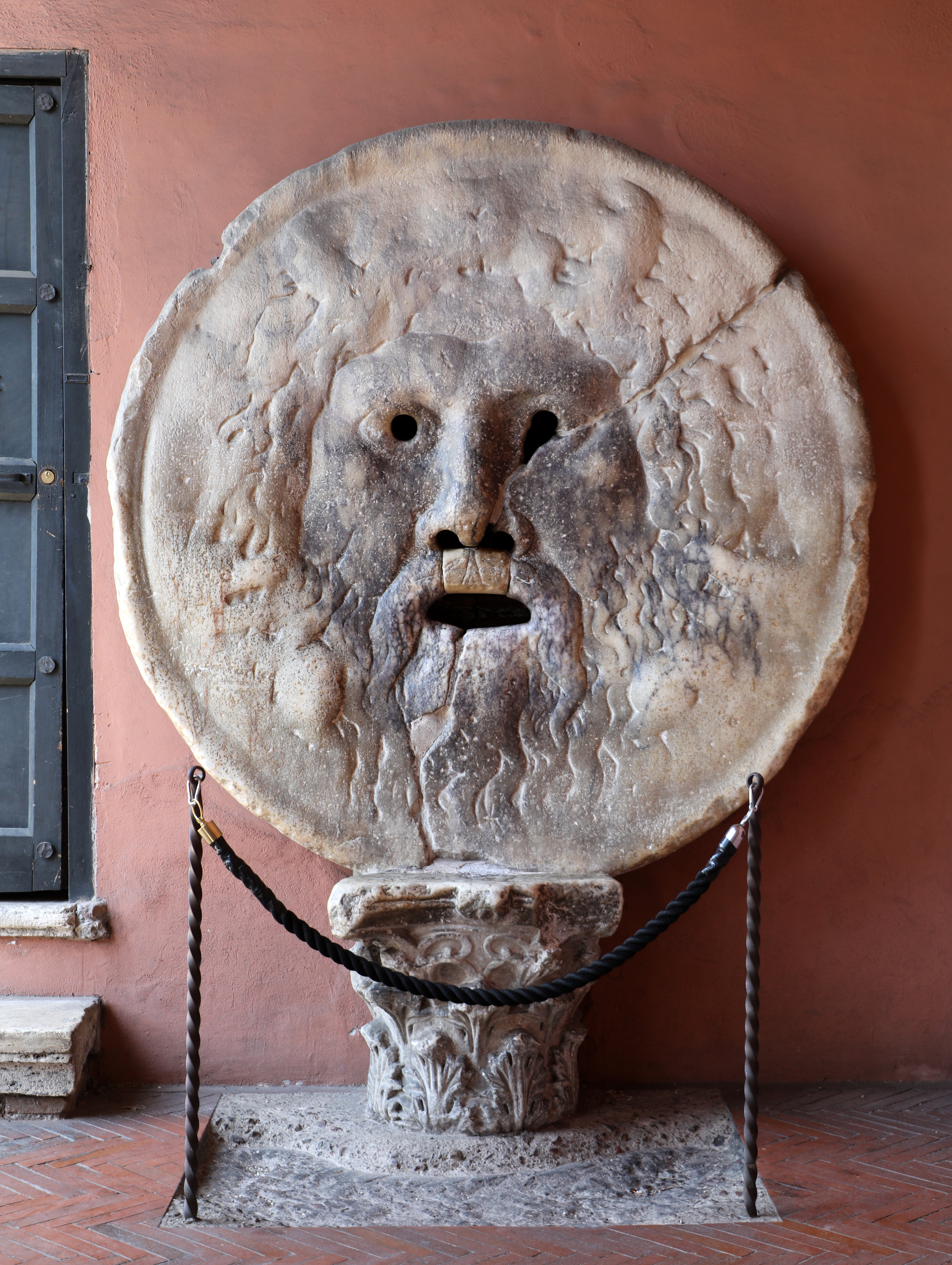
The Mouth of Truth, believed to have originated in the temple and been moved later to the nearby Basilica of Santa Maria in Cosmedin

Its major literary sources are two almost identical passages, one in Servius' commentary on the Aeneid (viii.363) and the other in Macrobius' Saturnalia. Though Servius mentions that aedes duae sunt, "there are two sacred temples", the earliest Roman calendars mention but one festival, on 13 August, to Hercules Victor and Hercules Invictus interchangeably.

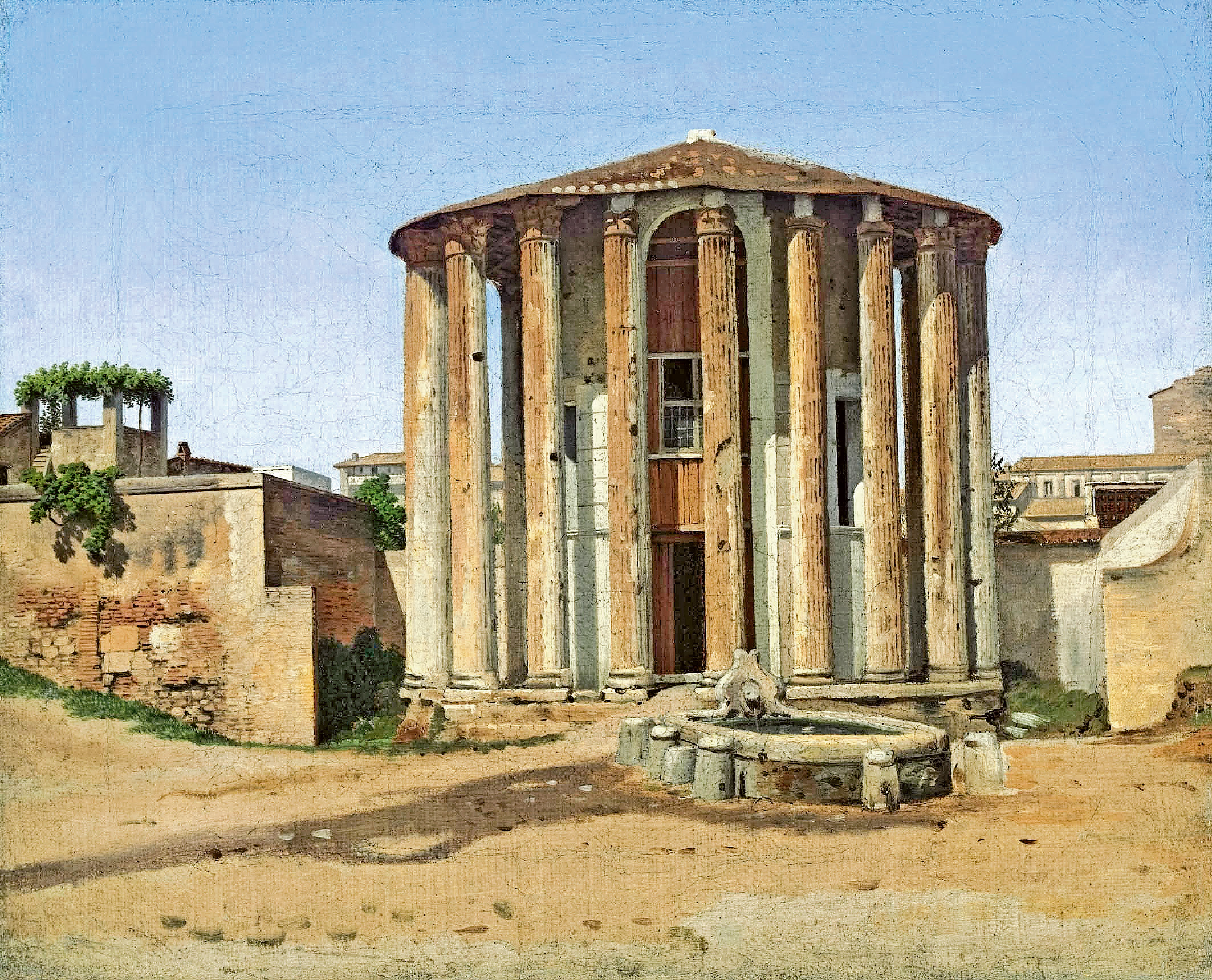
C.W. Eckersberg, Vesta Temple in Rome, 1814–1816, Nivaagaards Malerisamling

Temple of Hercules Victor, Rome. Photo by Underwood & Underwood, c. 1903. Department of Image Collections, National Gallery of Art Library.

== Post-Classical history ==
Map of the temple

In the 1st century AD, the temple was hit with some sort of disaster as 10 columns were replaced with Luna marble, which is similar to the original but not an exact replica. By 1132, the temple had been converted to a church, known as Santo Stefano alle Carozze (St. Stephen 'of the carriages'). In 1140, Innocent II converted the temple into a Christian church dedicating it to Santo Stefano.

Additional restorations (and a fresco over the altar) were made in 1475. A plaque in the floor was dedicated by Sixtus IV. In the 12th century, the cella wall was replaced with brick faced concrete and windows were added as well.

In the 17th century, the church was rededicated to Santa Maria del Sole ("St. Mary of the Sun"). The temple and the Temple of Vesta in Tivoli were an inspiration for Bramante's Tempietto and other High Renaissance churches of centralized plan. Between 1809 and 1810, the surrounding ground level was lowered and the temple was restored once again. The temple was recognized officially as an ancient monument in 1935 and restored in 1996.

== See also ==
- Hercules in Roman religion
- Temple of Hercules Musarum and the Ara Maxima
- Temple of Portunus
- List of Ancient Roman temples

Preceded by Temple of Hadrian	Landmarks of Rome; Temple of Hercules Victor	Succeeded by Temple of Janus
