= Forum Boarium =

Ancient Roman forum and cattle market in Rome

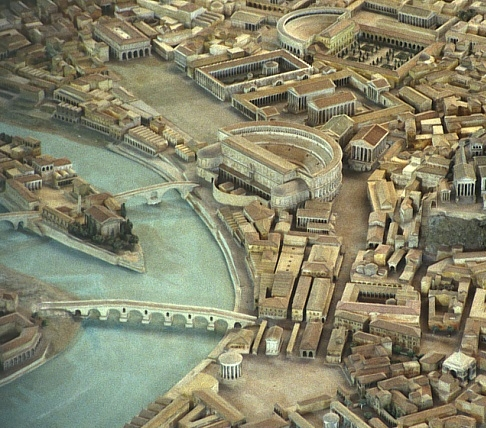
- The Forum Boarium and Temple of Hercules Victor in Gismondi's scale model of imperial Rome, Museum of Roman Civilization

- Shown within Augustan Rome
- Interactive map of Forum Boarium
- 41°53′20″N 12°28′52″E

The Forum Boarium (Classical Latin: [ˈfɔrʊm‿boˈaːriʊ̃], Italian: Foro Boario) was the cattle market or forum venalium of ancient Rome. It was located on a level piece of land near the Tiber between the Capitoline, the Palatine and Aventine hills. As the site of the original docks of Rome (Portus Tiberinus) and adjacent to the Pons Aemilius, the earliest stone bridge across the Tiber, the Forum Boarium experienced intense commercial activity.

== History ==
The site was a religious centre housing the Temple of Hercules Victor, the Temple of Portunus (Temple of Fortuna Virilis), and the massive 6th or 5th century BC Ara Maxima. According to legend, when Hercules arrived in this area with Geryon’s oxen, he was robbed of these by the giant Cacus, who lived in a cave at the foot of the Aventine hill. After slaying the giant, Hercules was honoured as a god by the ancient dwellers of the Palatine hill, who are said to have dedicated an altar to him. The tufa stone core of this altar is housed inside the church of Santa Maria in Cosmedin.

The Forum Boarium was the site of the first gladiatorial contest at Rome which took place in 264 BC as part of aristocratic funerary ritual—a munus or funeral gift for the dead. Marcus and Decimus Junius Brutus Scaeva put on a gladiatorial combat in honor of their deceased father with three pairs of gladiators.

In 215 BC, four victims were buried alive by the Romans under the Forum Boarium as human sacrifices to placate the gods after a series of events were seen as portents to great disaster. In volume five of Livy's History of Rome, which was written about 200 years later, the Roman historian wrote:

A Gaulish man and a Gaulish woman and a Greek man and a Greek woman were buried alive under the Forum Boarium. They were lowered into a stone vault, which had on a previous occasion also been polluted by human victims, a practice most repulsive to Roman feelings. When the gods were believed to be duly propitiated, Marcus Claudius Marcellus sent from Ostia 1500 men who had been enrolled for service with the fleet to garrison Rome.

== Architecture ==
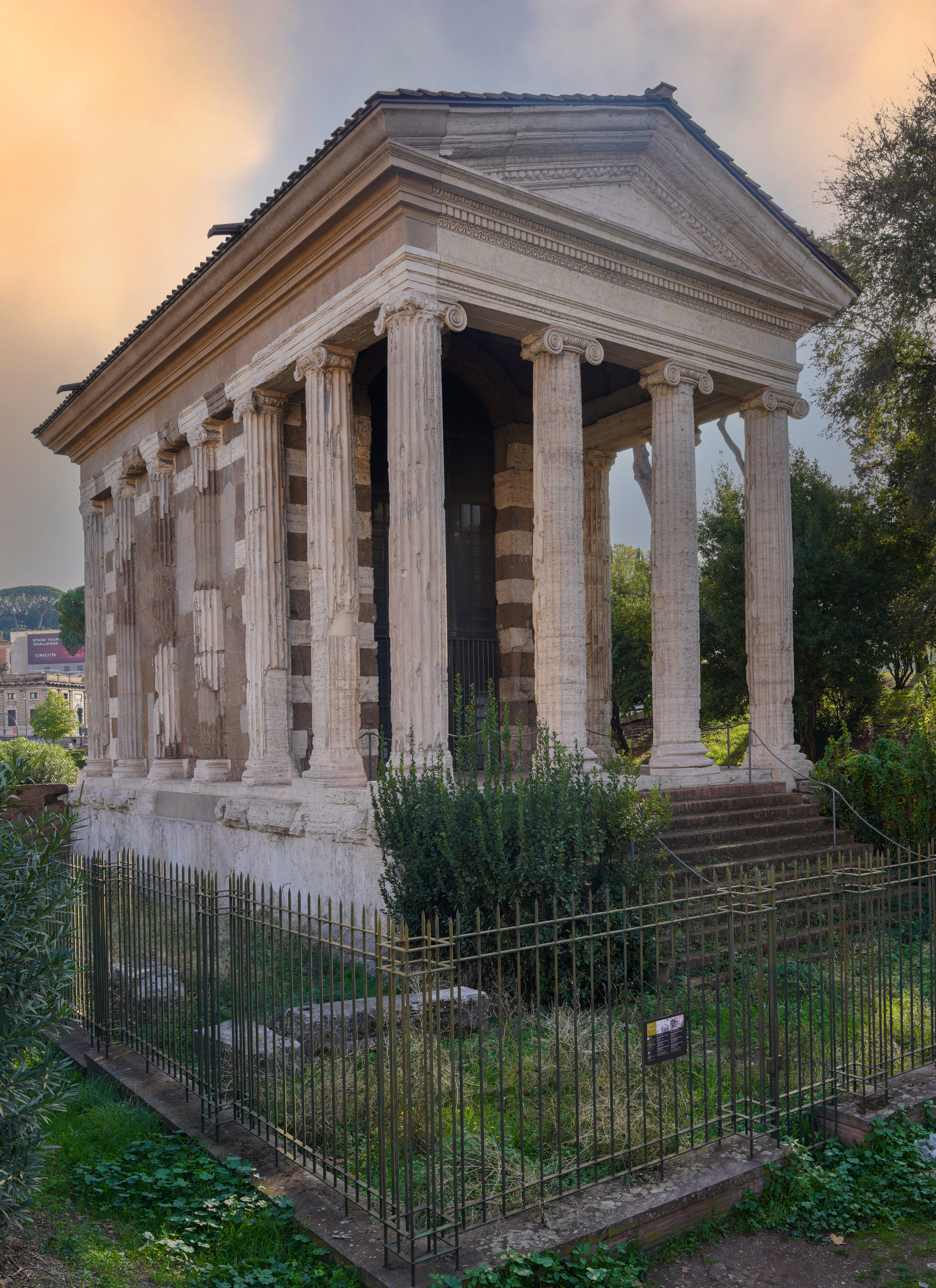
The Temple of Portunus after conservation work

The Temple of Hercules Victor ("Hercules the Winner") or Hercules Olivarius ("Hercules the Olive-Bearer) is a circular peristyle building dating from the 2nd century BC. It consists of a colonnade of Corinthian columns arranged in a concentric ring around the cylindrical cella, resting on a tuff foundation. These elements originally supported an architrave and roof which have disappeared. It is the earliest surviving marble building in Rome. For centuries, this was known as the Temple of Vesta.

The Temple of Portunus is a rectangular building built between 100 and 80 BC. It consists of a tetrastyle portico and cella mounted on a podium reached by a flight of steps. The four Ionic columns of the portico are free-standing, while the six columns on the long sides and four columns at the rear are engaged along the walls of the cella. It is built of tuff and travertine with a stucco surface. This temple was for centuries known as the Temple of Fortuna Virilis.

Sources claim the Forum was the site for placement of a statue by the sculptor Myron, which had been looted from Aegina. While the source mentions a cow, it may have been a statuary group of Theseus defeating the Minotaur, which was apt for a cattle market.

During the late period of the Western Roman Empire, the area became overtaken with shops. Both temples were deconsecrated and converted to Christian churches. Across the street is the church of Santa Maria in Cosmedin, housing the Bocca della Verità.

== Restoration ==
The Temple of Hercules Victor with the temple of Portunus on the right in a mid-18th century etching by Giuseppe Vasi

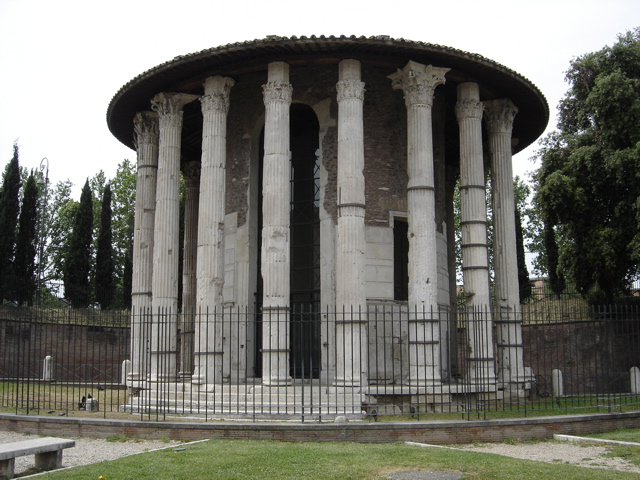
The Temple of Hercules Victor today

Beginning in the late 1990s, a partnership between the Soprintendenza speciale per i beni archeologici di Roma and World Monuments Fund resulted in the conservation of both temples in the Forum Boarium. The project also included new landscaping for the site. However, the Arch of Janus is still unrestored.

| Preceded by Trajan's Forum | Landmarks of Rome; Forum Boarium | Succeeded by Forum Holitorium |
