= Arch of Septimius Severus (disambiguation) =

The Arch of Septimius Severus may refer to:

- Arch of Septimius Severus in Rome, Italy
- Arch of Septimius Severus (Leptis Magna) in Leptis Magna, Italy
- Arch of Septimius Severus (Thugga) in Thugga, Tunisia
- Monumental Arch of Palmyra in Palmyra, Syria.
