= Tetrapylon =

Structure with two crossing arched passages

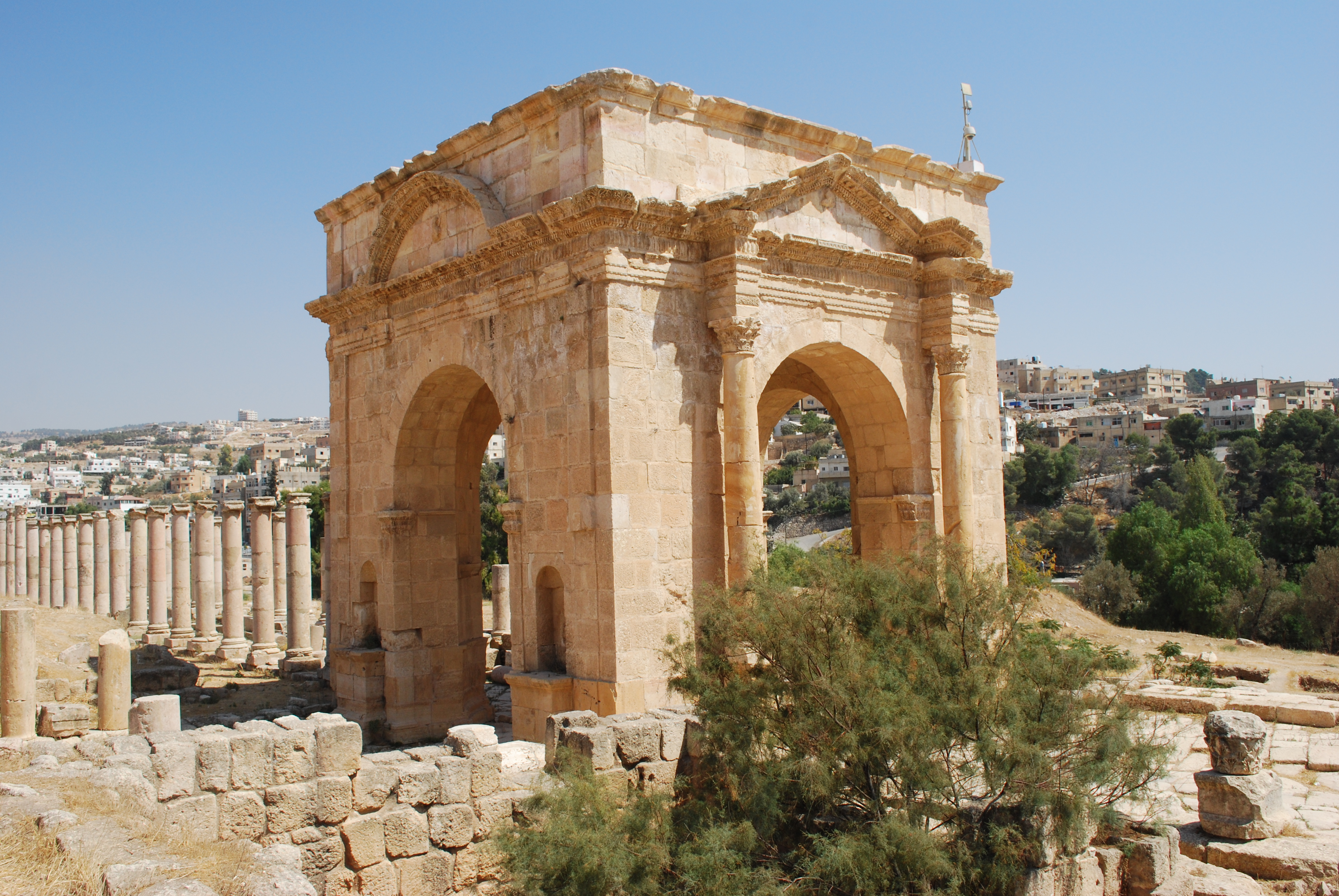
The North Tetrapylon at Jerash in Jordan

A tetrapylon (plural tetrapyla; Greek: τετράπυλον, lit. 'four gates'; Latin: quadrifrons, lit. 'four fronts', also used in English) is a rectangular form of monument with arched passages in two directions, at right angles, generally built on a crossroads. They appear in ancient Roman architecture, usually as a form of the Roman triumphal arch at significant crossroads or geographical "focal points".

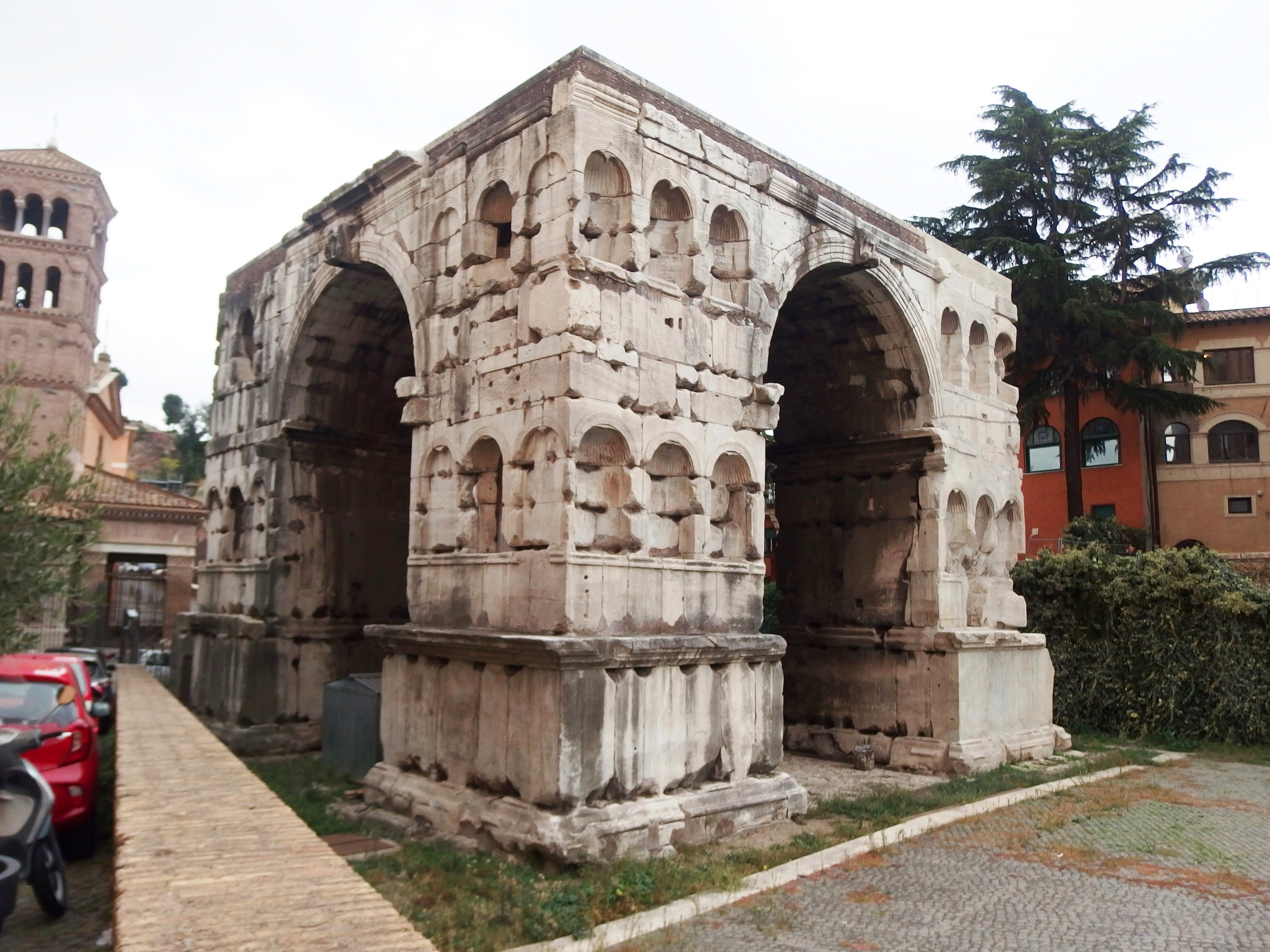
The so-called "Arch of Janus" in Rome, 4th-century

A tetrapylon was effectively a 'doubling' of the original triumphal arch form; with a total of four major arched openings, one on each side of the structure (one pair of openings opposite each other along one axis, and a second pair of openings of equal or lesser prominence perpendicular to the first pair; hence a structure with two barrel vaulted passageways, in the form of a cross). Roman examples are usually roughly square in plan, with the crossing archways of the same size; in some later examples, the plan is oblong, with the longer sides having a larger archway as for example at the Arc de Triomphe in Paris.

The three-arched form is called an octopylon as it has eight piers. As it still has four faces it can still be called a quadrifrons. The tetrakionion is another variant, with four groups of columns, usually four in each, that were never connected by stone.

Called chahartaq, similar structures were built in Sasanian architecture and perhaps earlier as well as later periods in the architecture of Iran, some apparently as parts of the fire temples of Zoroastrianism. These normally had small domes above, which Roman examples did not. Since many Roman tetrapylons are in Eastern parts of the empire once ruled by the Persians, influence has been proposed, although Roman examples follow the style of Greco-Roman classical architecture.

== Description ==
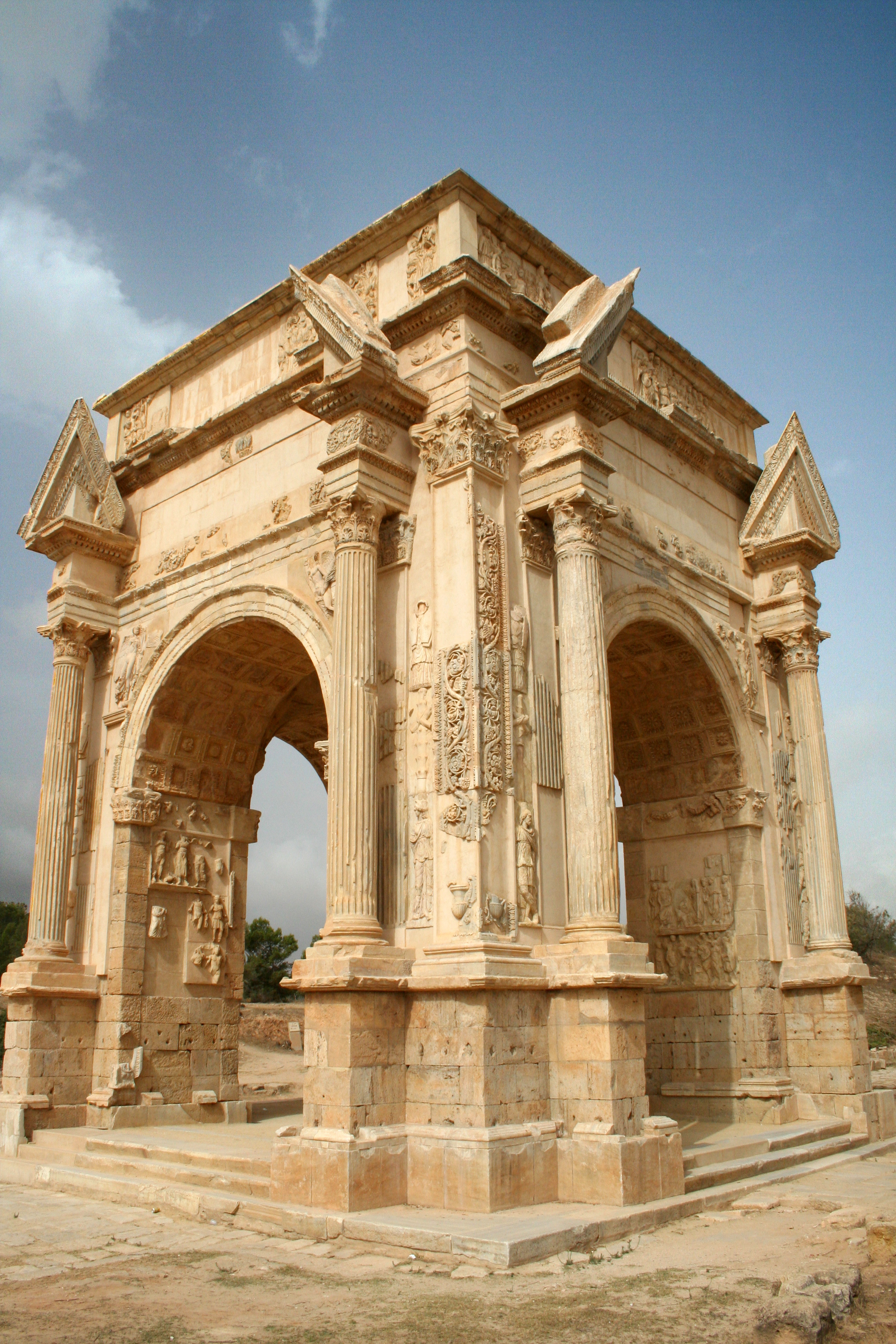
Arch of Septimius Severus (Leptis Magna), Libya

The tetrapylon was a relatively rare type of monument in classical architecture. The defining quality of this form is the concept of four gates, with four pillars or other supporting structures placed at the corners marking the divisions between them. A tetrapylon could take the form of a single building or multiple, separate structures.

They were built as grandiose landmarks, rarely functioning as gateways, but as decorative and aesthetically pleasing ornamental architecture.

The normal Roman type is square, with the four faces usually very similar; these are found "from Spain to Syria", with a probable example in England. Post-classical examples, like the Arc de Triomphe du Carrousel in Paris and the Gateway of India in Mumbai, tend to be oblong, with three arches on the long face, the central of which is the main one, much larger than the side arches, or the single arches passing in the other direction. This was probably also the form of the Arch of Galerius, which crossed a main city road, with the other axis crossing, or marking, the entrance road for the imperial palace. This may have been extended from a tetrapylon to an octopylon.

Although at an important crossroad in the city, the Arch of Septimius Severus at Leptis Magna has three steps up from the road level, suggesting that it was not passed through by wheeled traffic.

The better known Parisian Arc de Triomphe has only one arch in each face, but is also oblong, with the arch on the long face much larger. None of these modern arches straddle a significant road.

== Tetrakionion ==
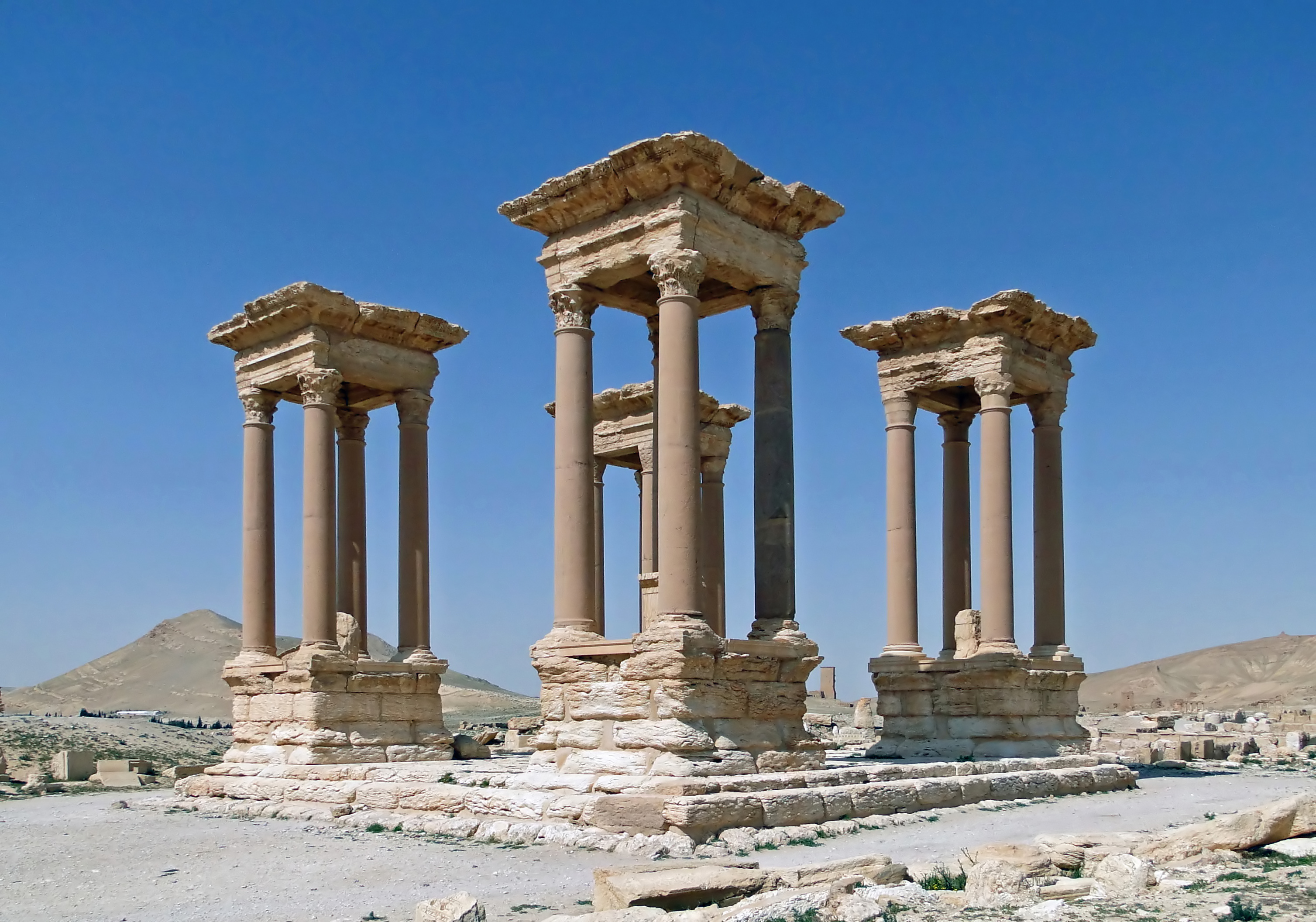
The tetrakionion or tetrapylon (pictured in 2010) at Palmyra in Syria marked the second pivot in the route of the colonnaded street. It consisted of a square platform bearing at each corner a tight grouping of four columns. Each of the four groups of pillars supported 150,000kg of solid cornice. It was badly vandalized in 2017 by Islamic State.

A tetrakionion (Koine Greek: τετρακιόνιον), plural tetrakionia, is a type of tetrapylon in which the central crossing is not roofed, and the four corner-markers exist as four separate structures, now unconnected, but perhaps originally supporting coverings in perishable materials such as wood and fabric. These are typically associated with turnings on colonnaded streets as part of a grand processional route.

Even after recent attempts at destruction when the city was occupied by the Islamic State, the example at Palmyra, Syria is the best preserved. The South Tetrapylon at Jerash seems to have had this form, as well as structures in Anjar, Lebanon, Ephesus, and other cities, all in the Eastern Roman Empire, apart from a tomb in Pompeii that is much smaller than the examples on streets. Some, perhaps all, seem to have had statues either on the tops of the columns, or perhaps in between them at the bottom, on the rather high plinths that large examples have.

The relatively small example at Aphrodisias, Turkey is rather different, with the two groups of columns on each side of the roadway joined by open pediments over arches, while none of the structure crosses the road itself. This thus represents a hybrid of the tetrapylon and tetrakionion.

== Notable ancient tetrapyla ==
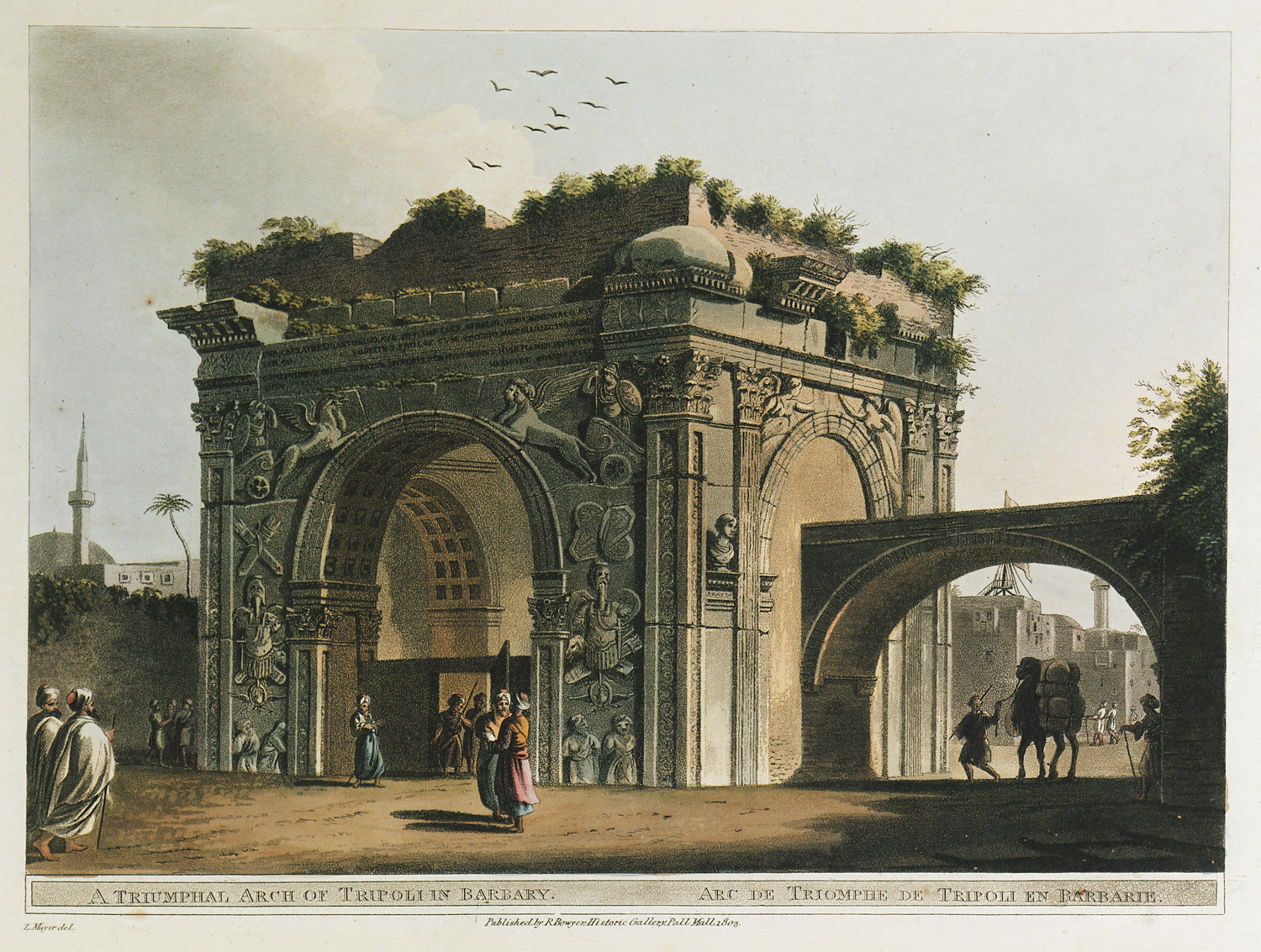
Arch of Marcus Aurelius in Tripoli, from Views in the Ottoman Empire, 1803, by Luigi Mayer

- the Arch of Galerius at Thessaloniki (Salonica) in Greece
- the Arch of Janus in Rome
- the Arch of Septimius Severus (Leptis Magna) in Libya
- Arch of Malborghetto, north of Rome on the Via Flaminia, the openings filled in in the Middle Ages, 4th-century
- at Cáparra in Spain
- the Arch of Marcus Aurelius at Oea in Tripoli in Libya
- at Palmyra in Syria
- a monumental gateway at Aphrodisias in Turkey is considered a tetrapylon of the tetrakionion type, c. 200.
- Milion, a mile marker in Ancient Constantinople
- the Arch of Caracalla (Thebeste) in Theveste
- in Anjar (in the Bekaa Valley) at the intersection of Cardo Maximus and Decumanus Maximus streets
- two in Jerash (Jordan): one at the intersection of northern-decumanus and cardo maximus and the other at the intersection of southern-Decumanus and cardo maximus.
- the demolished Roman arch at Richborough Castle (Rutupiae) in Kent in southern England; it is thought to have been demolished by the Romans themselves for building materials
- Heidentor at Carnuntum, Austria
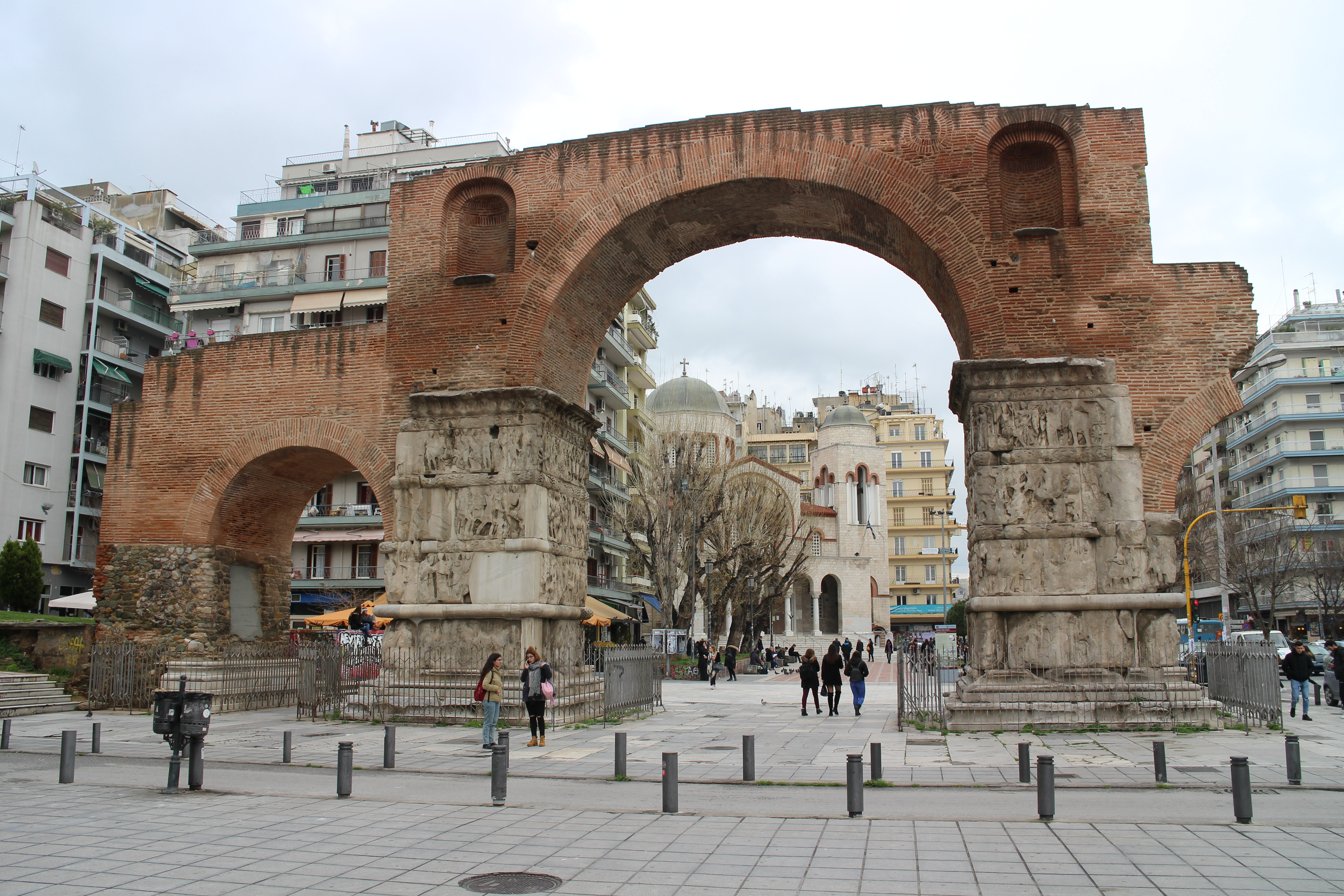
Remains of the Arch of Galerius, Thessaloniki, 299-303

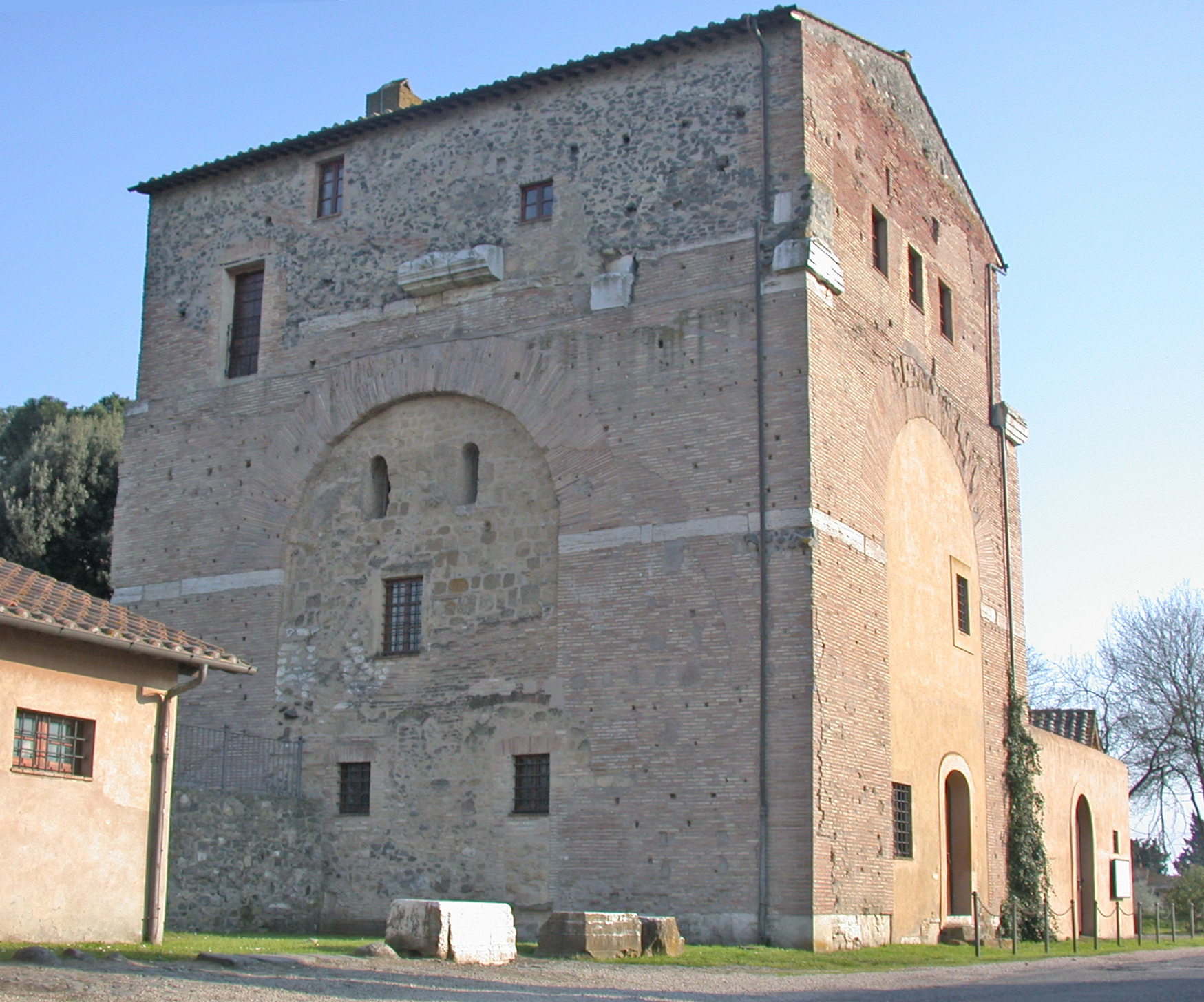
Arch of Malborghetto, near Rome on the Via Flaminia, 4th century

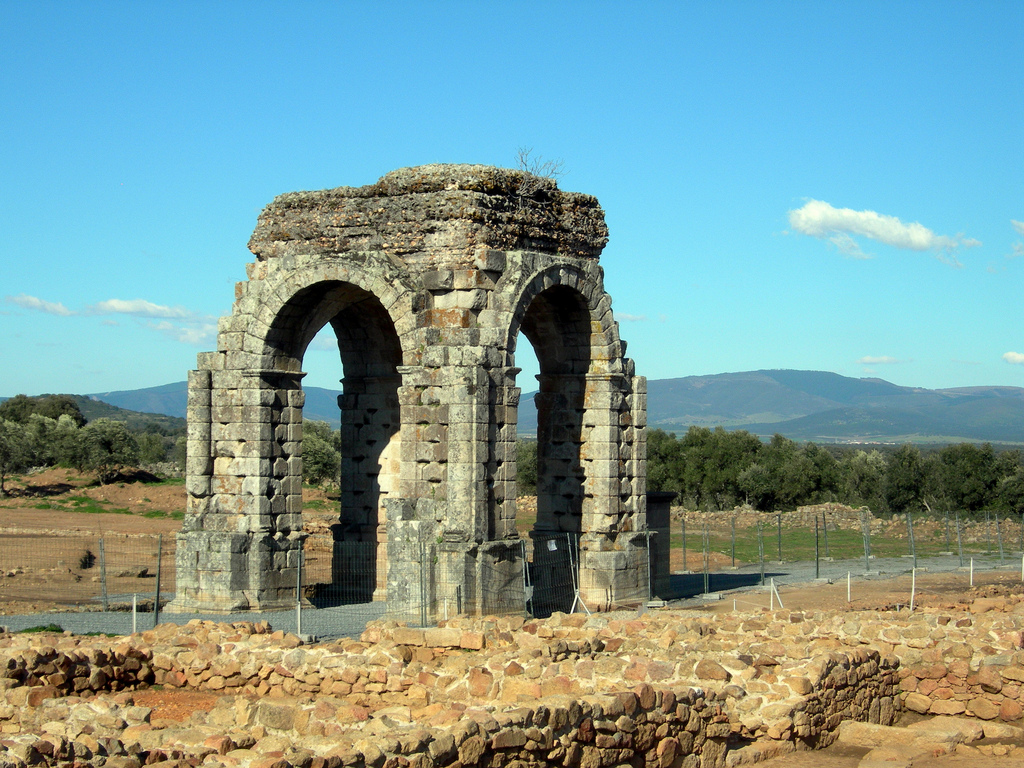
Cáparra, Spain

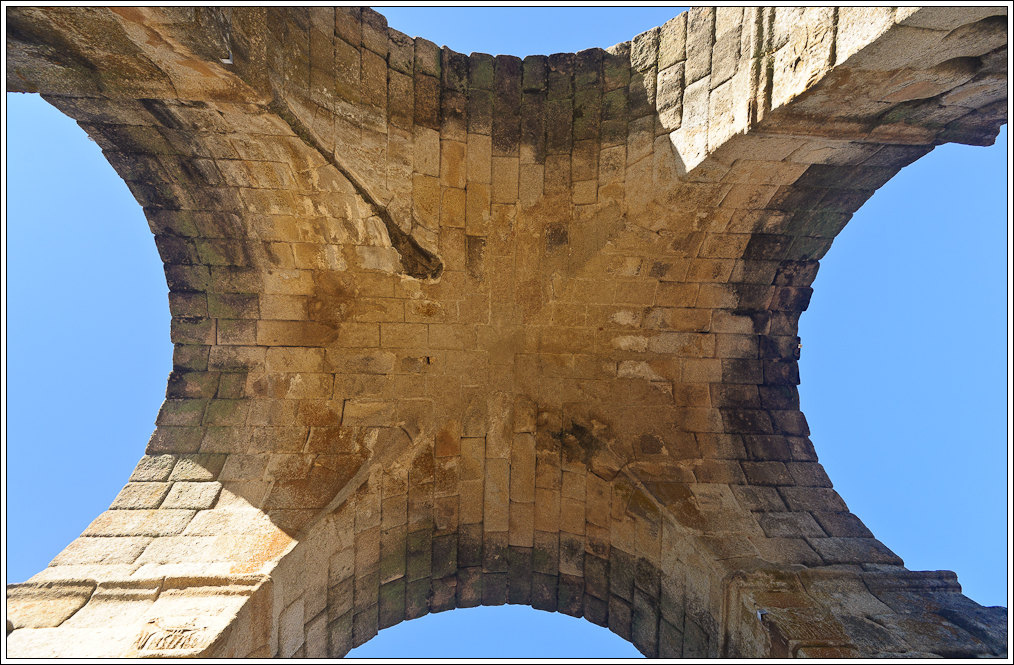
Inside Cáparra, looking up

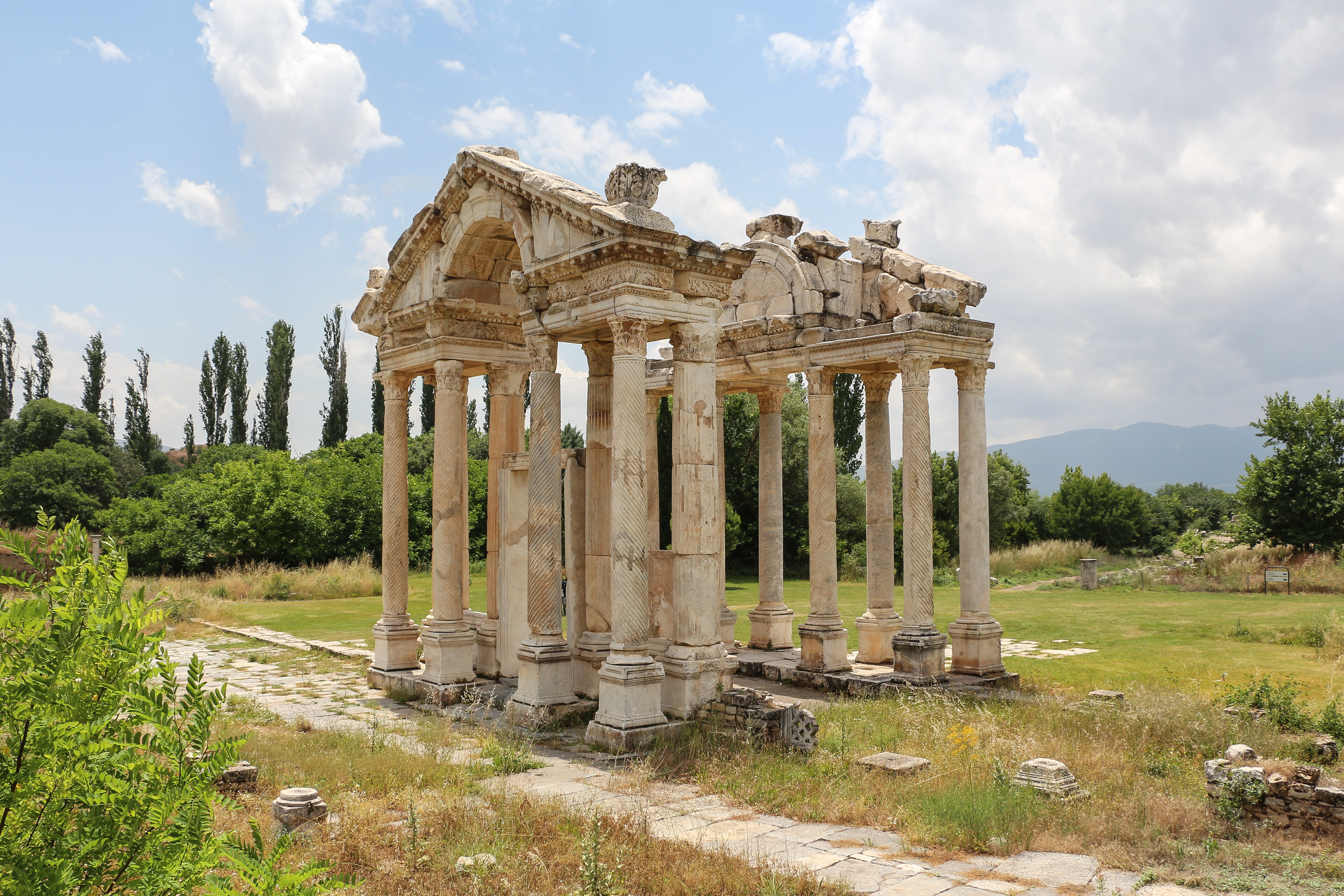
Tetrakionion at Aphrodisias, Turkey

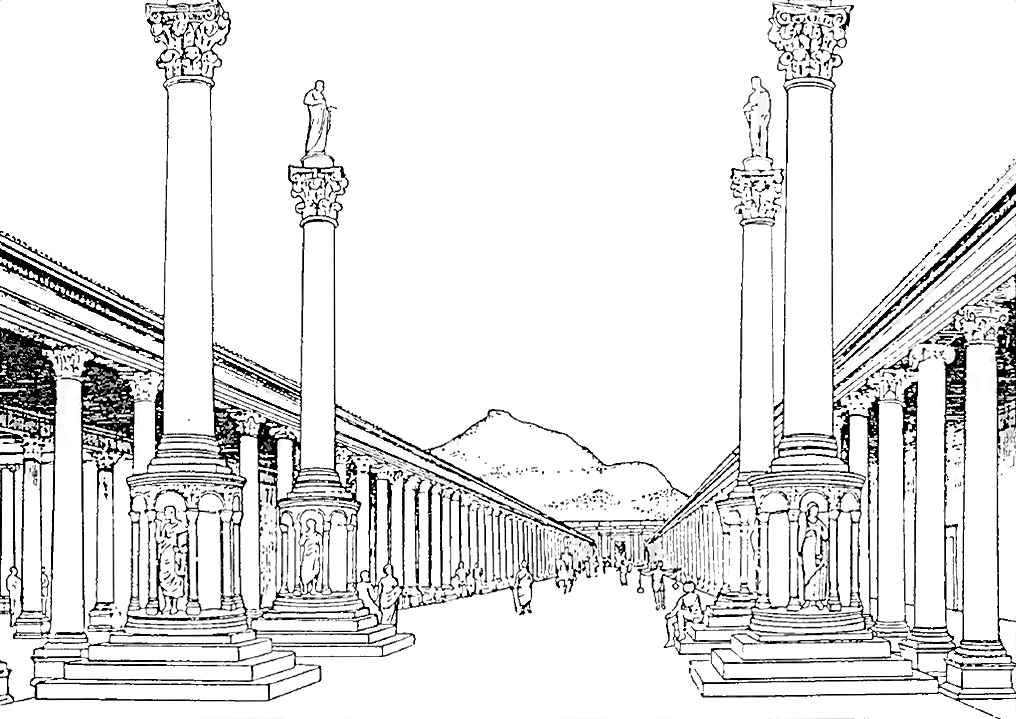
Speculative reconstruction of the tetrakionion in Ephesus

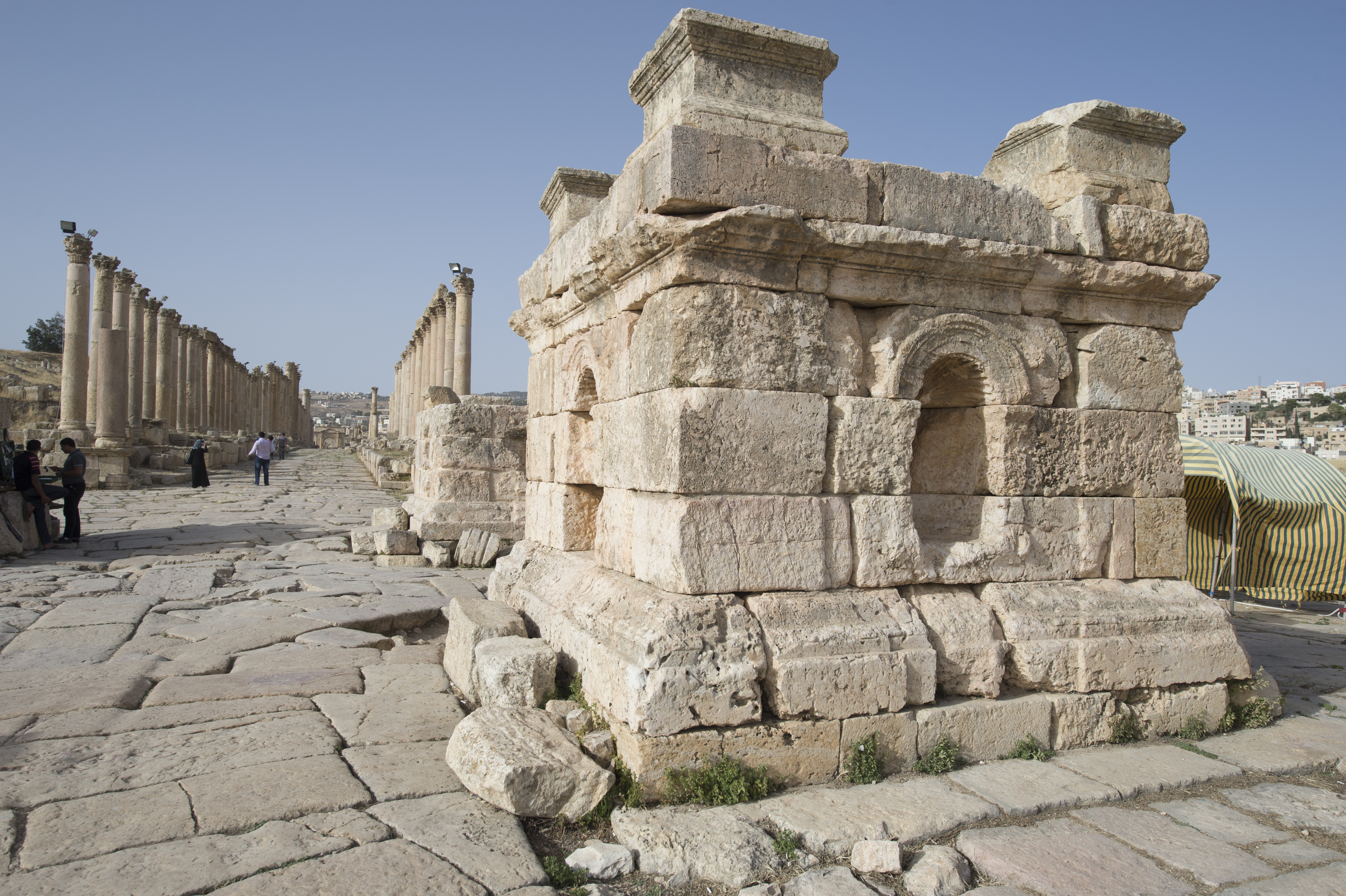
Two plinths of the South Tetrapylon at Jerash, presumed to be a tetrakionion, with a view down the colonnaded street

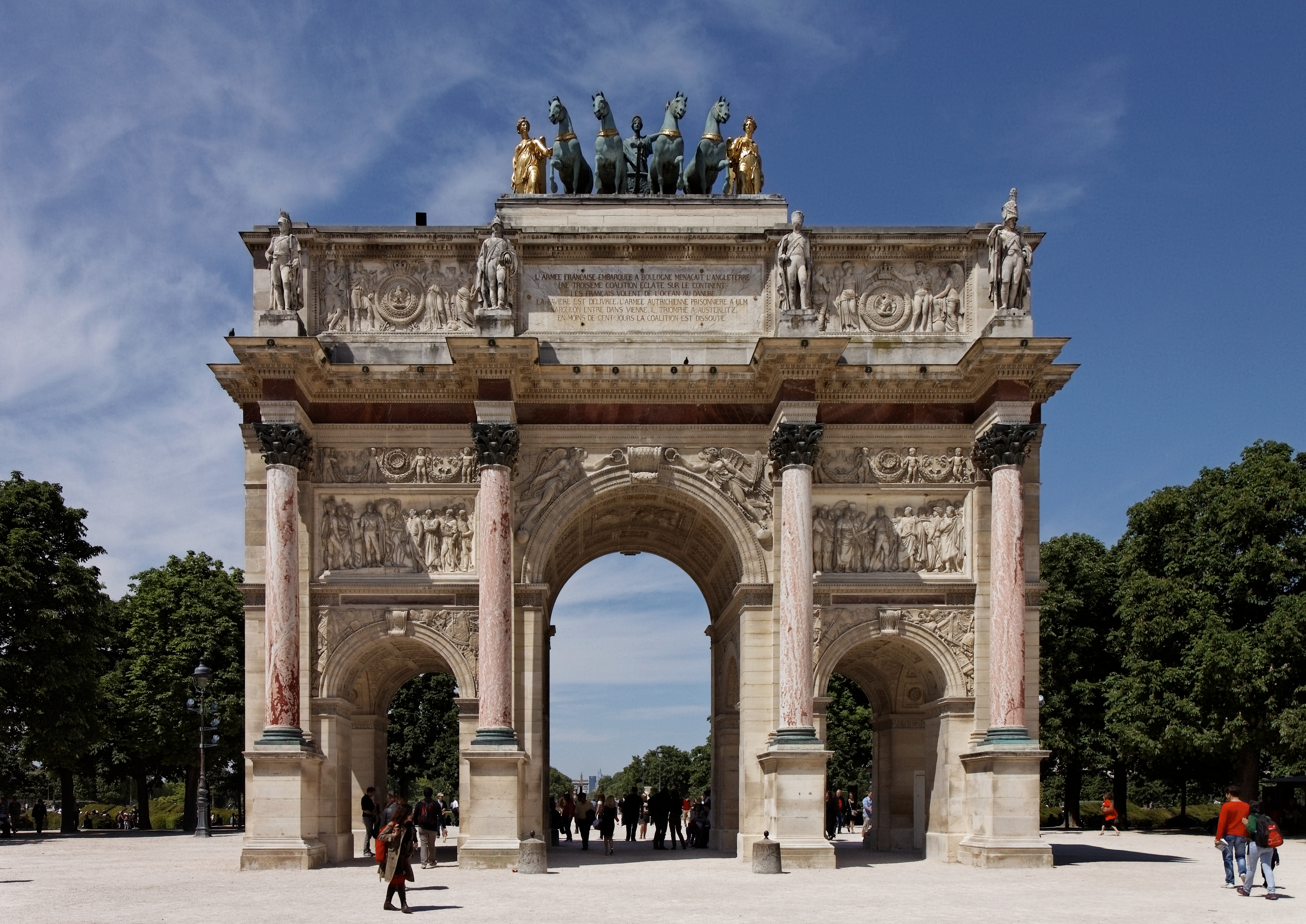
Long face of the octopylon Arc de Triomphe du Carrousel, Paris

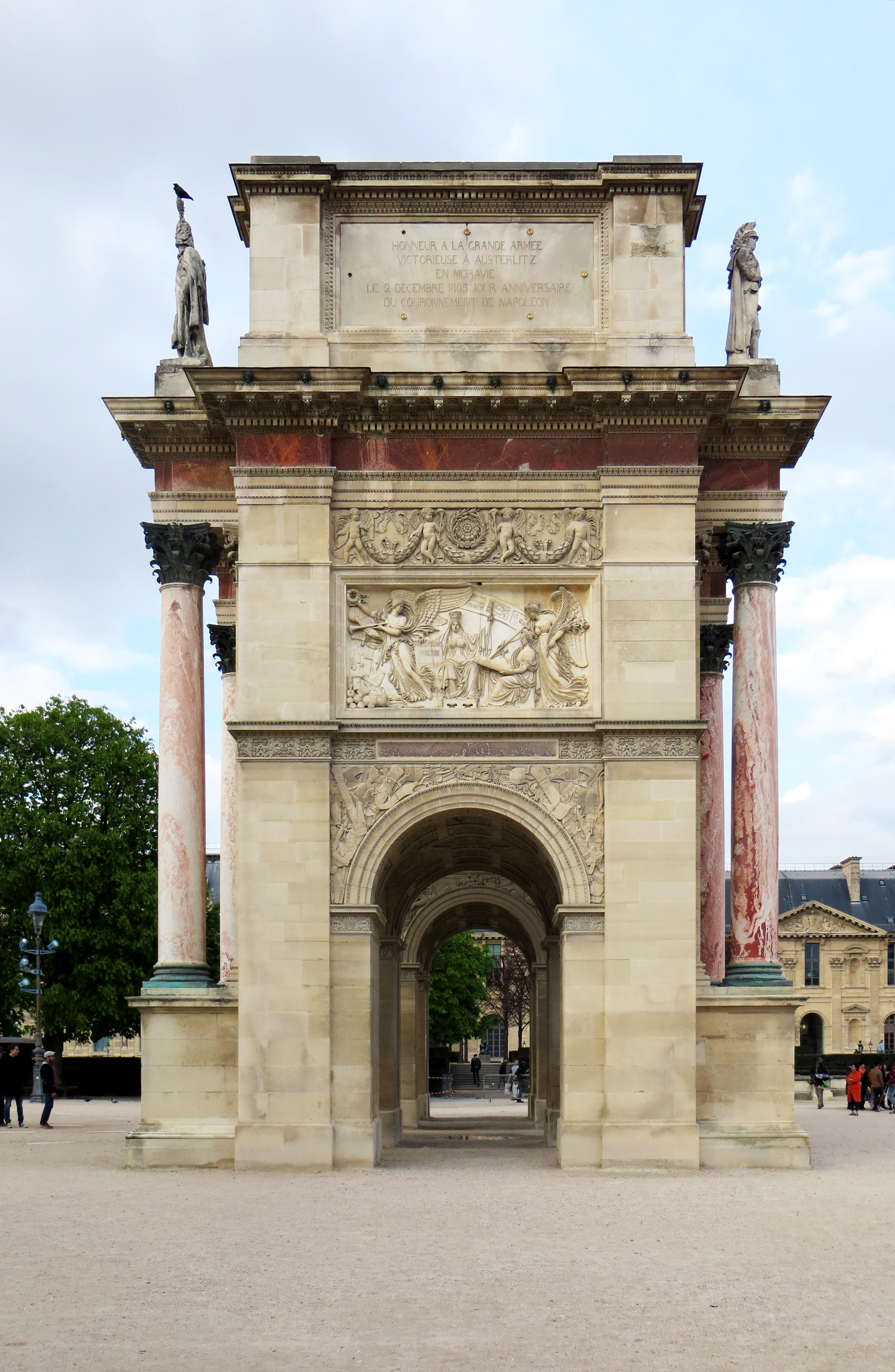
Side view of the Arc de Triomphe du Carrousel

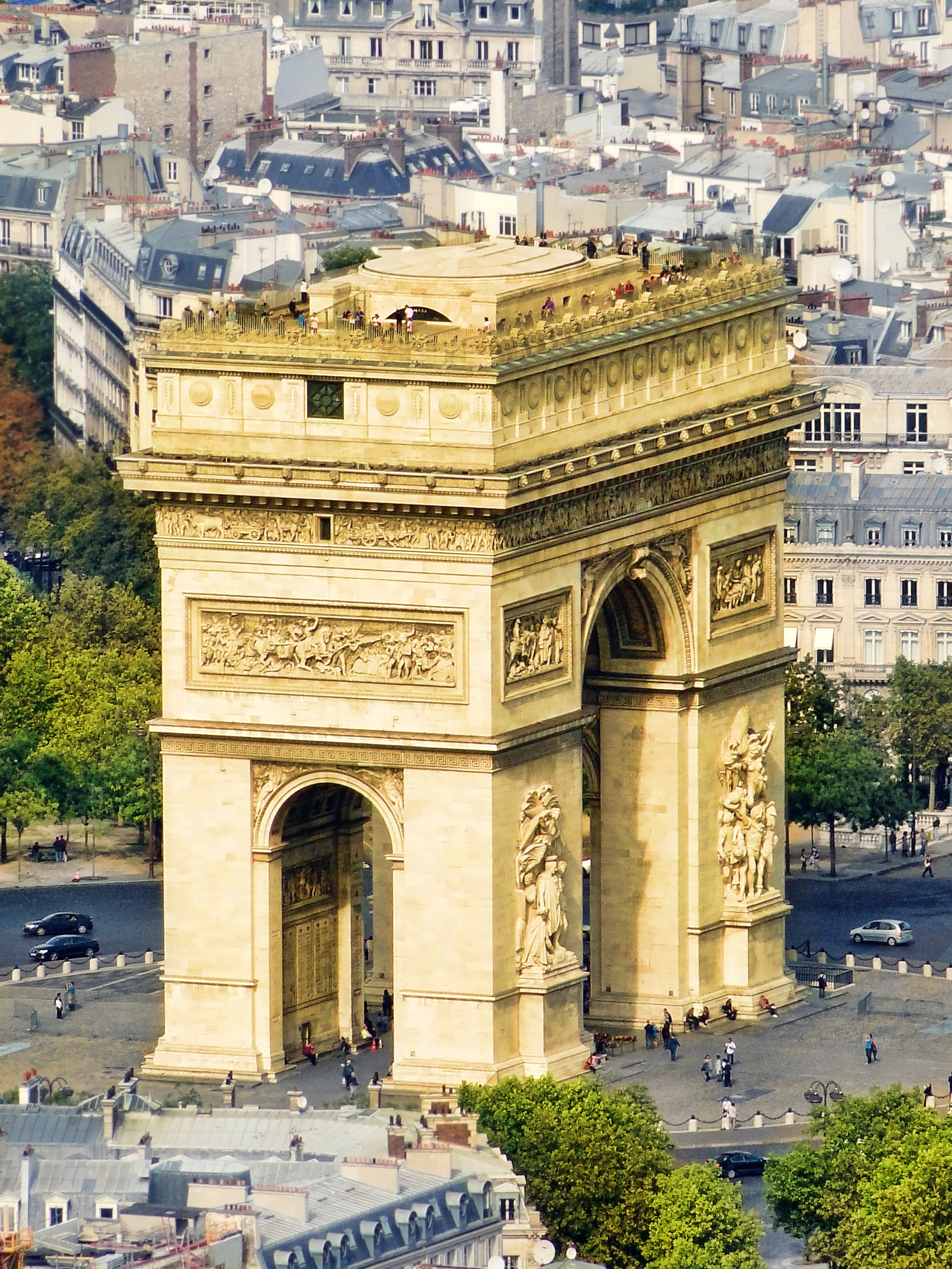
The Arc de Triomphe seen from the Eiffel Tower

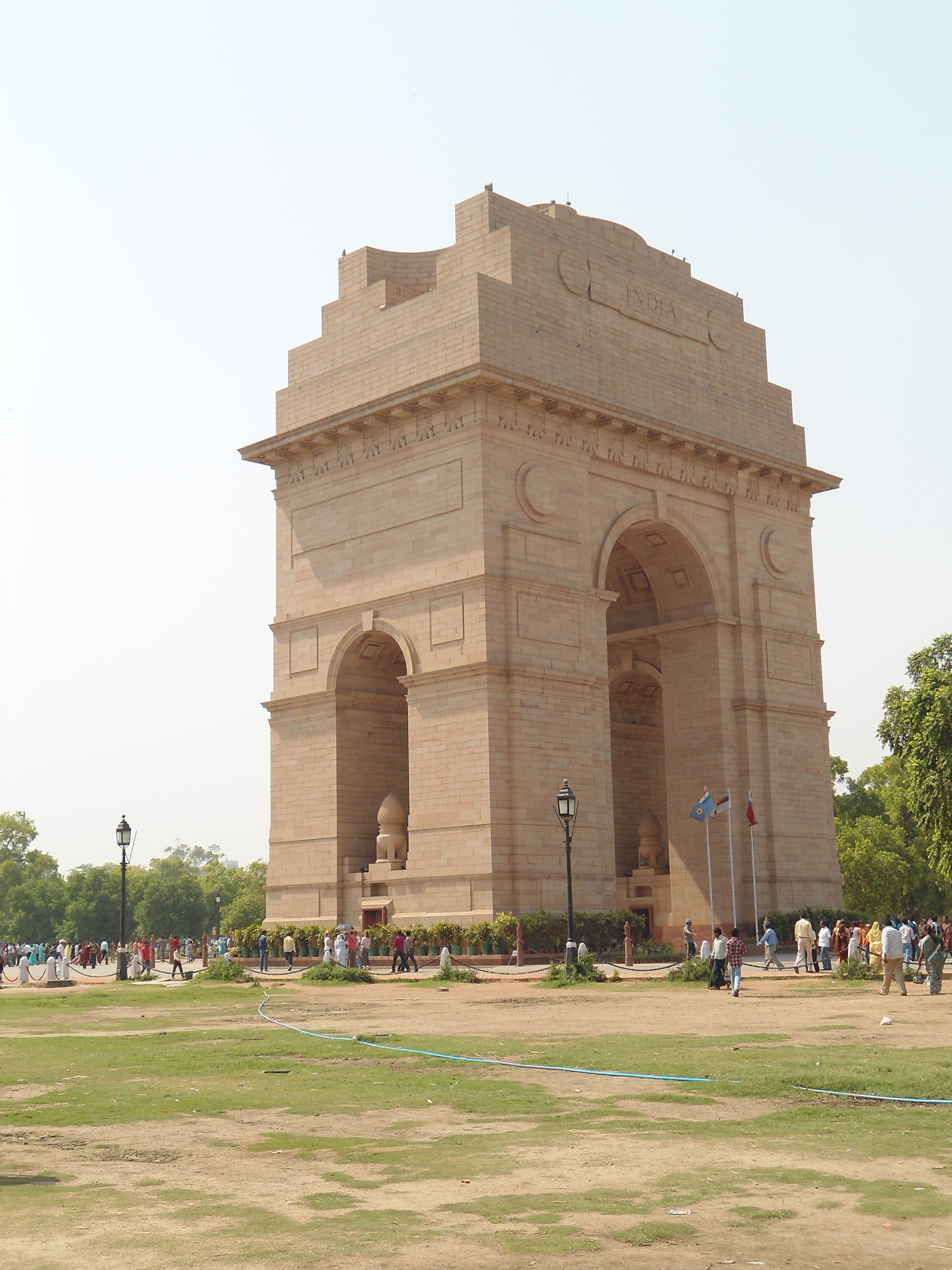
India Gate, a war memorial in New Delhi by Edwin Lutyens, 1930s
