= Arch of Janus =

Ancient Roman arch in Rome, Italy

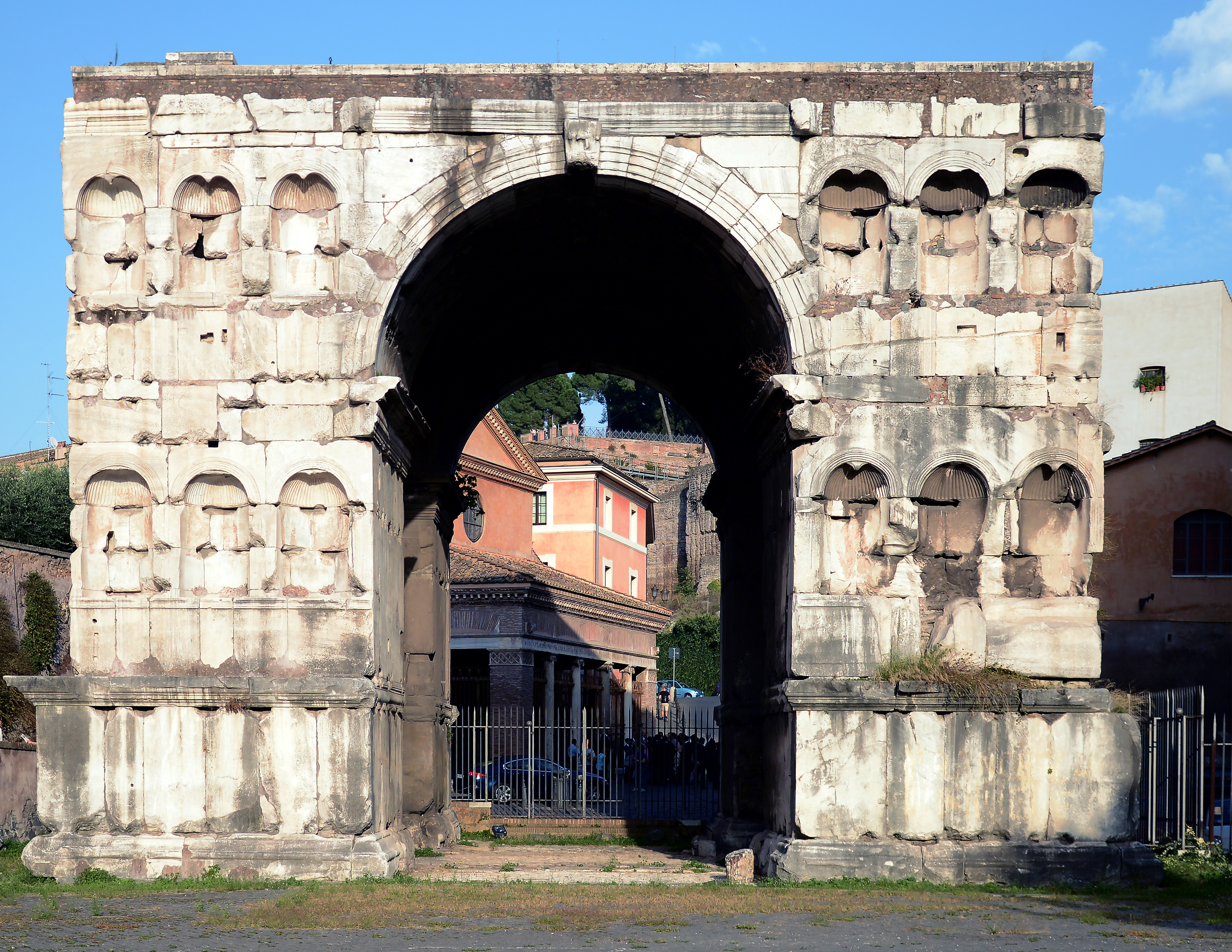
- The so-called Arch of Janus was not actually dedicated to that Roman god; it is the only surviving ancient quadrifrons triumphal arch in Rome

- Location within Rome
- Click on the map for a fullscreen view
- 41°53′22″N 12°28′58″E
- Location: Rome

The Arch of Janus is the only quadrifrons triumphal arch preserved in Rome. It was set up in the early 4th century AD at a crossroads at the northeastern limit of the Forum Boarium, close to the Velabrum, over the Cloaca Maxima drain that went from the Forum to the River Tiber.

The significance of the arch is poorly understood: it is thought to have been a boundary marker rather than a triumphal arch. An alternative view is that it was built to provide shelter for the traders at the Forum Boarium cattle market. Some researchers believe it was dedicated to Constantine I or Constantius II and was known as the Arch of the deified Constantine. It is 16 meters high and 12 meters wide; it was originally higher, but the attic storey was removed in 1830 in the erroneous belief it was all medieval.

Its modern name probably dates from the Renaissance or later, and was not used to describe it in classical antiquity. The name is derived from the structure's four-fronted, four-arched configuration. The ancient Roman god Janus (Ianus Quadrifons), was sometimes depicted with four faces and there are Janus-related structures mentioned in historic descriptions of ancient Rome.

Each pier of the arch has two rows of three niches. It seems logical that statues would have filled these 48 niches but none has been identified. The keystone at the apex of the central arch on the north side is thought to depict Minerva, although others believe it may be Palladium.

== History ==
It was built using spolia, i.e. material from earlier buildings, including bricks, together with pottery shards, and was covered with white marble, also from earlier buildings.

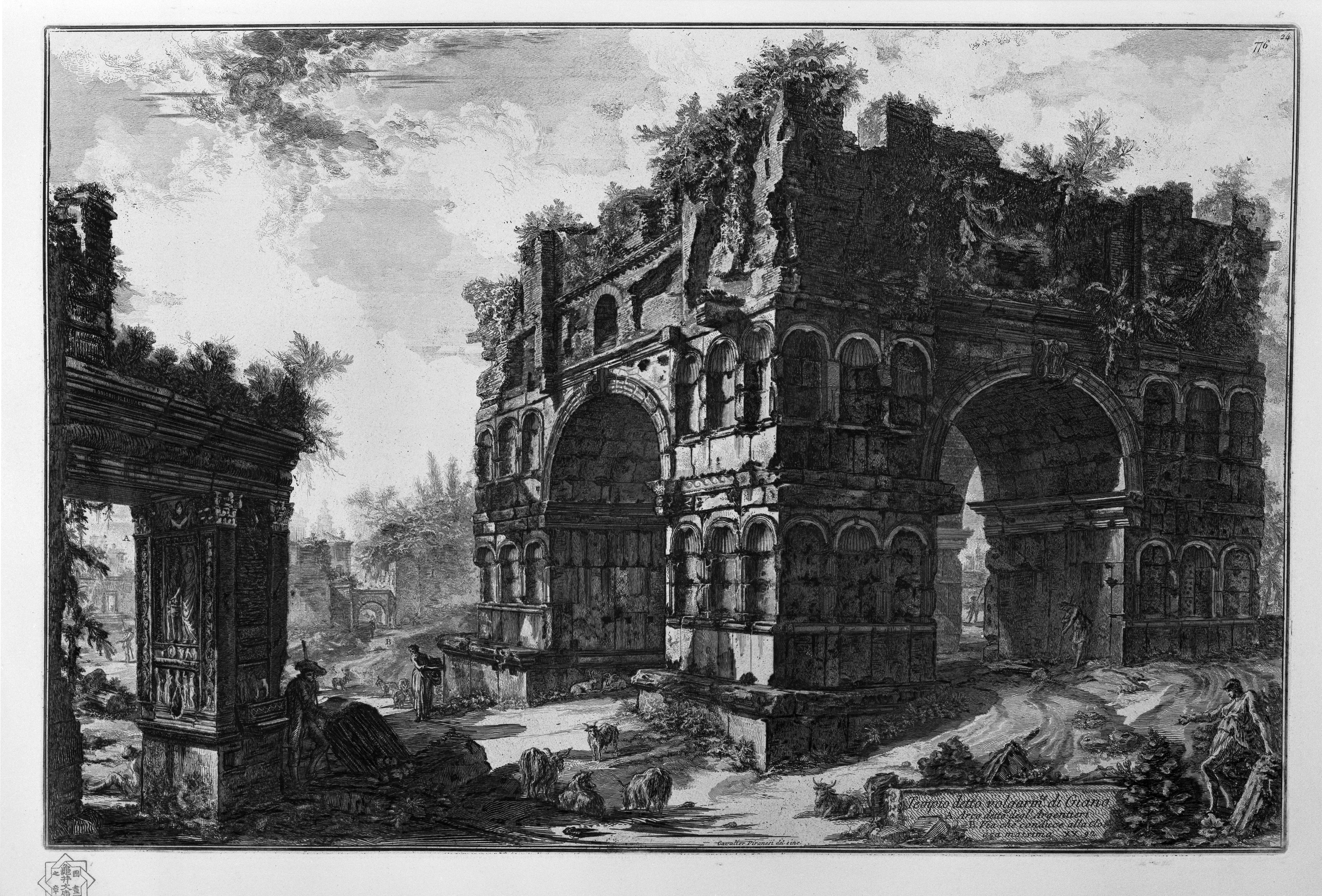
The arch in the mid-18th century; with its upper stage and fortifications still partly intact. Etching by Giovanni Battista Piranesi

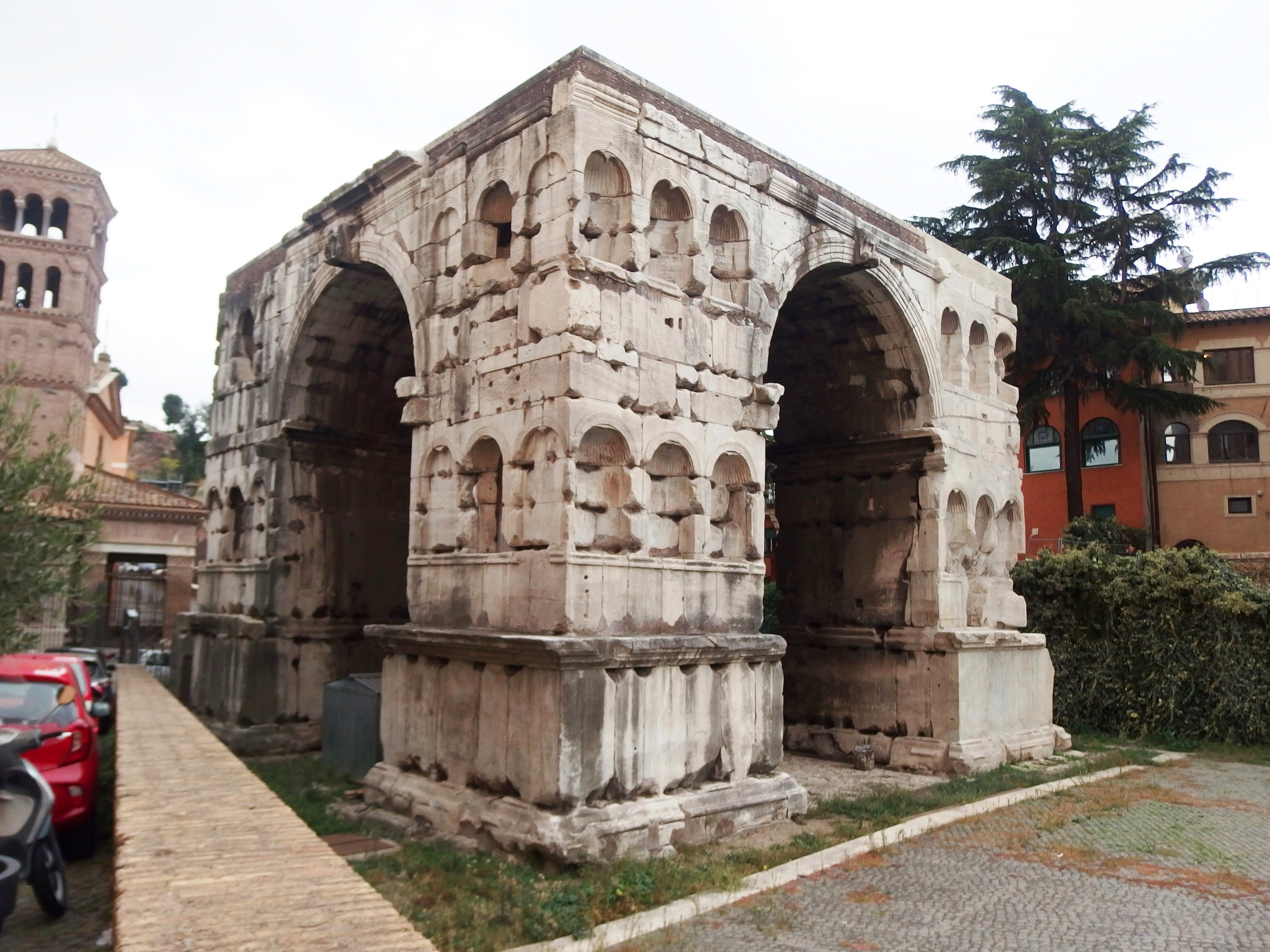
Oblique view

In the Middle Ages, the Frangipane family transformed the building into a fortress, and so it survived intact until 1830. Then, the attic and top were torn down because they were erroneously believed to not belong to the original structure. However, there is a staircase within the north-west pier which would have given access to this top floor. Iron pins originally held together the marble blocks but were removed in the Middle Ages, leading to the monument's present pock-marked look. Fragments of the dedicatory inscription are still preserved inside the nearby church of San Giorgio in Velabro.

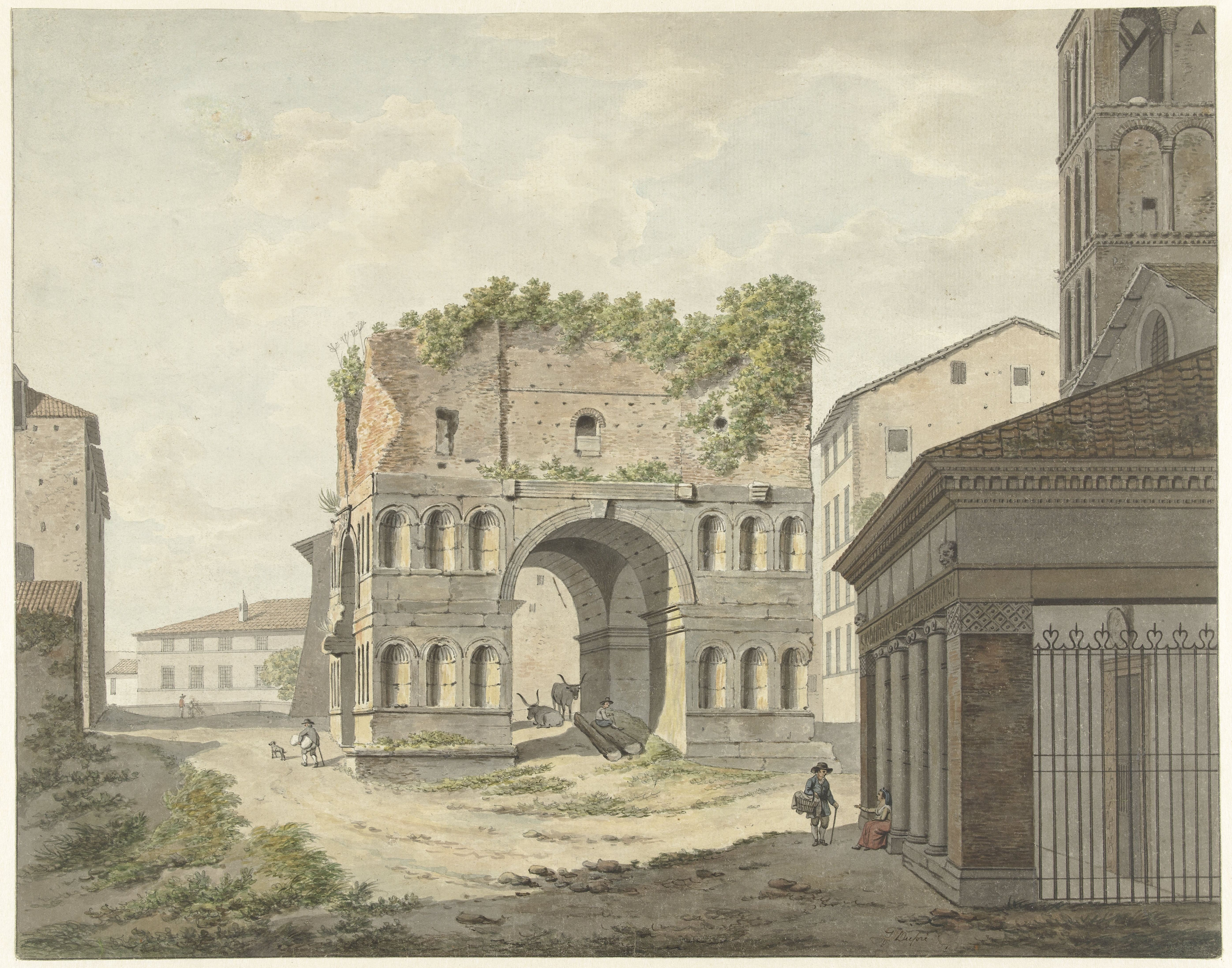
Watercolour by Daniël Dupré, 1790s

The arch has not been accessible to the public since the explosion of a bomb in front of San Giorgio in Velabro, on the night of 27 July 1993. It is the one monument of the Forum Boarium that remains unrestored. The Arch of Malborghetto, just outside Rome, also includes the remnants of a former Roman quadrifons arch.

== See also ==
- Arch of Septimius Severus – Ancient Roman triumphal arch, a landmark of Rome, Italy
- List of Roman triumphal arches
- List of ancient monuments in Rome

Preceded by Arch of Drusus	Landmarks of Rome; Arch of Janus	Succeeded by Arch of Septimius Severus
