= Arch of Malborghetto =

Coordinates: 42°03′08″N 12°29′13″E

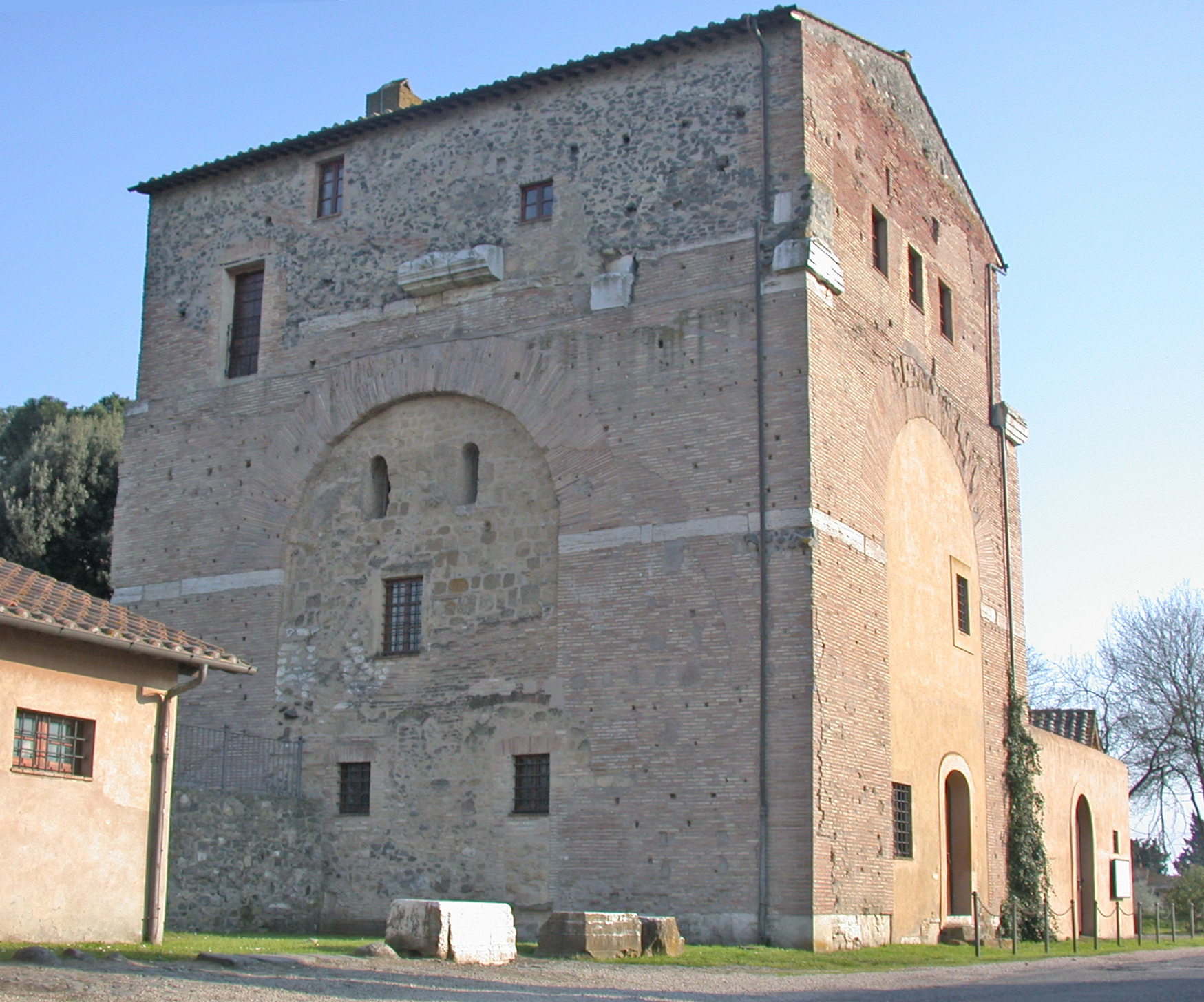
- The arch or house of Malborghetto
- Interactive map of Arch of Malborghetto
- Type: Tetrapylon
- Location: Malborgetto, Rome, Lazio, Italy

History
- Built: c.AD 315
- Built by: Constantine I

The Arch of Malborghetto is an Ancient Roman quadrifrons arch (that is, an arch with four pylons) located nineteen kilometres north of Rome on the via Flaminia. Today, because of reuse over the centuries, it is part of a mass of construction which appears to be a Medieval structure at first sight. Nevertheless, the core of the structure is datable to the first half of the fourth century. The original marble coating has been completely lost.

== History ==
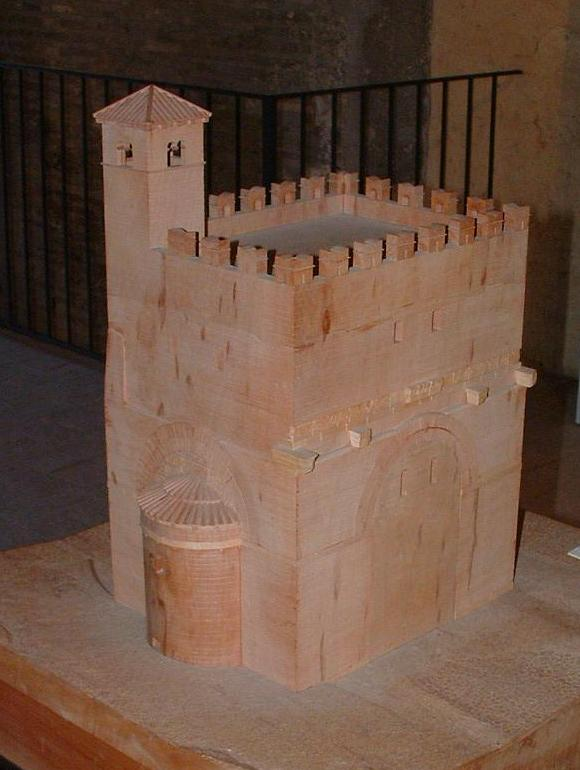
Ceramic model of the Arch of Malborghetto transformed into a church

What today looks like an austere house was in fact a quadrifrons arch similar in appearance and scale to the so-called Arch of Janus in the Velabrum (actually named the Arch of the Divine Constantine), in Roman times. The arch's current name (House or Arch of Malborghetto) derives from the place where it is located, Malborghetto. It contains a museum and a branch of the Superintendency of Cultural Properties.

The arch's vault stood over the crossroads of two important roads, the Via Flaminia and the Via Veientana, interesting remains of which have been brought to light in the area around the monument.

The first official notice regarding the building dates to 1256 and is found in a deed of sale of the Orsini family, where it is mentioned as the site of a tiny village protected by a double wall. In the medieval period, perhaps the Eleventh century, the arch was transformed into a Greek-cross church through the closure of the four archways and the construction of an apse on the east side. The paved road running under the vault was diverted. The toponym Malborghetto (literally "evil-ville" or "pain-ville") is more recent and is thought to refer to the sudden devastation at the hands of the Orsini in 1485 to drive off the Colonna who had taken possession of it with the permission of the Pope.

The building was completely abandoned until the middle of the sixteenth century, when a Milanese aromatarius (herbalist) who had resided at Rome, Constantino Pietrasanta, rented it and completely rebuilt it. The arch's current appearance is largely due to the changes brought about by Pietrasanta. In the following centuries, it was put to use at different times as a tavern, a house, and post office.

An important moment for the realisation of the origins of the arch occurred at the beginning of the twentieth century, when the young German archaeologist Fritz Töbelmann, who had been studying it for five years, came to the conclusion that the arch was built before the end of the fourth century. Töbelmann came to this position thanks to a detailed inspection of the construction, in the course of which he discovered a brick stamp from the era of Diocletian (r.284-305) under the plaster on one of the bricks of the arch's central vault. This allowed him to demonstrate that the date of the monument's construction could not be earlier than this period.

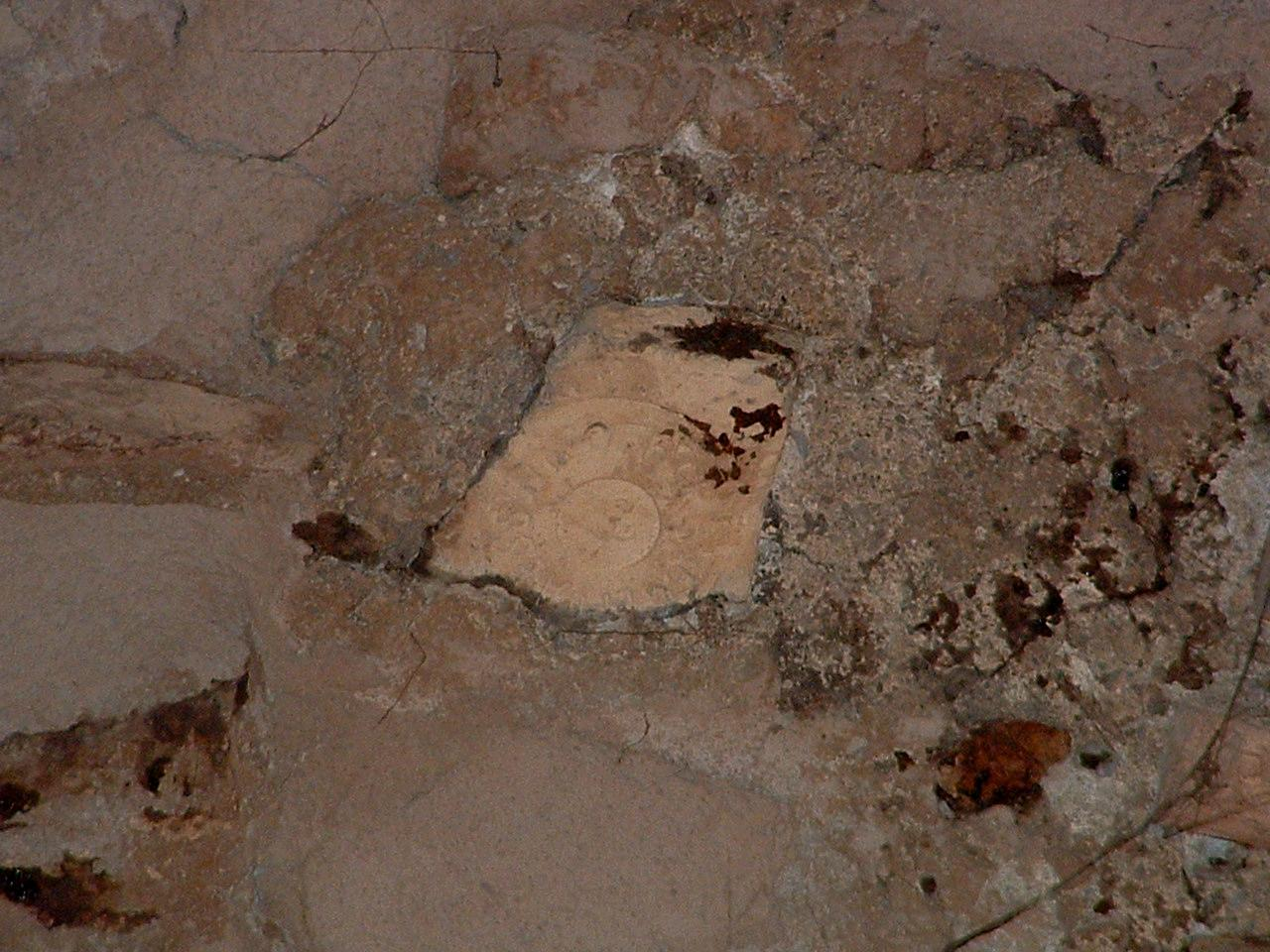
Diocletianic brick stamp

Töbelmann died in the First World War, leaving behind interesting insights for deeper study by future scholars. In fact, Töbelmann's description of the appearance that the monument must have originally taken is accurate in many respects, but he is most important for his first-hand observations. He was the first to suggest that the monument had been erected in the place where the troops of Constantine I had camped before the attack on Maxentius, because if he had wanted to commemorate the victory, he would have placed a monument at the location of the battle's beginning (i.e. Saxa Rubra) or at the location of its successful conclusion (i.e. the Milvian Bridge). It remains curious, however, since it is unusual to commemorate the location of the castra aestiva (the "summer camp", i.e. the campaign camp), which has led scholars to suppose that the monument could have been intended to commemorate the legendary vision that Constantine is reported to have had the day before his battle with Maxentius. More recent studies by Gaetano Messineo have substantially confirmed the deductions of Töbelmann.

== Architecture ==
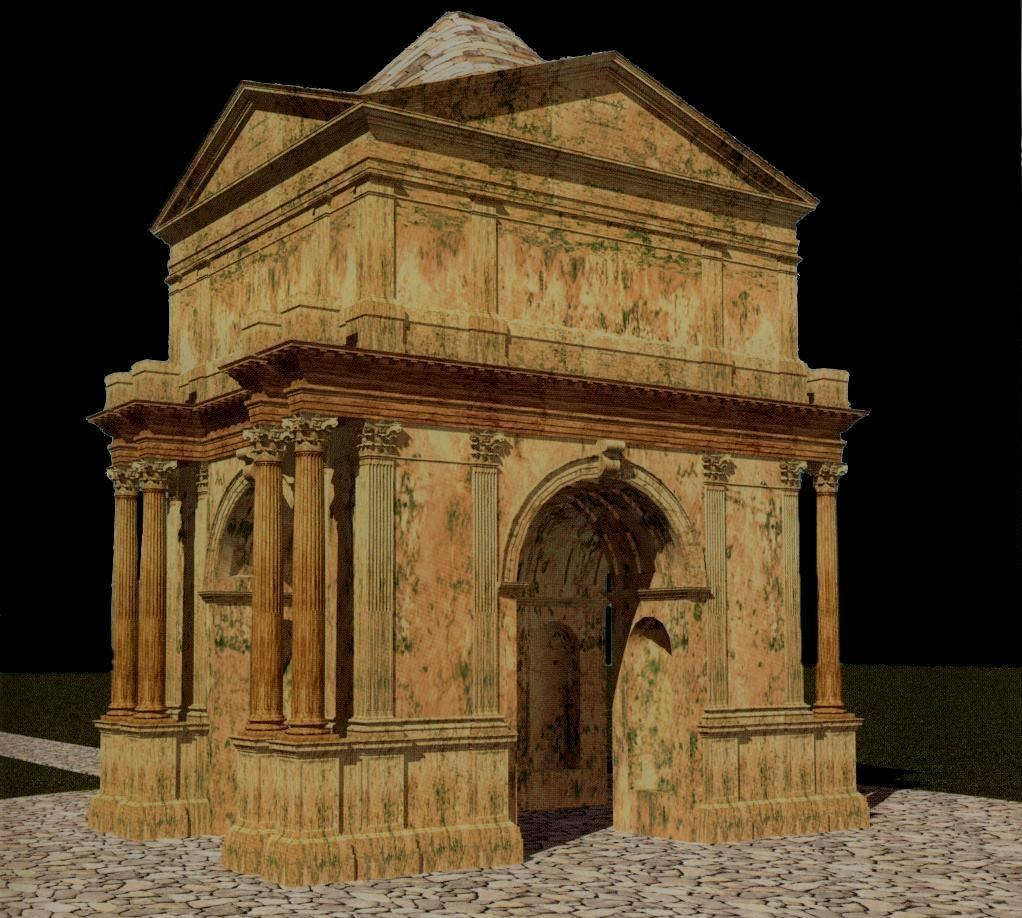
3D reconstruction of the Arch of Malborghetto by Prof. Alberto and Marco Carpiceci

The structure of the original construction was that of a quadrifrons with a rectangular floorplan (14.86 x 11.87 metres) at an imposing scale (it is believed to have been around 18 metres high) and on the same plan as the so-called Arch of Janus as can be seen from the travertine pedestals of the four pylons.

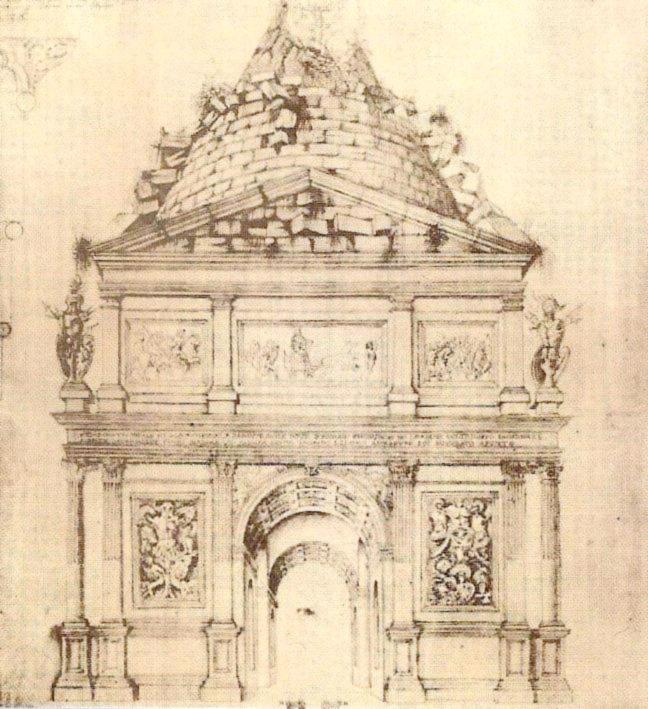
Sketched reconstruction of the Arch of Malborghetto by Sangallo

The brick masonry of the structure is visible. It is assumed that a coating of marble plates was attached by means of metal links; four holes for these links are still visible on the external walls. It is believed that there were columns on two of the four sides, surmounted by an imposing entablature. The attic supported a small roof and was divided on the inside by two walls which created three rooms linked by arched doors.

The via Flaminia passed under the building from north to south and the via Veientana from west to east. Some remains of the paving are still present inside the house and in the arch's external perimeter.

The architect Giuliano da Sangallo, one of the greatest artists of the Renaissance, is responsible for the first sketched reconstruction of the monument's original appearance. Later, Fritze Töbelmann also produced a sketch reconstruction and recent studies have enabled the production of a new model using 3D technology.

== See also ==
- Constantine I
- In hoc signo vinces
- Battle of the Milvian Bridge

== Bibliography ==
- Fritz Toebelmann, Der Bogen von Malborghetto, Carl Winter, Heidelberg 1915.
- Carmelo Calci and Gaetano Messineo, Malborghetto, lavori e studi di archeologia pubblicati dalla Soprintendenza archeologica di Roma, De Luca Edizioni d'Arte, Roma 1989.
- Gaetano Messineo, La via Flaminia, Roma 1991.
- Alberto Carpiceci and Marco Carpiceci, Come Costantin chiese Silvestro d'entro Siratti - Costantino il grande, San Silvestro e la nascita delle prime grandi basiliche cristiane, Edizioni Kappa, Roma 2006.
