= Daniël Dupré =

Dutch engraver, painter, draftsman, and watercolorist

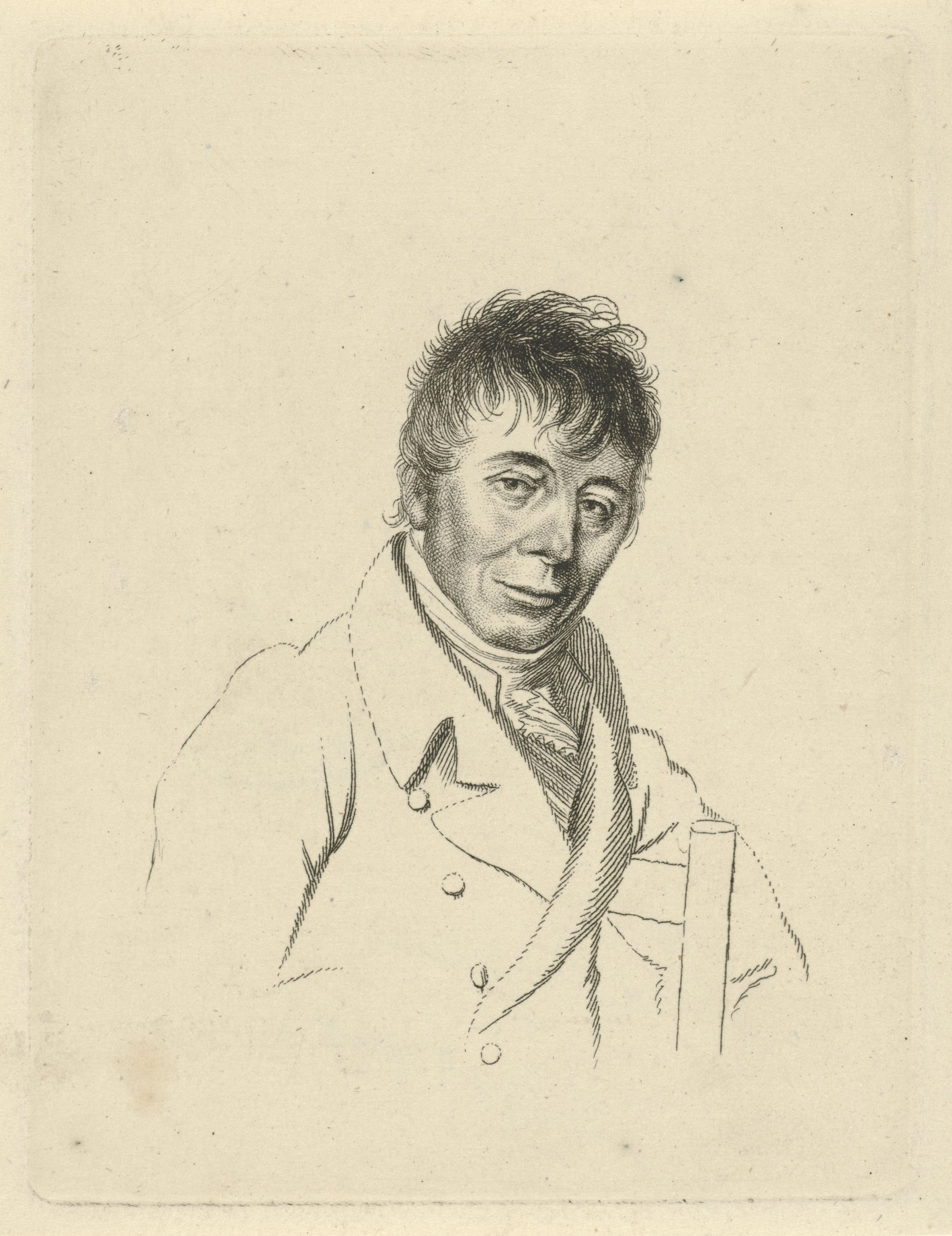
- Born: Daniël Dupré; 20 December 1751; Amsterdam
- Died: 4 June 1817 (aged 65); Amsterdam

Daniël Dupré (20 December 1751 – 4 June 1817) was a Dutch engraver, painter, draftsman, and watercolorist. He was born in Amsterdam and primarily lived and worked there. His paintings and prints depict mostly buildings and landscapes.

Daniël studied under Jurriaan Andriessen at the Stadstekenacademie (City Drawing School). He travelled around Germany and Italy where he visited Düsseldorf, Rome, and Mannheim, before ultimately returning to Amsterdam.

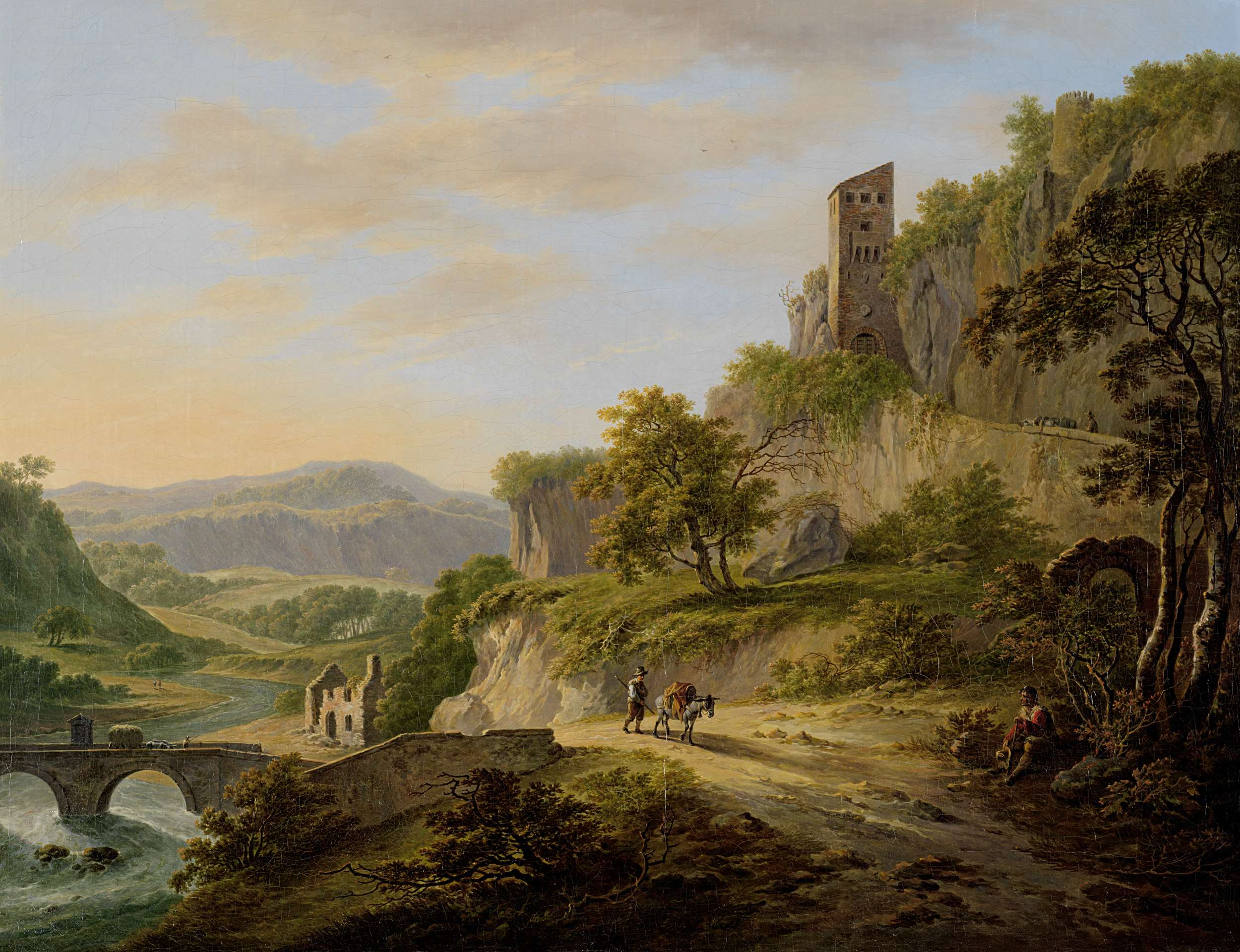
View of Civita Castellana, ca. 1792–1809, Rijksmuseum Amsterdam

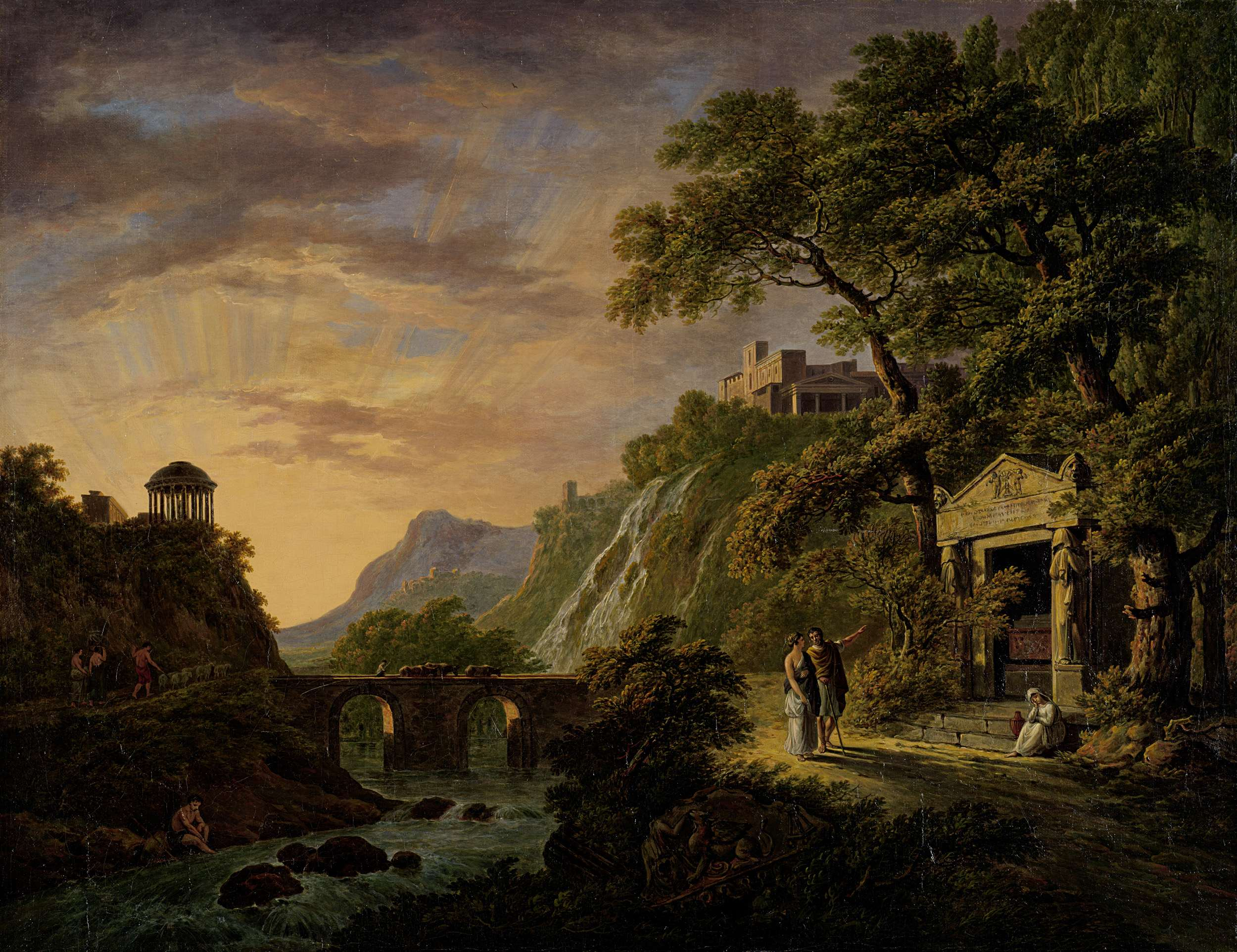
Arcadian landscape with setting sun, ca. 1792–1809, Rijksmuseum Amsterdam

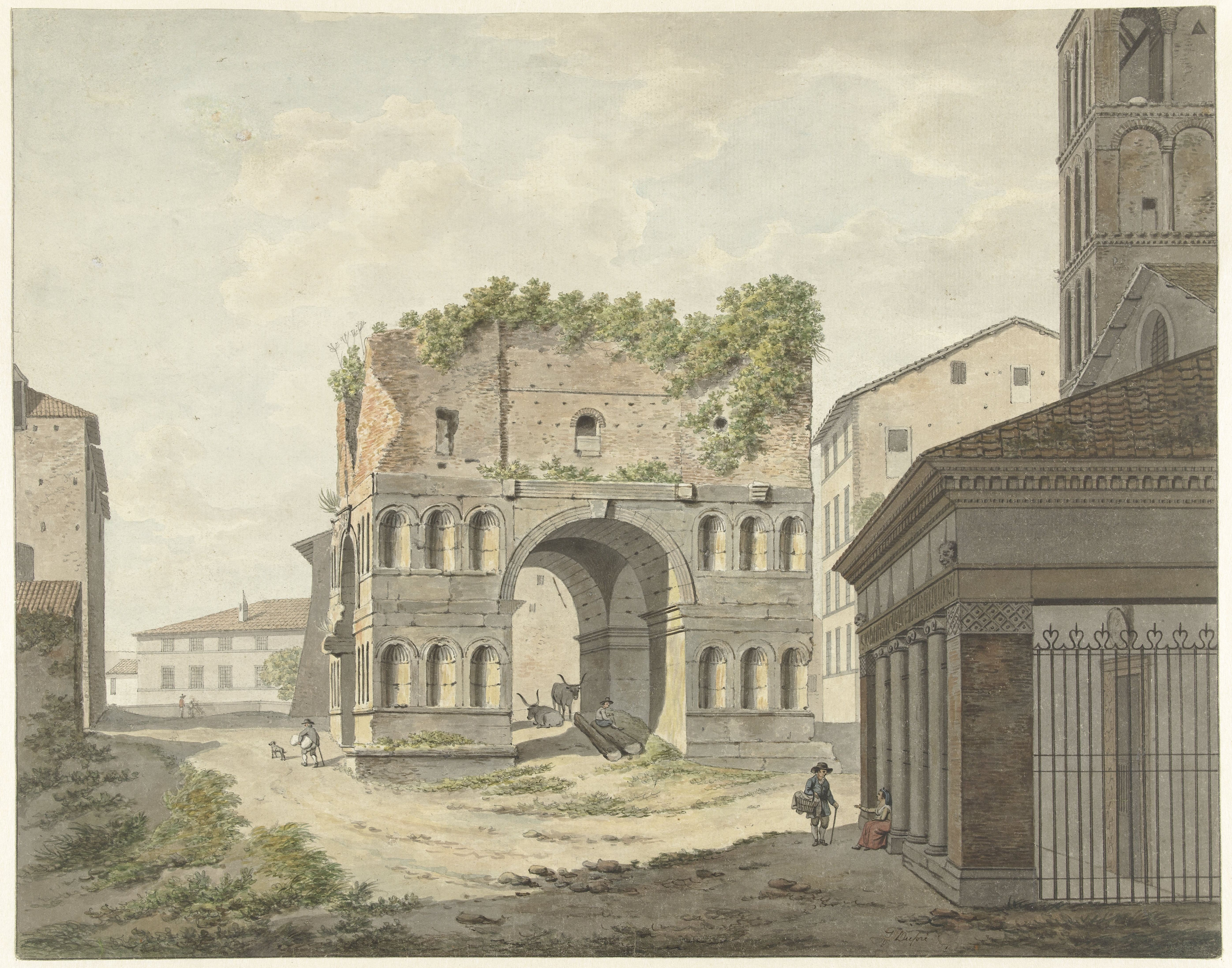
Watercolour of the Arch of Janus in Rome
