= Arch of Septimius Severus (Leptis Magna) =

Roman triumphal arch in Libya

- لَبْدَة (Arabic)
- Lepcis Magna
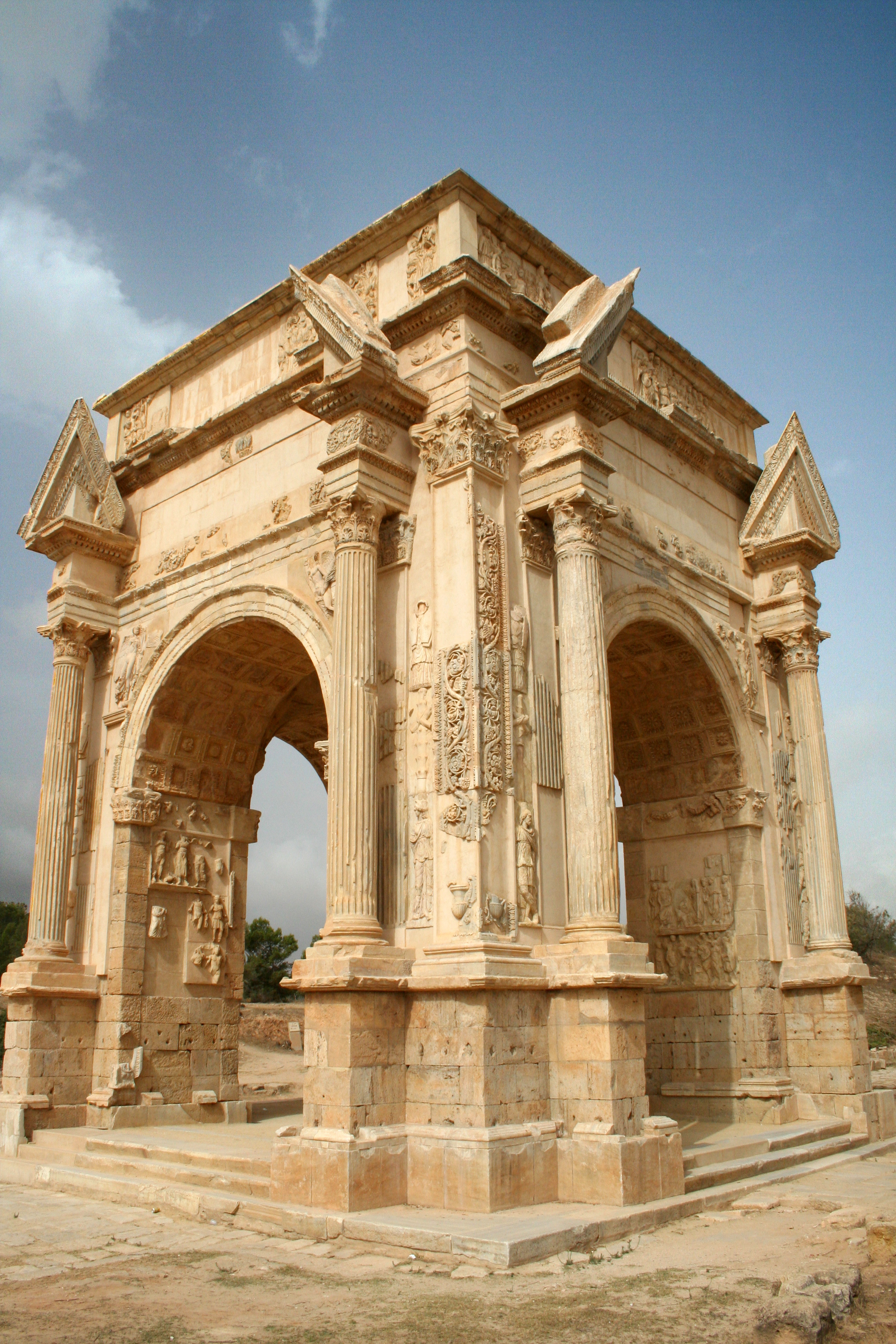
- The Arch of Septimius Severus, in 2006

- Location within Libya
- 32°38′3″N 14°17′41″E
- Type: triumphal arch
- Cultures: Roman
- Location: Khoms, Libya
- Region: Tripolitania

History
- Built: c. 203
- Built by: Septimius Severus

Site notes
- Excavation dates: 1928
- Archaeologists: Giacomo Guidi
- Condition: Restored to original state

UNESCO World Heritage Site
- Official name: Archaeological Site of Leptis Magna
- Type: Cultural
- Criteria: i, ii, iii
- Designated: 1982 (6th session)
- Reference no.: 183
- Region: Arab States

The Arch of Septimius Severus is a third-century triumphal arch in the ruined Roman city of Leptis Magna, in present-day Libya. It was commissioned by the Roman Emperor Septimius Severus, who was born in the city. The arch fell into ruin in the fifth century, and was rebuilt through anastylosis by archaeologists after its rediscovery in 1928.

== Context ==
The Emperor Septimius Severus (r. 193–211) ruled through a period of architectural revival. He was the first Emperor born in the provinces since Hadrian and Trajan. He was popular for his military successes, especially those over the Parthian Empire from 194 to 195. He had been declared emperor by his troops. With the military success of the Emperor came a dramatic building program in Rome as well as in his city of birth, Leptis Magna, which is now a World Heritage Site. Part of his building programs, erected to celebrate the triumph of the Parthian victories, were two arches in Rome as well as one in Leptis Magna.

While the exact date is not agreed upon, it is generally accepted that the Arch of Septimius Severus at Leptis Magna was erected on the occasion of the Severus' African tour in 203. Built as a tetrapylon, the four-way arch marks the intersection of the two most significant urban roads, the cardo, north–south direction, and the Decumanus Maximus, the main east–west thoroughfare of this once-prominent port city of the Roman Empire in Africa. The city as well as the arch fell into ruin and was abandoned after barbarian invasions of the late 5th century. Justinian later appropriated Leptis Magna, utilizing sculpture from the arch in his great basilica.

== Description ==
The central arch is made of a limestone core and a marble facing featured elaborately decorated panels. There are four primary frieze panels, depicting the imperial family in scenes of the triumph, procession, sacrifice, and Concordia Augustorum. Other areas are decorated with ornate deeply drilled floral and other ornaments.

Beyond the central attic frieze, the arch is relatively uniform on all sides. Framed by eight Corinthian columns that support a broken pediment, the arch is ornate featuring the blending of Hellenistic elements. Not typical of Roman architecture, the Arch's broken pediment draws from an eastern tradition extending from Asia to Palestine. Besides, the columns are Corinthian pilasters decorated in deep-drilled vine scrolls, between which are trophies supported by captive barbarians. All eight spandrels bear Victory holding a wreath and a palm branch, commemorative of the triumph. Above the columns is a frieze decorated with acanthus above, which is a frieze of erotes holding a garland. All four exterior faces share these basic decorative elements, varying only in the central frieze decoration.

The northeast frieze, facing the rival city of Leptis, Oea, depicts the triumph. Similar in representation to the Arch of Titus and The Arch of Marcus Aurelius, the program depicts galloping horses with riders in an attempted illusionistic manner. Like Titus, the togatus is depicted in a horizontal field, showing vivid movement as the togatus riders are shown with great attention to the detail in the fabric of their togatus. In front of these is the chariot driven by a quadriga, or four horses are shown in profile. The chariot carries three central figures: Septimius Severus, Caracalla, and Geta, showing the dynastic succession.

To legitimate their rule, the Severans assimilated themselves to the Antonines, the most recent dynasty to occupy the throne, therefore elements of their imperial arts perfectly attribute to his dynastic intentions. Although typical triumphal scenes depict a slave or Victory holding a crown above the victor, there is none present; instead, the chariot is decorated with images of Cyble, Hercules and Venus. The divine iconography aligns a contemporary scene with the divine, a symbolic program used by emperors such as Trajan as well as the alignment of both Roman and eastern deities. The triumph is preceded by togatus accompanied by female captives.

A similar pictorial program is followed on the other relief friezes. The costume is deeply drilled as to show the definition of the folding with little attention paid to the body forms underneath. While elements of the arch are “severan baroque” they do not adhere to the baroque ideology of motion. The other reliefs depict ritual and civic activities involving the family. This seeks to show the succession of the family, as well as the military successes against the Parthians. The repetition of captives shows the significance of the victories and the approval of the gods. Both Roman and Provincial gods are present in the relief scenes, seeking to declare the role the Severans would play in Rome and their desire to aid the Provinces.

== Excavation ==
The Arch of Septimius Severus at Leptis Magna was discovered in ruins in 1928, and pieced back together by archaeologists. When Giacomo Guidi found the arch, it was completely fragmented, showing only the base structure, buried underneath the sand. It needed extensive excavation and reconstruction.

== See also ==
- List of Roman triumphal arches
- Arch of Septimius Severus in Rome

== Sources ==
- "Lepcis Magna, Arch of Septimius Severus", Livius.org
- Entry in Encyclopedia of the History of Classical Archaeology, p. 70, ed. Nancy Thomson de Grummond, 2015 edn (1996 1st ed.), Taylor & Francis, ISBN 9781134268542
