= Oea =

Ancient city in present-day Centreville à le Souq Yafran, in Tripoli, Libya

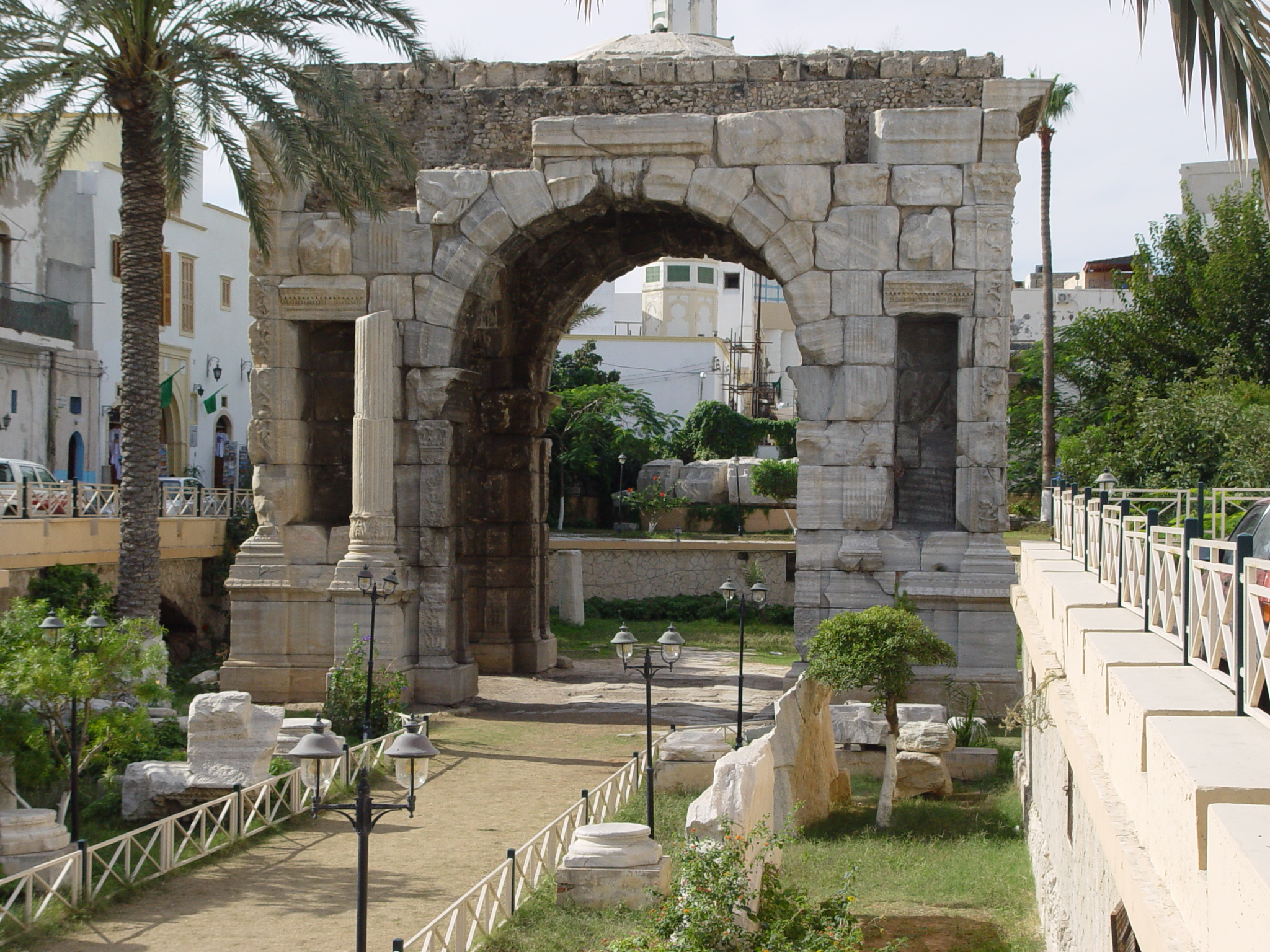
The Arch of Marcus Aurelius in Oea

Oea (/ˈiːə/; Ancient Greek: Ἐώα) was an ancient city in present-day Tripoli, Libya. It was founded by the Phoenicians in the 7th century BC and later became a Roman–Berber colony. As part of the Roman Africa Nova province, Oea and surrounding Tripolitania were prosperous. It reached its height in the 2nd and 3rd centuries AD, when the city experienced a golden age under the Severan dynasty in nearby Leptis Magna. The city was conquered by the Rashidun Caliphate with the spread of Islam in the 7th century and came to be known as Tripoli during the 9th century.

== History ==
=== Antiquity ===
The city was founded in the 7th century BC by the Phoenicians, who gave it the Libyco-Berber name Oyat (Punic: 𐤅𐤉𐤏𐤕, wyʿt), suggesting that the city may have been built upon an existing native Berber village. The Phoenicians were probably attracted to the site by its natural harbour, flanked on the western shore by the small, easily defensible peninsula, on which they established their colony. The city then passed into the hands of the Greek rulers of Cyrenaica as Oea (Ancient Greek: Οἴα, Oía). Cyrene was a colony on the North African shore, a bit east of Tambroli and halfway to Egypt. The Carthaginians later wrested it again from the Greeks.

By the later half of the 2nd century BC, Oea was conquered by the Romans, who included it in their province of Africa, and gave it the name of Regio Syrtica. Around the beginning of the 3rd century AD, it became known as the Regio Tripolitana, meaning "region of the three cities" (namely Oea (modern Tripoli of Libya), Sabratha and Leptis Magna). It was probably raised to the rank of a separate province by Septimius Severus, who was a native of Leptis Magna.

In spite of centuries of Roman habitation, the only visible Roman remains, apart from scattered columns and capitals (usually integrated in later buildings), is the Arch of Marcus Aurelius from the 2nd century AD. There are also remains of a little temple called Genius Coloniae, conserved in Tripoli Museum.

The principal surviving monument (of Oea) is an elaborately ornamental quadrifrons archway dedicated to M. Aurelius and L. Verus in A.D. 163, the central stone dome of which was carried on flat slabs laid across the angles and was concealed externally within the masonry of an attic, now destroyed. Early drawings show this attic in turn supporting a circular pavilion, but this seems to have been a later Islamic addition. The arch stood at the intersection of the two main streets of the town and the adjoining streets and alleyways of the post-Classical town incorporate many elements of an orthogonal street plan. Near the arch are the remains of a temple dedicated to the Genius Colonine (A.D. 183–85), and the forum probably lay nearby. There was a monumental bath on or near the site of the present castle. The city walls, demolished in 1913, incorporated long stretches of the late antique defenses.Richard Stillwell. Perseus

The fact that Tripoli has been continuously inhabited, unlike Sabratha and Leptis Magna, has meant that the inhabitants have either quarried material from older buildings (destroying them in the process), or built on top of them, burying them beneath the streets, where they remain largely unexcavated.

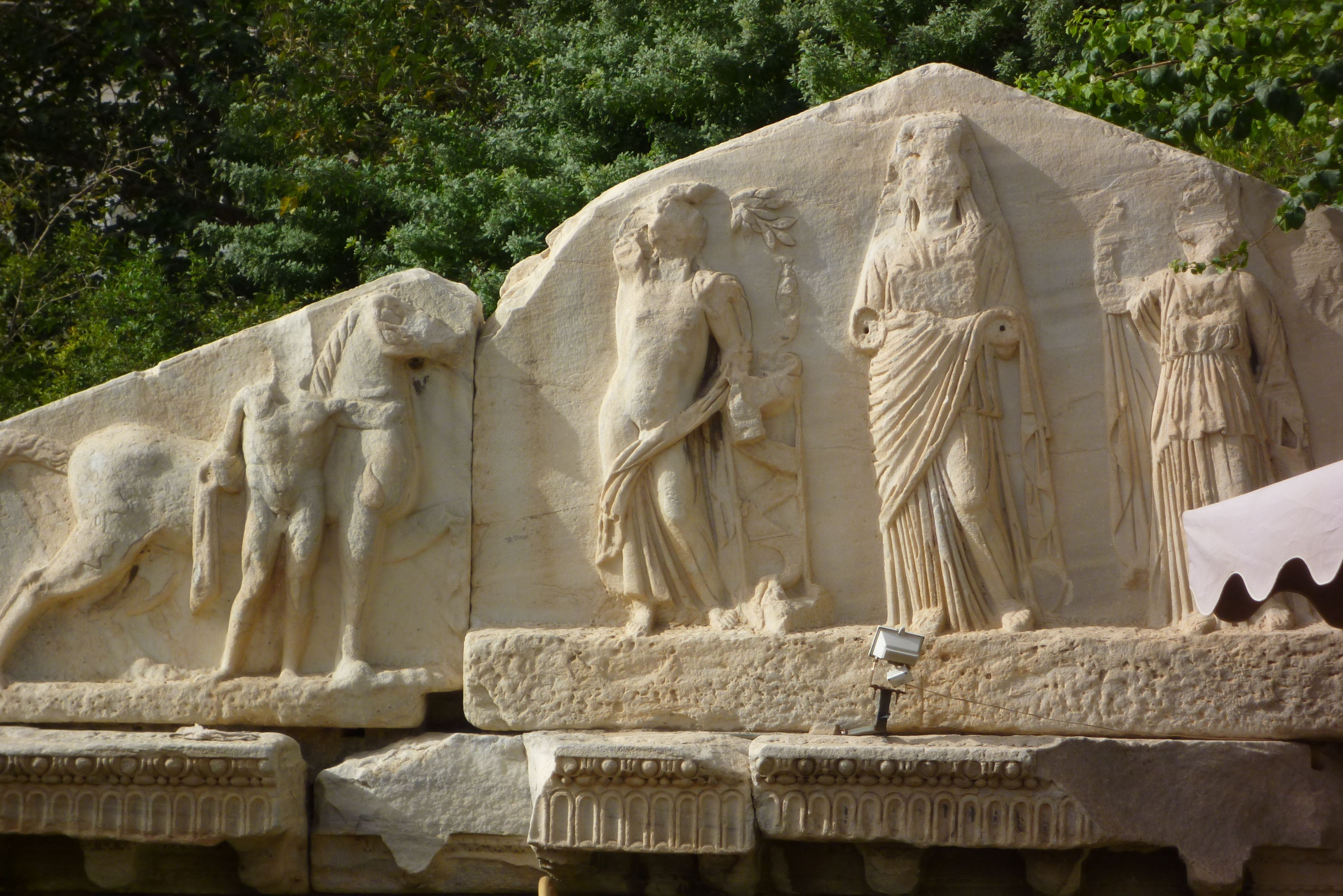
Frontal section of the Temple "Genius Coloniae"

Most of the Oea inhabitants continued to use the Punic language (mixed with autochthonous Libyan-Berber words) until the end of the 3rd century, even if Latin was the official language and the one used by the elite in the city. Indeed, in the 6th century, when the city was ruled by the Byzantines, only a few were able to speak Latin and all the others spoke Berber, while Punic had disappeared. The Christian religion coexisted with the pagan religion of the Punic people until the mid-3rd century. The historian Mommsen wrote that only in the 4th century was Christianity adopted by the citizens of Oea as a whole. The city prospered mainly because Rome stopped bandits from plundering the countryside, but also because the Roman Empire – under Trajan and Septimius Severus – curbed unrest among local tribal groups by creating the Limes Tripolitanus and setting up towns such as Gaerisa, forts such as Garbia, and centenaria farms along the southern edge of the Oea territory.

The names of three bishops of Oea are recorded in extant documents. At the Council of Carthage (255), which Cyprian called to discuss baptism administered by heretics, Natalis of Oea spoke in his own name and on behalf of the bishops of Sabratha and Leptis Magna. Marinianus, a Donatist, was at the joint meeting of Catholic and Donatist bishops in Carthage in 411, a time when Oea had no Catholic bishop. Cresconius was one of the Catholic bishops whom Huneric summoned to a meeting at Carthage in 484 and then exiled. Victor Vitensis says Cresconius was already bishop of Oea under King Genseric (428–467). He is mentioned in the Roman Martyrology under 28 November along with other victims of persecution by the Vandals.

Thomas C. Oden says that a bishop of Oea, whom he does not name, was at the Council of Ephesus of 431.

=== Middle Ages ===
The diocese was mentioned in an early 8th-century Notitia Episcopatuum of Alexandria and in that of Byzantine Emperor Leo VI the Wise at the end of the 9th century, No longer a residential bishopric, Oea is today listed by the Catholic Church as a titular see.

There is evidence that the Tripolitania region was in relative economic decline during the 5th and 6th centuries, in part due to the political unrest spreading across the Mediterranean world in the wake of the collapse of the Western Roman Empire, as well as pressure from the invading Vandals. However the Byzantines, under emperor Justinian I, gave some prosperity to the city and probably created Christian churches for the local Berber population of the city and of the surroundings. Indeed, Christianity remained in the Oea/Tripolis area until the 11th century, as can be deduced from archeological research done in the nearby oasis of Gefara (where a Christian community was ruled by a "iudex").

According to Al-Baladhuri, Tripoli was, unlike Western North Africa, taken by the Muslims just after Alexandria, in November 643. Retaken by the Byzantine army a few years later, Oea was finally conquered around 680. Even if partially destroyed, the city did not disappear under the sands in the next two centuries like Sabratha and Leptis Magna, but grew to be the capital of Tripolitania. In the 9th century the name "Oea" was replaced by the present name "Tripoli".

=== Modernity ===
Immediately after the Italian conquest, the Italian administration carried out (mainly from 1919) conservation and restoration work in the city, and the Italian architect Florestano Di Fausto rearranged the area around the Arch of Marcus Aurelius in the 1930s.

== See also ==
- Arch of Marcus Aurelius
- Caesarea of Mauretania
- Cirta
- Diocese of Oea
- Florestano Di Fausto
- Lambaesis
- Leptis Magna
- Colonia (Roman)
- Sabratha
- Thamugadi
- Thubactis
- Thysdrus
- Volubilis
