= Arch of Marcus Aurelius (Tripoli) =

Triumphal arch in Tripoli, Libya

Coordinates: 32°53′59.6″N 13°10′32.7″E

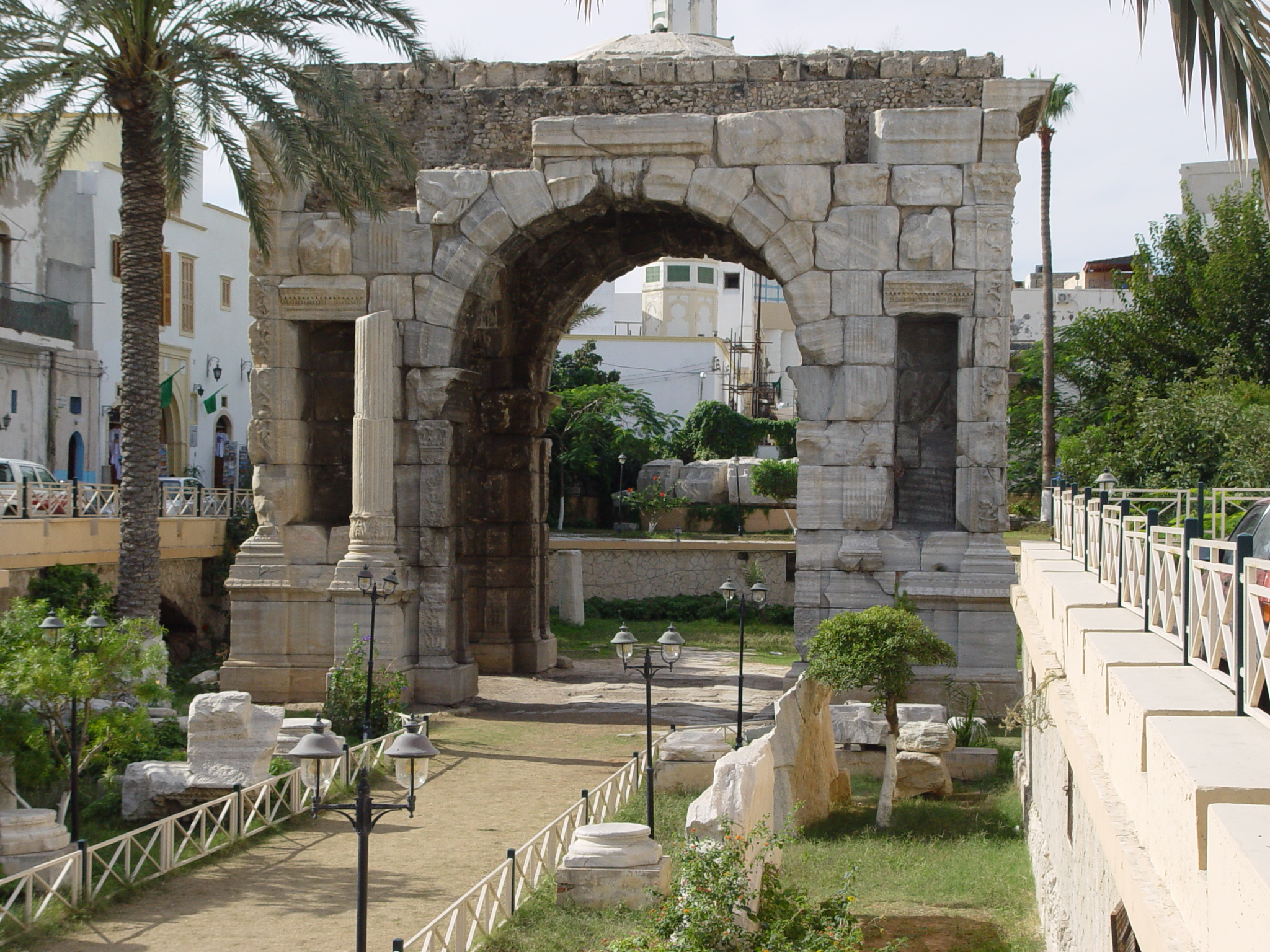
The Arch of Marcus Aurelius

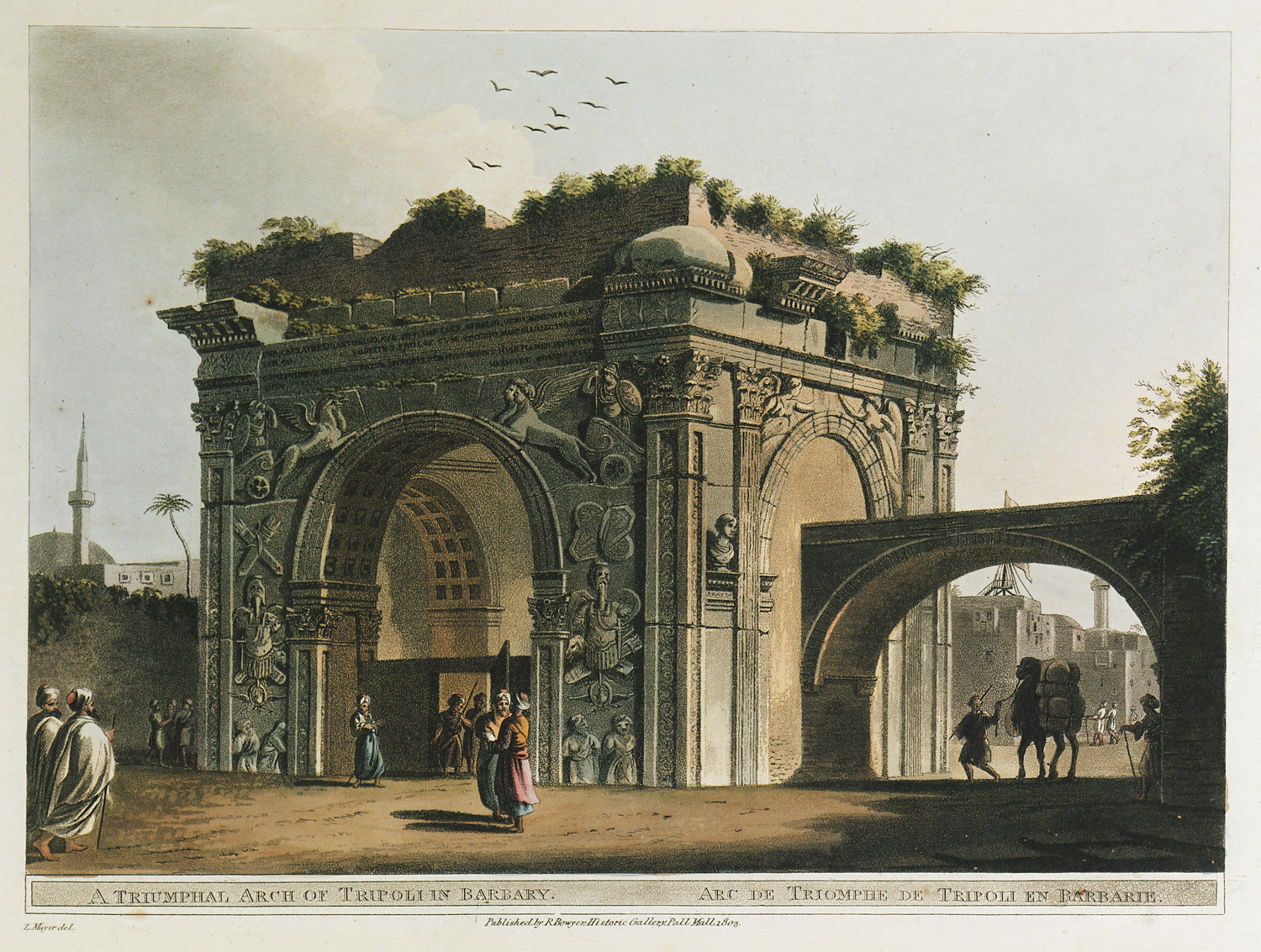
Northern wall of the Marcus Aurelius Arch in Tripoli, from Views in the Ottoman Empire, by Luigi Mayer, 1803

The Arch of Marcus Aurelius (Arabic: قوس ماركوس أوريليوس, romanized: Qaus Mārkūs Aurīliyūs) is a Roman triumphal arch in the city of Oea, modern Tripoli, Libya, where it is found near the northeastern entrance to the Medina.

== Description ==
It is a quadrifrons triumphal arch, surmounted by an unusual octagonal cupola, and was erected (entirely in marble) by Gaius Calpurnius Celsus, quinquennial duumvir of the city, to commemorate the victories of Lucius Verus, junior colleague and adoptive brother of the Emperor Marcus Aurelius, over the Parthians in the Roman–Parthian War of 161–66.

The monument was actually erected in 165, and cannot be dated later, because the Emperor is referred to with the title Armenicus, but not with the titles of Medicus and Parthicus, which were conferred on him in 166.

The patron deities of the city, Apollo and Minerva appear on the two front pediments, in bigae drawn by griffons and sphinxes. Other interpretations take the figures in the bigae as representing Lucius Verus and the goddess Roma, respectively.

The four niches placed on the northeast and southwest faces of the arch are now empty, but they must have contained the statues of the Emperor and Lucius Verus, which were recovered during excavations in the nineteenth century.

The arch has been partially buried in the course of the centuries.

Immediately after the Italian conquest, it received conservation and restoration work from the Italian administration (1914–1918), while the zone around the arch was reorganized by the Italian architect Florestano Di Fausto in the 1930s. It was partially hit during WW2, but suffered only minor damage.

As of 2017, the Arch is suffering from poor maintenance and damage from visitors. Its original features and details have suffered considerable damage due to acid rain.

== See also ==
- List of Roman triumphal arches
- Roman Libya
