= Triumphal arch =

Monumental structure in the form of an archway

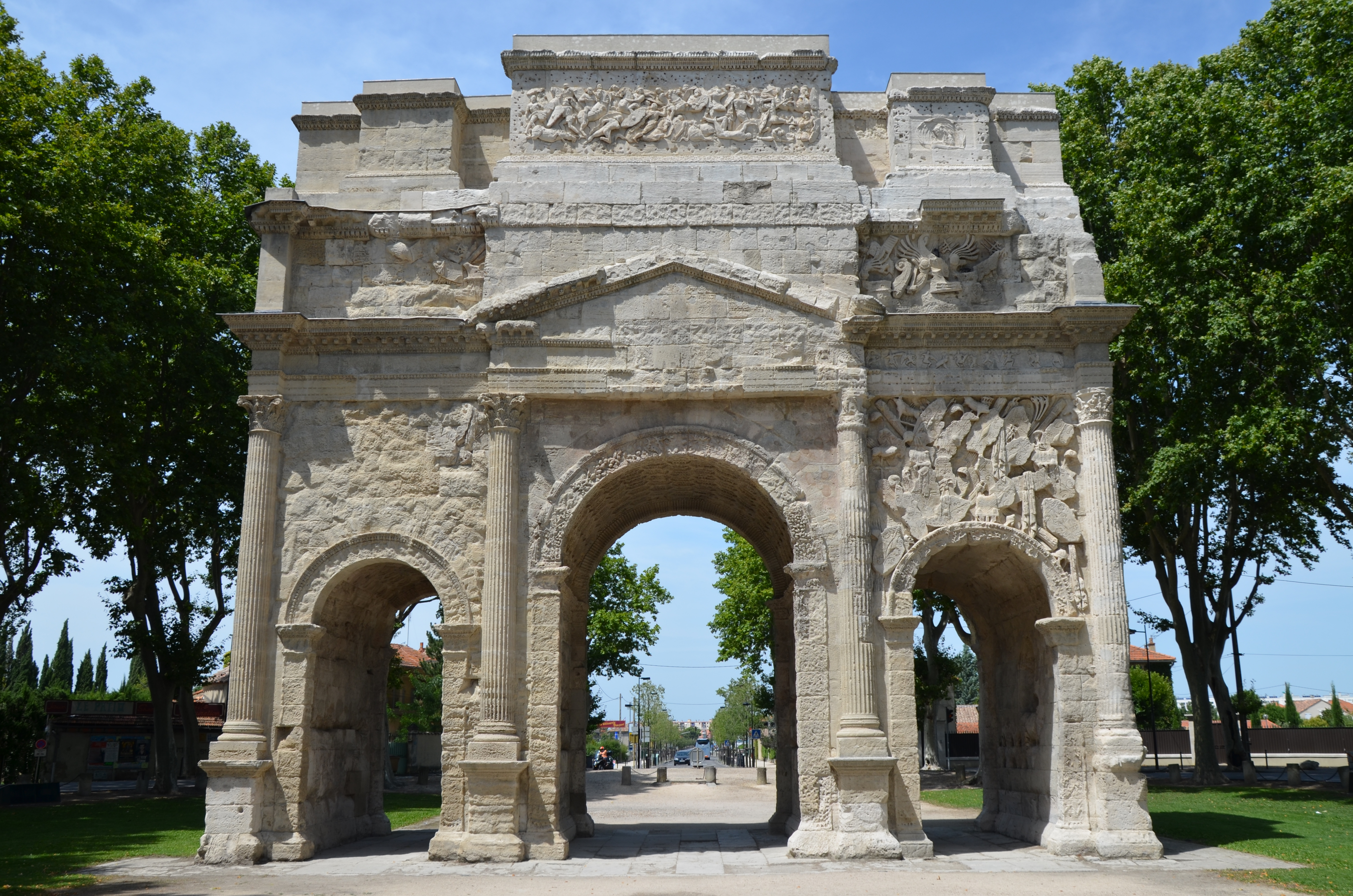
The Triumphal Arch of Orange in Orange, France, the oldest surviving triple-arched Roman triumphal arch, probably built during the reign of Emperor Augustus (27 BC–14 AD), later reconstructed by Emperor Tiberius (c. 20–27 AD)

A triumphal arch is most commonly a free-standing monumental structure in the shape of an archway commemorating a person or an event, or in the context of church architecture it is the arch marking the transition between the nave used by the worshippers, and the sacred space of the sanctuary or choir.

The monumental archway can have one or more arched passageways, is often designed to span a road, and usually stands alone, unconnected to other buildings. In its simplest form, a triumphal arch consists of two massive piers connected by an arch, typically crowned with a flat entablature or attic on which a statue might be mounted or which bears commemorative inscriptions. The main structure is often decorated with carvings, sculpted reliefs, and dedications. More elaborate triumphal arches may have multiple archways, or in a tetrapylon, passages leading in four directions.

The Arc de Triomphe in Paris, begun by Napoleon in 1806

Triumphal arches are one of the most influential and distinctive types of ancient Roman architecture. Effectively invented by the Romans, and using their skill in making arches and vaults, the Roman triumphal arch was used to commemorate victorious generals or significant public events such as the founding of new colonies, the construction of a road or bridge, the death of a member of the imperial family or the accession of a new emperor.

Archaeologists like to distinguish between a true "triumphal arch", built to celebrate an actual Roman triumph, a grand procession declared by the Roman Senate following military victory; a "memorial arch" or "honorary arch", essentially built by emperors to celebrate themselves; and arches, typically in city walls, that are merely grand gateways. Often actual Roman triumphal arches were initially in wood and other rather temporary materials, only later replaced by one in stone; the majority of ancient survivals are actually from the other two groups.

The survival of great Roman triumphal arches such as the Arch of Titus or the Arch of Constantine has inspired many post-Roman states and rulers, up to the present day, to erect their own triumphal arches in emulation of the Romans. Triumphal arches in the Roman style have been built in many cities around the world, including the Arc de Triomphe in Paris, the Narva Triumphal Arch in Saint Petersburg, or Marble Arch and the Wellington Arch in London. After about 1820 arches are often memorial gates and arches built as a form of war memorial, or city gates such as the Brandenburg Gate in Berlin, the Washington Square Arch in New York City, or the India Gate in New Delhi, which although patterned after triumphal arches, were built to memorialise war casualties, to commemorate a civil event (the country's independence, for example), or to provide a monumental entrance to a city, as opposed to celebrating a military success or general.

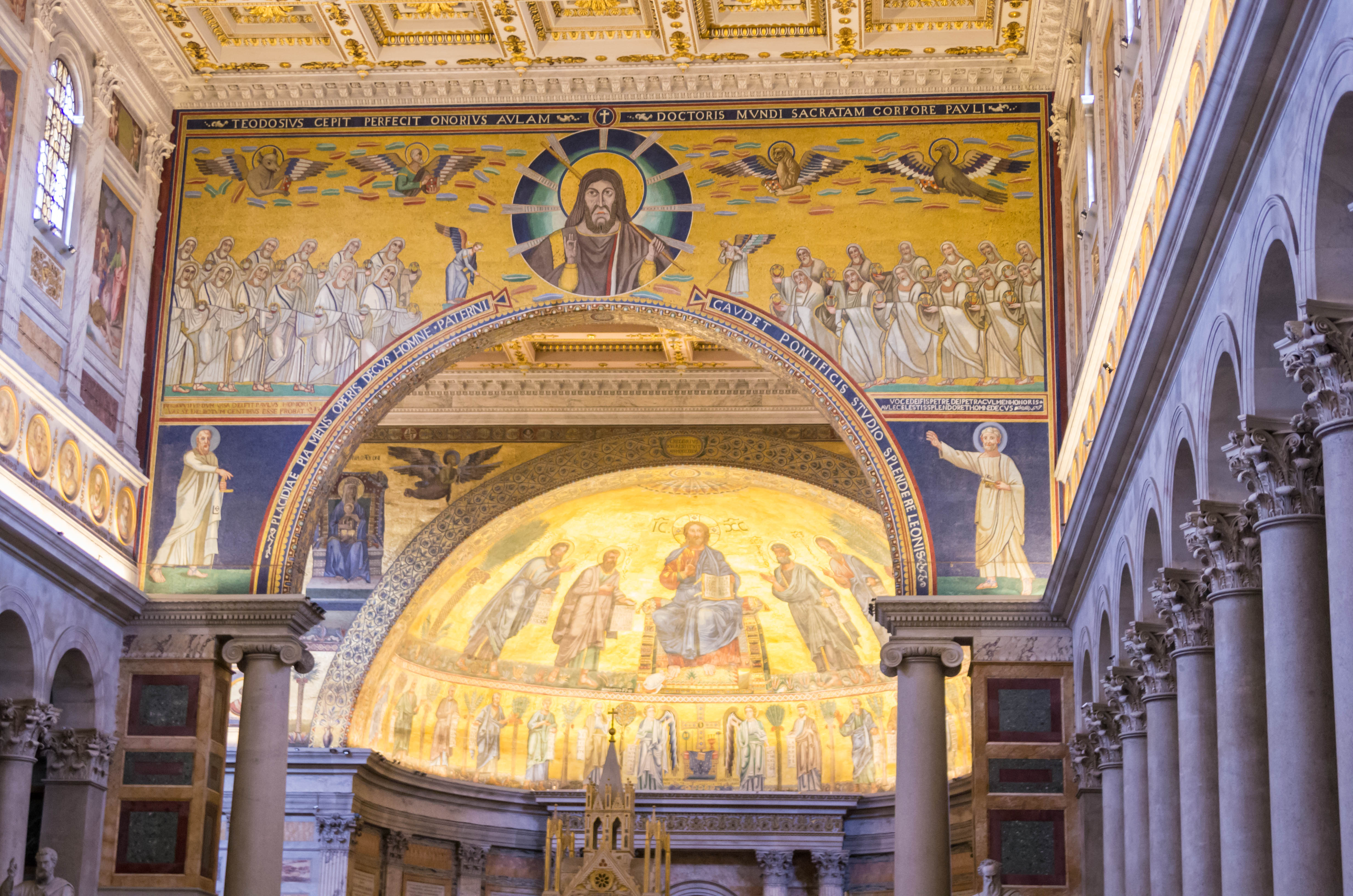
Triumphal arch at the Basilica of Saint Paul Outside the Walls in Rome

In church architecture, "triumphal arch" is the name given to the diaphragm arch above the entrance to the chancel of a medieval church where a rood can be placed. and more generally a combination of "one large and two small doorways", such as Leon Battista Alberti's façades for the Tempio Malatestiano and San Andrea, Mantua.

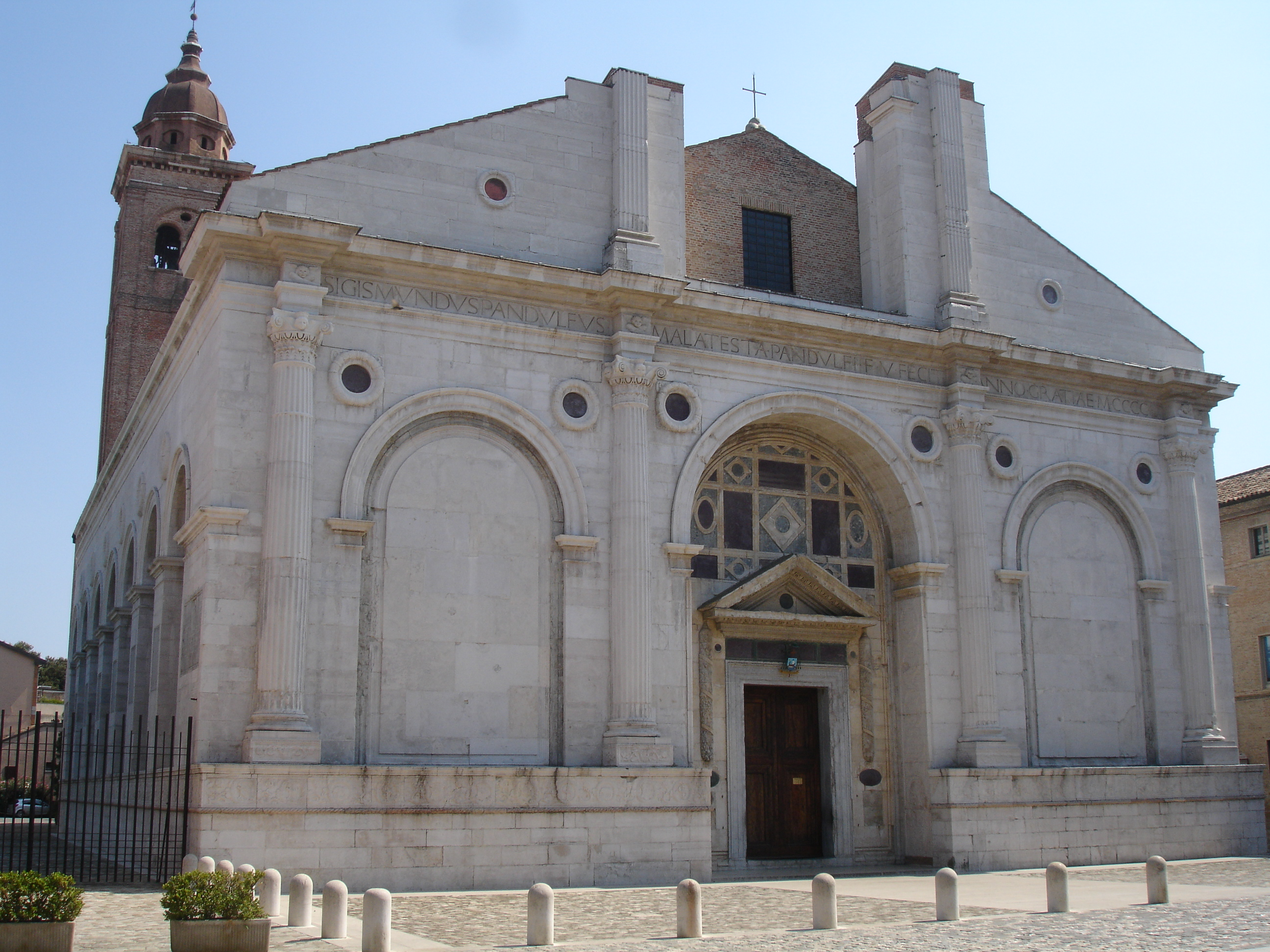
Triple-arch façade of the unfinished Tempio Malatestiano in Rimini

== Origins and development ==
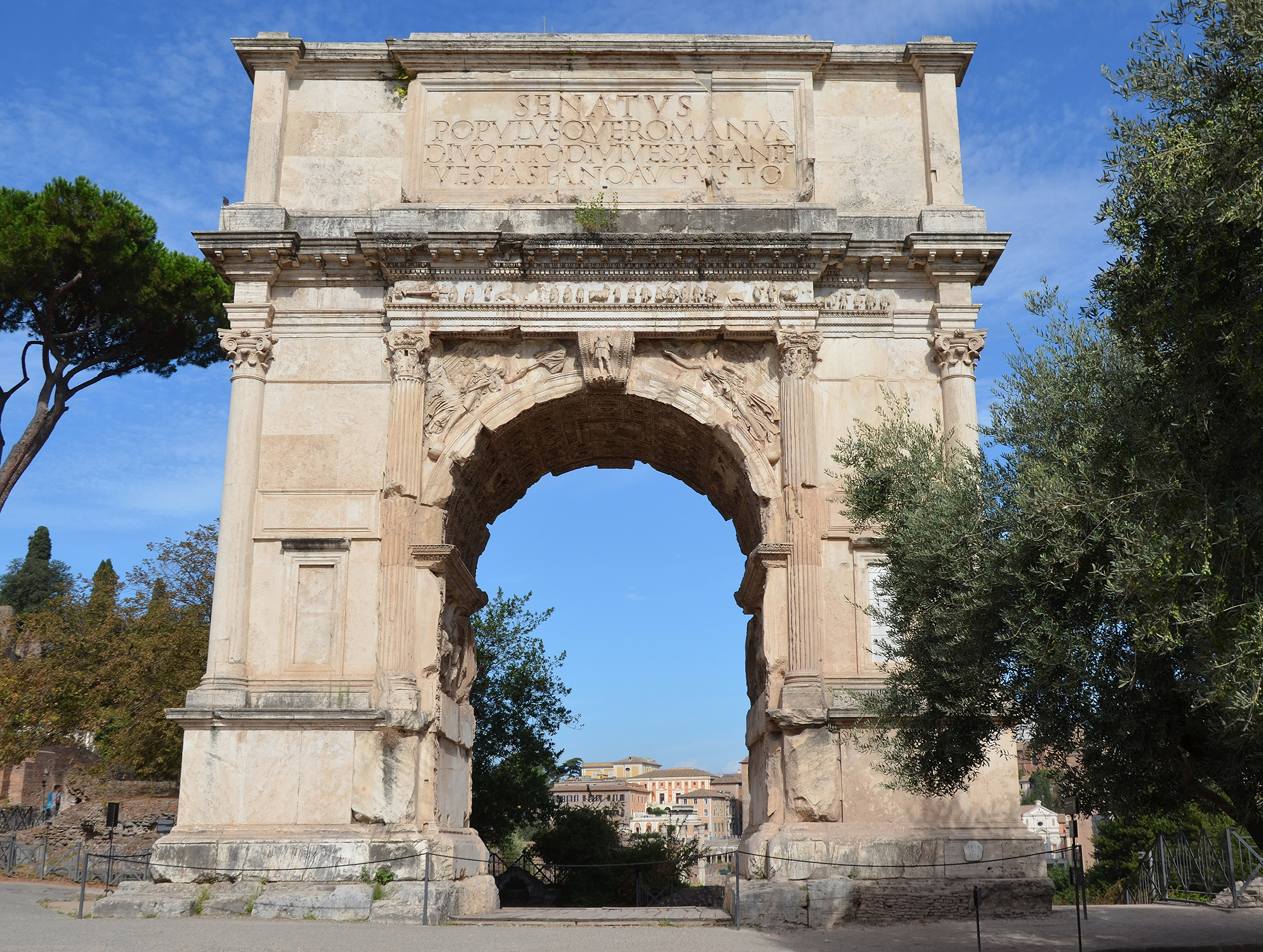
The Arch of Titus in Rome, an early Roman imperial triumphal arch with a single archway, built c. 81 AD by Emperor Domitian to commemorate his elder brother Titus's victory together with their father, Vespasian, over the Jewish rebellion in Judaea

=== Roman triumphal arches ===
Roman aqueducts, bridges, amphitheaters and domes employed arch principles and technology. The Romans probably borrowed the techniques of arch construction from their Etruscan neighbours. The Etruscans used elaborately decorated single bay arches as gates or portals to their cities; examples of Etruscan arches survive at Perugia and Volterra.

The two key elements of the Roman triumphal arch – a round-topped arch and a square entablature – had long been in use as separate architectural elements in ancient Greece, but the Greeks preferred the use of entablatures in their temples, and almost entirely confined their use of the arch to structures under external pressure, such as tombs and sewers. The Roman triumphal arch combined a round arch and a square entablature in a single free-standing structure. What were originally supporting columns became purely decorative elements on the outer face of arch, while the entablature, liberated from its role as a building support, became the frame for the civic and religious messages that the arch builders wished to convey through the use of statuary and symbolic, narrative and decorative elements.

The largest arches often had three archways, the central one significantly larger. The minority type of arch with passageways in both directions, often placed at crossroads, is called a tetrapylon (or arcus quadrifrons in Latin), as it has four piers. Roman examples are usually roughly cubical, like the Arch of Septimius Severus in Leptis Magna, Libya, but modern examples, like the Arc de Triomphe, tend to be oblong, with clear main faces and smaller side faces. Examples with three arches on the long face as well as arches at the ends, so with eight piers, are called octopylons. The Arc de Triomphe du Carrousel in Paris is an example.

The modern term triumphal arch derives from the notion that this form of architecture was connected to the award and commemoration of a triumph to particularly successful Roman generals, by vote of the Roman Senate. The earliest arches set up to commemorate a triumph were made in the time of the Roman Republic. These were called fornices (s. fornix) and bore imagery that described and commemorated the victory and triumph. Lucius Steritinus is known to have erected two such fornices in 196 BC to commemorate his victories in Hispania. Another fornix was built on the Capitoline Hill by Scipio Africanus in 190 BC, and Quintus Fabius Maximus Allobrogicus constructed one in the Roman Forum in 121 BC. None of these structures has survived and little is known about their appearance.

Roman triumphal practices changed significantly at the start of the imperial period when the princeps Augustus decreed that triumphs and triumphal honours were to be confined to members of the Imperial family; in practice, this meant the ruling emperor or his antecedents. The term fornix was replaced by arcus (arch). While Republican fornices could be erected by a triumphator at his own discretion and expense, Imperial triumphal arches were sponsored by decree of the senate, or sometimes by wealthy holders of high office, to honour and promote emperors, their office and the values of empire. Arches were not necessarily built as entrances, but – unlike many modern triumphal arches – they were often erected across roads and were intended to be passed through, not around.

Types of Roman triumphal arches

The Arch of Septimius Severus at Leptis Magna, Libya, a four-arched arcus quadrifrons, built c. 203 AD

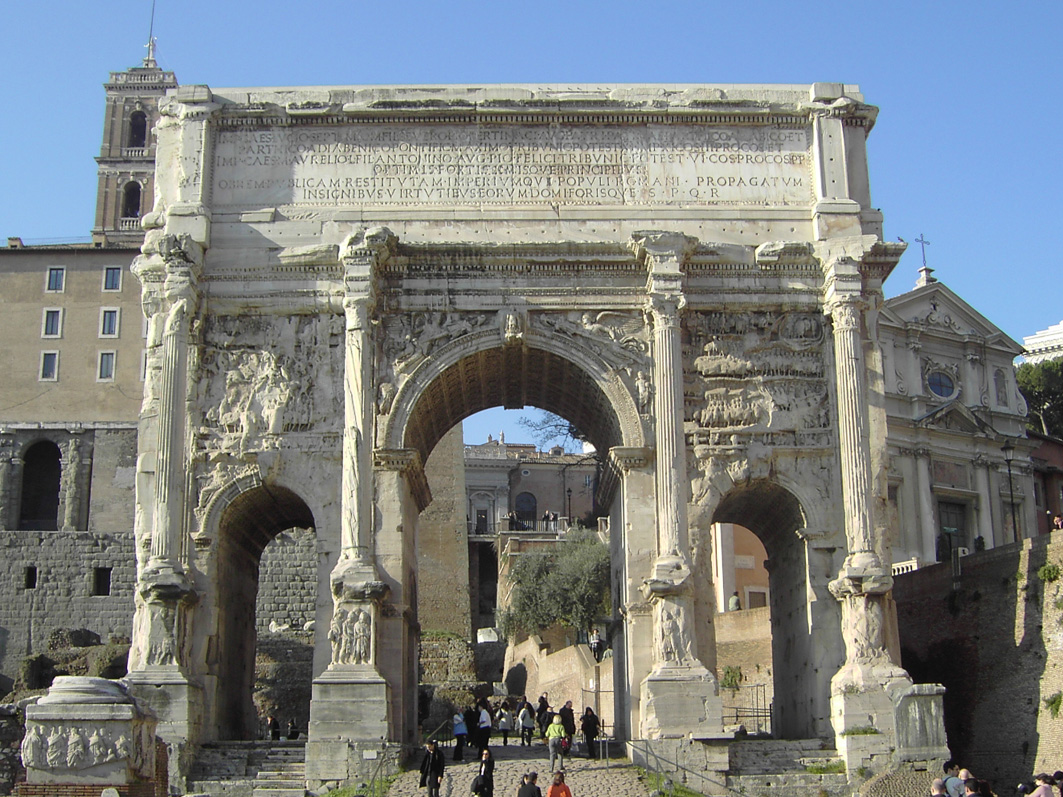
The Arch of Septimius Severus in Rome, built in 203–205 AD to commemorate the Parthian victories of Emperor Septimius Severus and his two sons, Caracalla and Geta

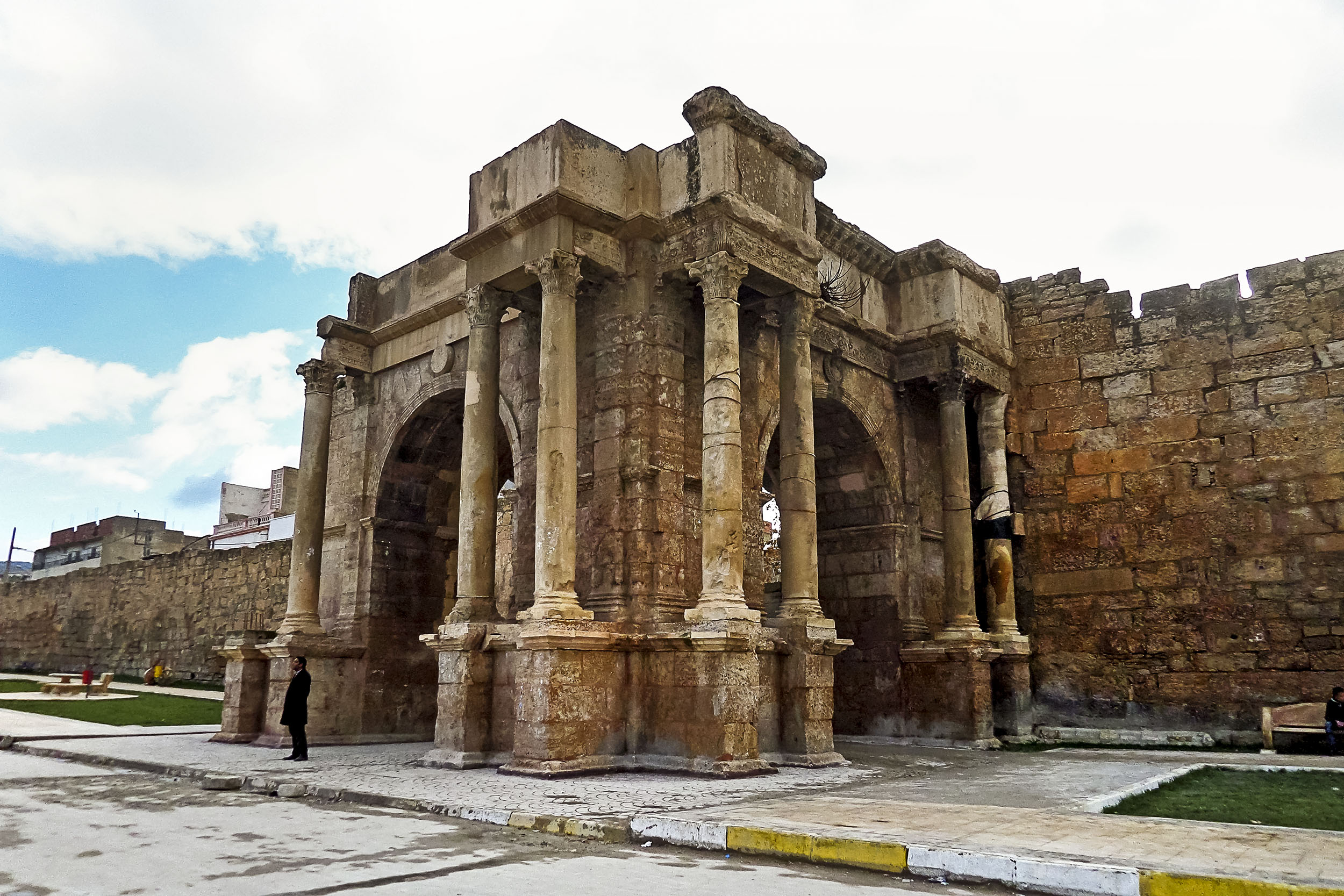
The Arch of Caracalla in Tebessa, Algeria, built c. 210 AD by a general from the city, dedicated to Emperor Caracalla

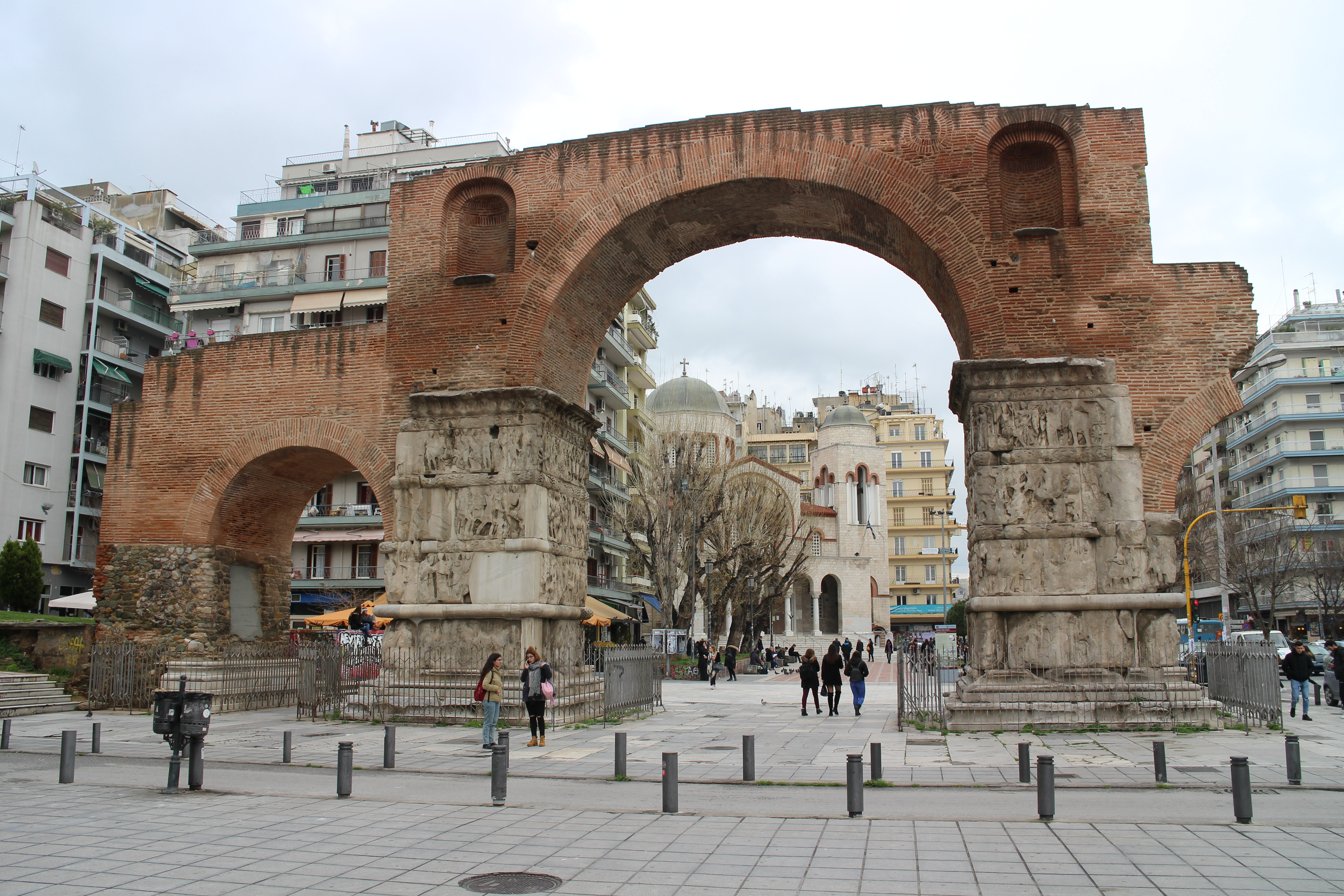
The Arch of Galerius in Thessaloniki, Greece, built in 298–299 AD and dedicated in 303 AD to celebrate the victory of the tetrarch Galerius over the Sassanid Persians and capture of their capital Ctesiphon in 298 AD

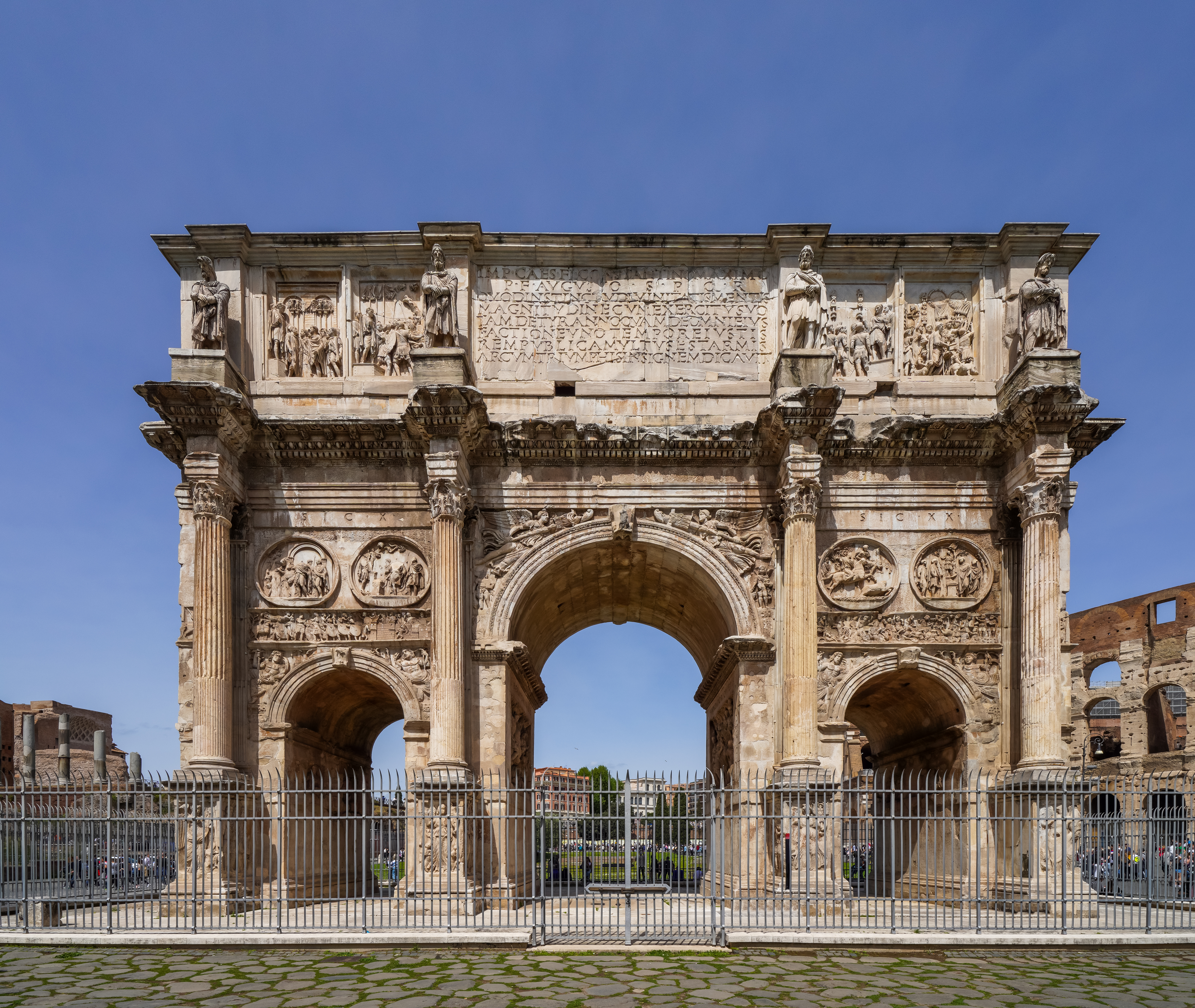
The Arch of Constantine in Rome, built in 312–315 AD to commemorate Emperor Constantine's victory over Maxentius at the Battle of Milvian Bridge in 312 AD

Most Roman triumphal arches were built during the Imperial period. By the fourth century AD there were 36 such arches in Rome, of which three have survived – the Arch of Titus (AD 81), the Arch of Septimius Severus (203–205) and the Arch of Constantine (315). Numerous arches were built elsewhere in the Roman Empire. The single arch was the most common, but many triple arches were also built, of which the Triumphal Arch of Orange (circa AD 21) is the earliest surviving example. From the 2nd century AD, many examples of the arcus quadrifrons – a square triumphal arch erected over a crossroads, with arched openings on all four sides – were built, especially in North Africa. Arch-building in Rome and Italy diminished after the time of Trajan (AD 98–117) but remained widespread in the provinces during the 2nd and 3rd centuries AD; they were often erected to commemorate imperial visits.

Little is known about how the Romans viewed triumphal arches. Pliny the Elder, writing in the first century AD, was the only ancient author to discuss them. He wrote that they were intended to "elevate above the ordinary world" an image of an honoured person usually depicted in the form of a statue with a quadriga. However, the designs of Roman imperial triumphal arches – which became increasingly elaborate over time and evolved a regularised set of features – were clearly intended to convey a number of messages to the spectator.

The ornamentation of an arch was intended to serve as a constant visual reminder of the triumph and triumphator. As such, it concentrated on factual imagery rather than allegory. The façade was ornamented with marble columns, and the piers and attics with decorative cornices. Sculpted panels depicted victories and achievements, the deeds of the triumphator, the captured weapons of the enemy or the triumphal procession itself. The spandrels usually depicted flying Victories, while the attic was often inscribed with a dedicatory inscription naming and praising the triumphator. The piers and internal passageways were also decorated with reliefs and free-standing sculptures. The vault was ornamented with coffers. Some triumphal arches were surmounted by a statue or a currus triumphalis, a group of statues depicting the emperor or general in a quadriga. The inscriptions on Roman triumphal arches were works of art in themselves, with very finely cut, sometimes gilded letters. The form of each letter and the spacing between them was carefully designed for maximum clarity and simplicity, without any decorative flourishes, emphasizing the Roman taste for restraint and order. This conception of what later became the art of typography remains of fundamental importance down to the present day.

Ornamentation on Roman triumphal arches

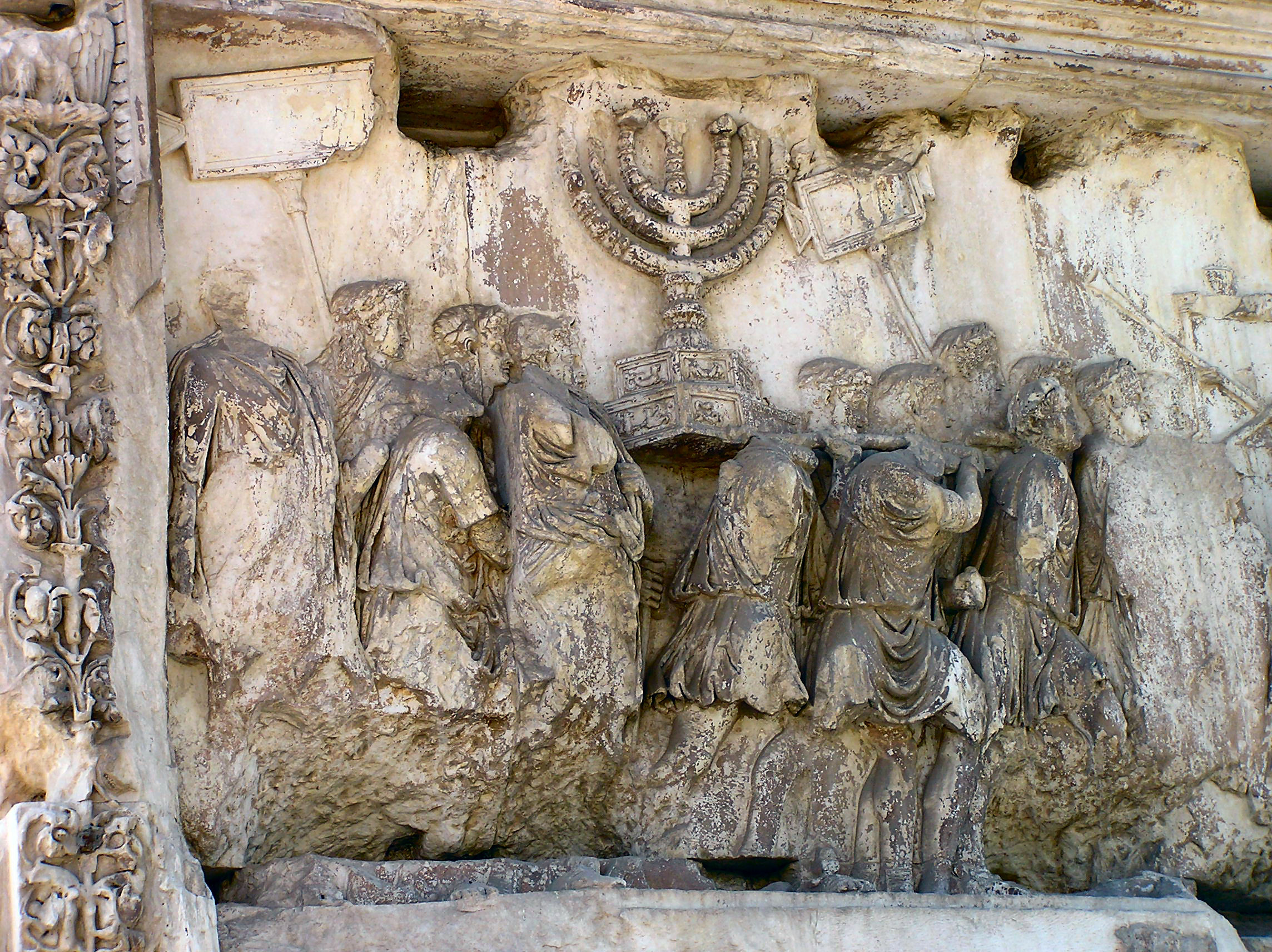
Titus' triumphal procession depicted on the Arch of Titus, showing the loot captured from Jerusalem in 81 AD

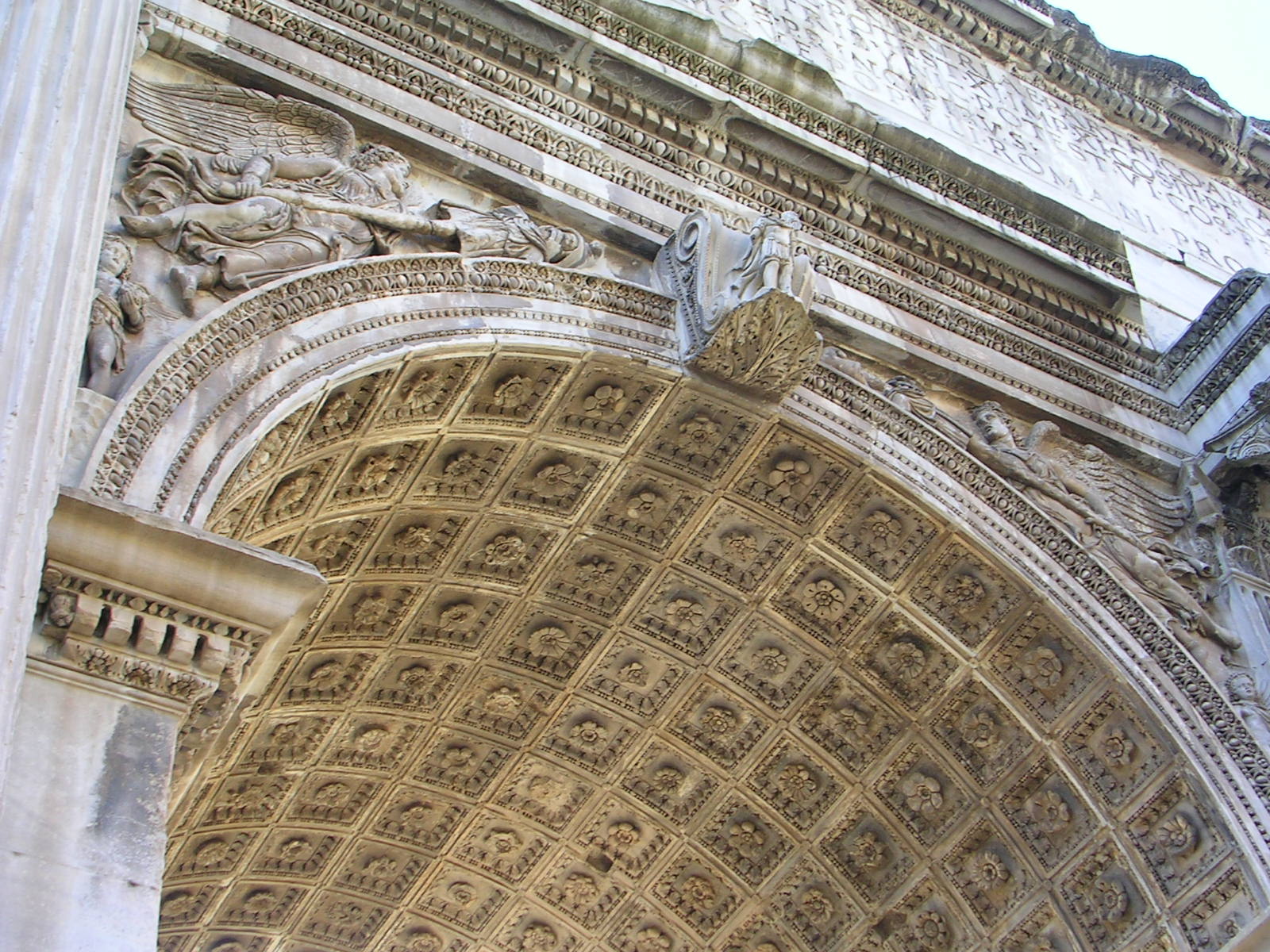
The elaborate carvings and coffered vault of the Arch of Septimius Severus in Rome

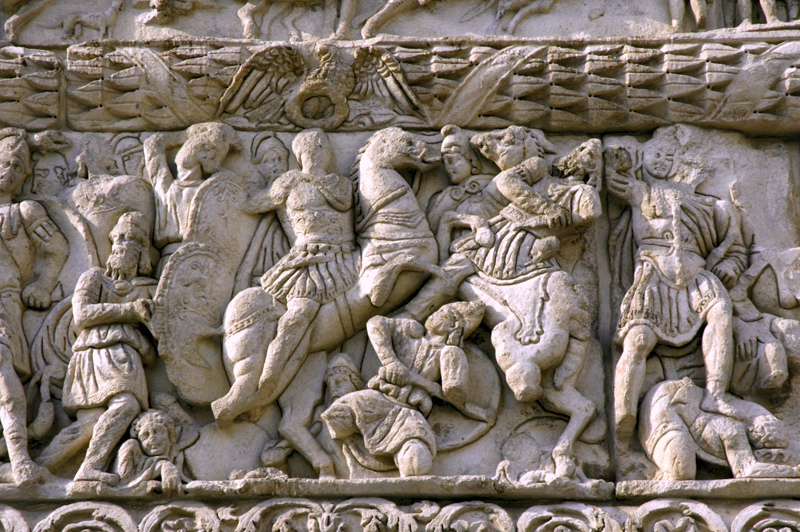
Galerius (L) attacks Narses (R). Arch of Galerius.

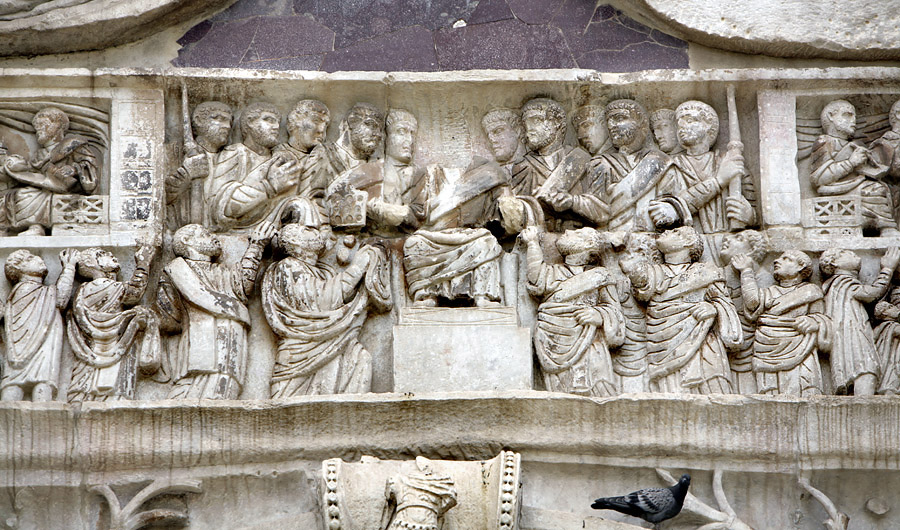
Frieze on the Arch of Constantine, in Rome, depicting Constantine I distributing gifts to the people

=== Post-Roman triumphal arches ===
Lorsch Abbey, the 9th-century Torhalle (gatehouse)

Roman triumphal arches remained a source of fascination well after the fall of Rome, serving as a reminder of past glories and a symbol of state power, that was especially appealing to Holy Roman Emperors. At Lorsch Abbey, the triple-arched Torhalle was built in deliberate imitation of a Roman triumphal arch to signify continuity between the Carolingian Empire and its Roman predecessor. In the now dismantled City Gate of Capua of the 1230s, the Emperor Frederick II attempted a triumphal arch in the idiom of Romanesque architecture. It was not until the coming of the Renaissance, however, that rulers sought to associate themselves systematically with the Roman legacy by building their own triumphal arches.

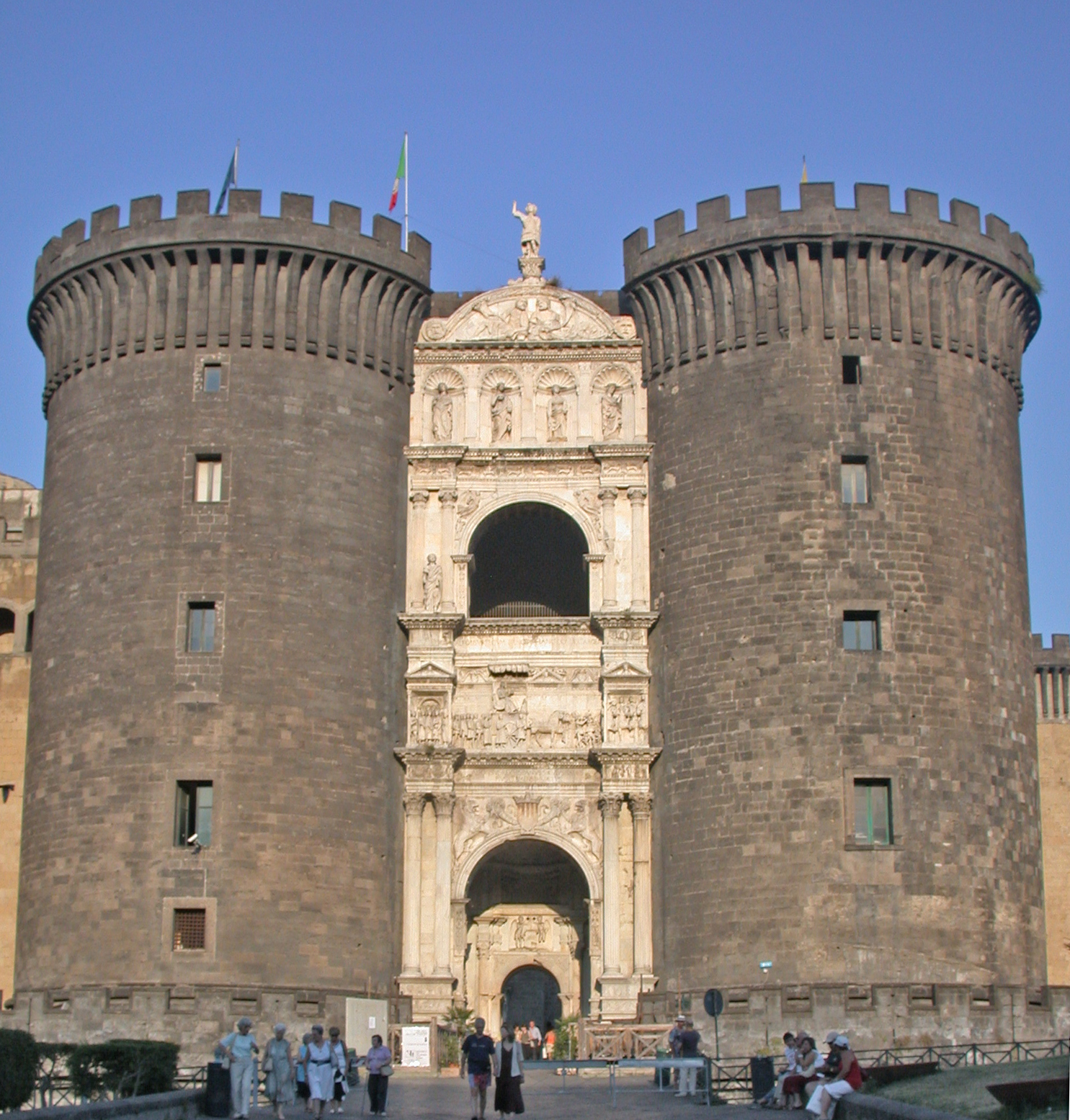
Arco di Trionfo di Castel Nuovo in Naples, a Renaissance triumphal arch integrated into a gatehouse, built to commemorate Alfonso of Aragon's victorious entry into Naples

Probably the earliest large recreation was the "Aragonese Arch" at the Castel Nuovo in Naples, erected by Alfonso V of Aragon in 1470, supposedly to commemorate his taking over the kingdom in 1443, although like the later Porta Capuana this was a new façade for the gateway to the castle. By the end of the 16th century the triumphal arch had become closely linked with court theatre, state pageantry and military fortifications. The motif of the triumphal arch was also adapted and incorporated into the façades of public buildings such as city halls and churches.

Temporary triumphal arches made of lath and plaster were often erected for royal entries. Unlike the individual arches erected for Roman conquerors, Renaissance rulers often built a row of arches through which processions were staged. They defined a space for the movement of people and denoted significant sites at which particular messages were conveyed at each stage. Newly elected popes, for instance, processed through the streets of Rome under temporary triumphal arches built specially for the occasion. Arches were also built for dynastic weddings; when Duke Charles Emmanuel I of Savoy married Infanta Catalina Micaela of Spain in 1585, he processed under temporary triumphal arches that asserted the antiquity of the House of Savoy and associated his dynasty, through the art and architecture of the arches, with the imperial Roman past.

Temporary wooden triumphal arches were also built in Malta for ceremonies in which a newly elected Hospitaller Grand Master took possession of Mdina and sometimes Birgu.

Images of arches gained great importance as well. Although temporary arches were torn down after they had been used, they were recorded in great detail in engravings that were widely distributed and survived long after the original arches had been destroyed. The medium of engraving gave the viewer the opportunity to examine the allegories and inscriptions presented by the arches in a way that would not have been possible during the event. Sometimes the arches depicted were not even real structures but existed entirely as imaginary representations of royal propaganda. One famous example was the Ehrenpforte Maximilians I by Albrecht Dürer, commissioned by the Emperor Maximilian I. It was one of the largest prints ever produced, measuring 3.75 metres (12.3 ft) high and consisting of 192 individual sheets, depicting an arch that was never intended to be built. It was printed in an edition of 700 copies and distributed to be coloured and pasted on the walls of city halls or the palaces of princes.

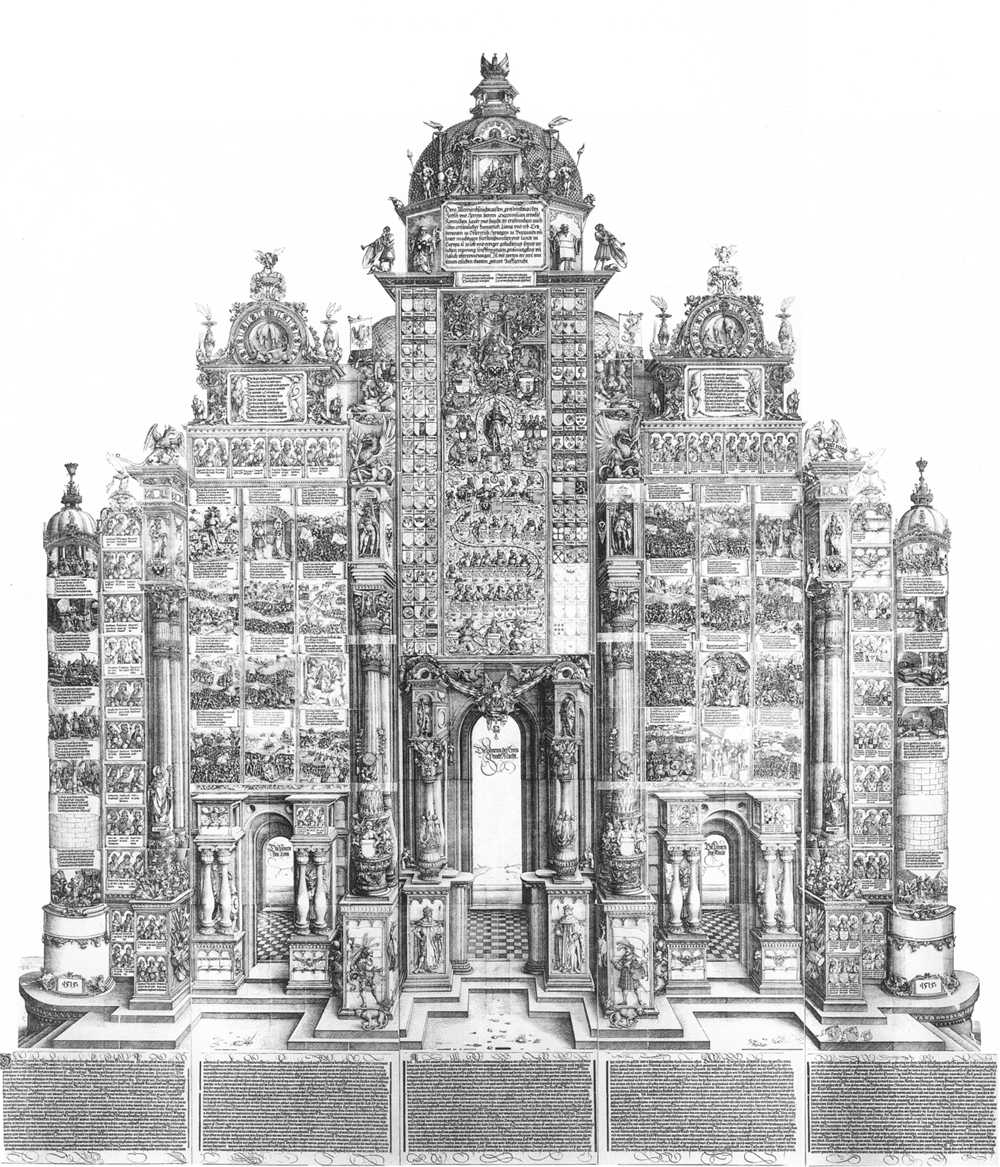
Ehrenpforte Maximilians I, woodcut. Albrecht Dürer, 1515; purely a paper arch, never meant to be built

The French led the way in building new permanent triumphal arches when the imperial ambitions of the Bourbon kings and Napoleon Bonaparte led to a spate of arch-building. By far the most famous arch from this period is the Arc de Triomphe in Paris, built from 1806 to 1836, though it is consciously dissimilar from its Roman predecessors in omitting the customary ornamental columns – a lack that fundamentally changes the balance of the arch and gives it a distinctly "top-heavy" look. Other French arches more closely imitated those of imperial Rome; the Arc de Triomphe du Carrousel in Paris, for instance, is a tetrapylon closely modelled on the Arch of Septimius Severus in Rome.

Triumphal arches have continued to be built into the modern era, often as statements of power and self-aggrandizement by dictators. Adolf Hitler planned to build the world's largest triumphal arch in Berlin. The arch would have been vastly larger than any previously built, standing 550 feet (170 m) wide, 92 feet (28 m) deep and 392 feet (119 m) high – big enough for the Arc de Triomphe to fit into it 49 times. It was intended to be carved with the names of Germany's 1.8 million dead in the First World War. However, construction was never begun. North Korea's dictator Kim Il Sung built the world's largest triumphal arch in Pyongyang in 1982. It was designed to be substantially bigger than the Arc de Triomphe in Paris and was erected on the site where, on October 14, 1945, Kim Il Sung gave his first public speech to the North Korean people. It is decorated with sculptures and reliefs depicting "the triumphal returning of the victorious Great Leader to the country".

The form of the triumphal arch has also been put to other purposes, notably the construction of monumental memorial arches and city gates such as the Brandenburg Gate in Berlin, the Washington Square Arch in New York City, or the India Gate in New Delhi, or simple welcoming arches such as Barcelona's Arc de Triomf, built as an entrance to the fairgrounds for the 1888 World Fair. Although patterned after triumphal arches, these were built for quite different purposes – to memorialise war casualties, to commemorate a civil event (the country's independence, for example), or to provide a monumental entrance to a city, as opposed to celebrating a military success or general.

Post-Roman triumphal arches

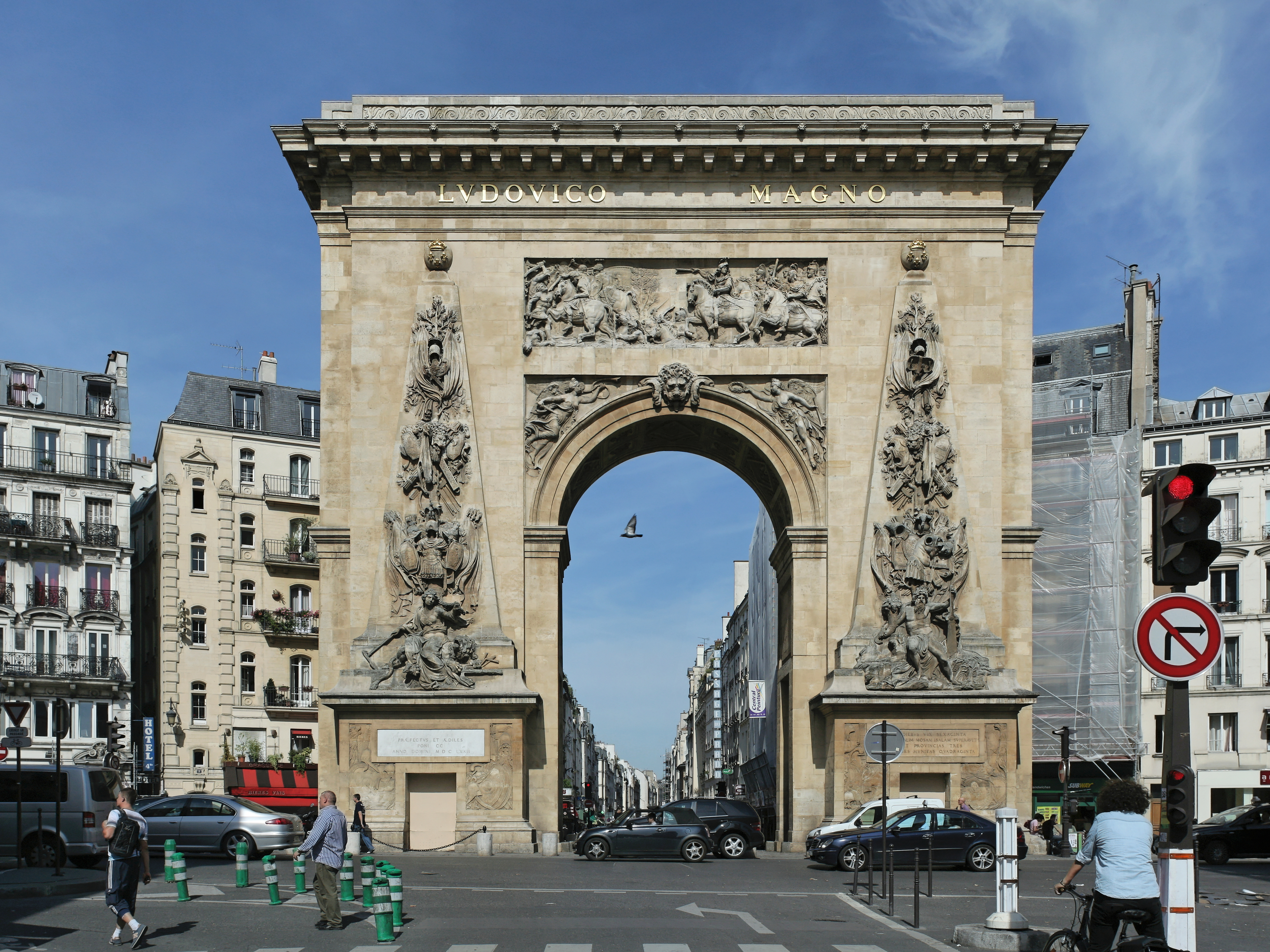
The Porte Saint-Denis in Paris, built in 1672 to commemorate the victories of Louis XIV

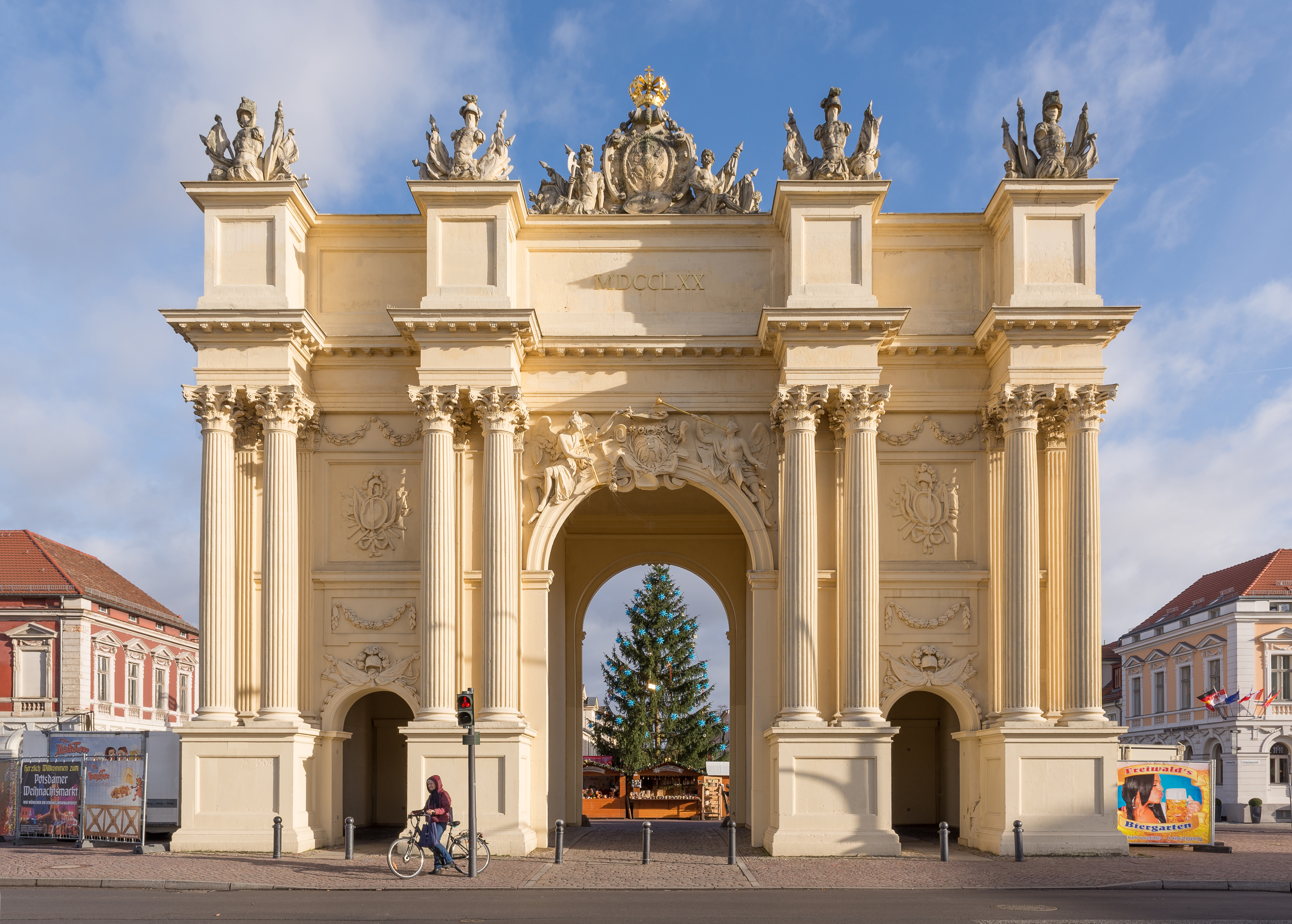
The Brandenburg Gate in Potsdam, built in 1770–71 to commemorate Frederick the Great's victory in the Seven Years' War

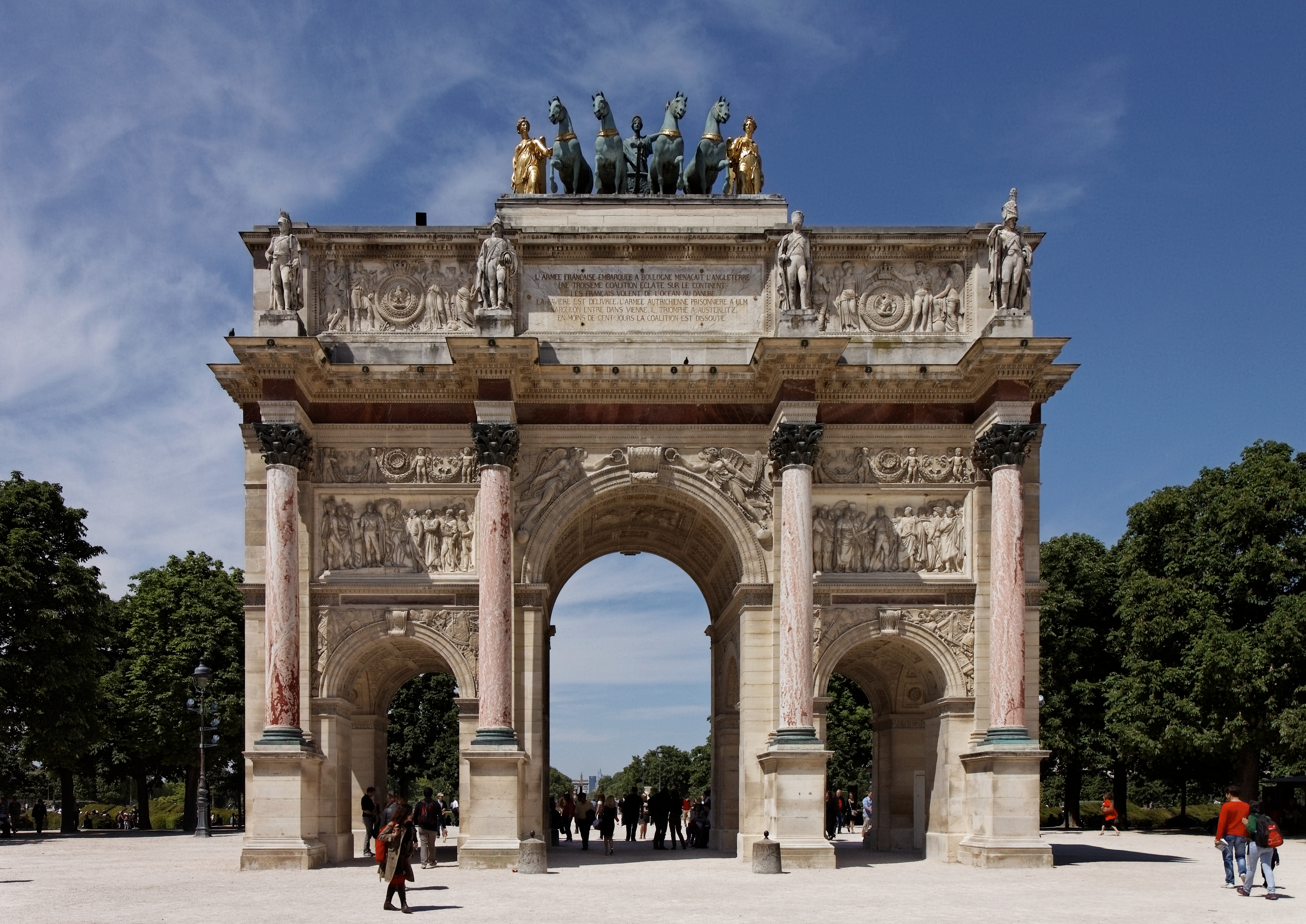
The Arc de Triomphe du Carrousel in Paris, built in 1806–1808 to commemorate Napoleon's victories

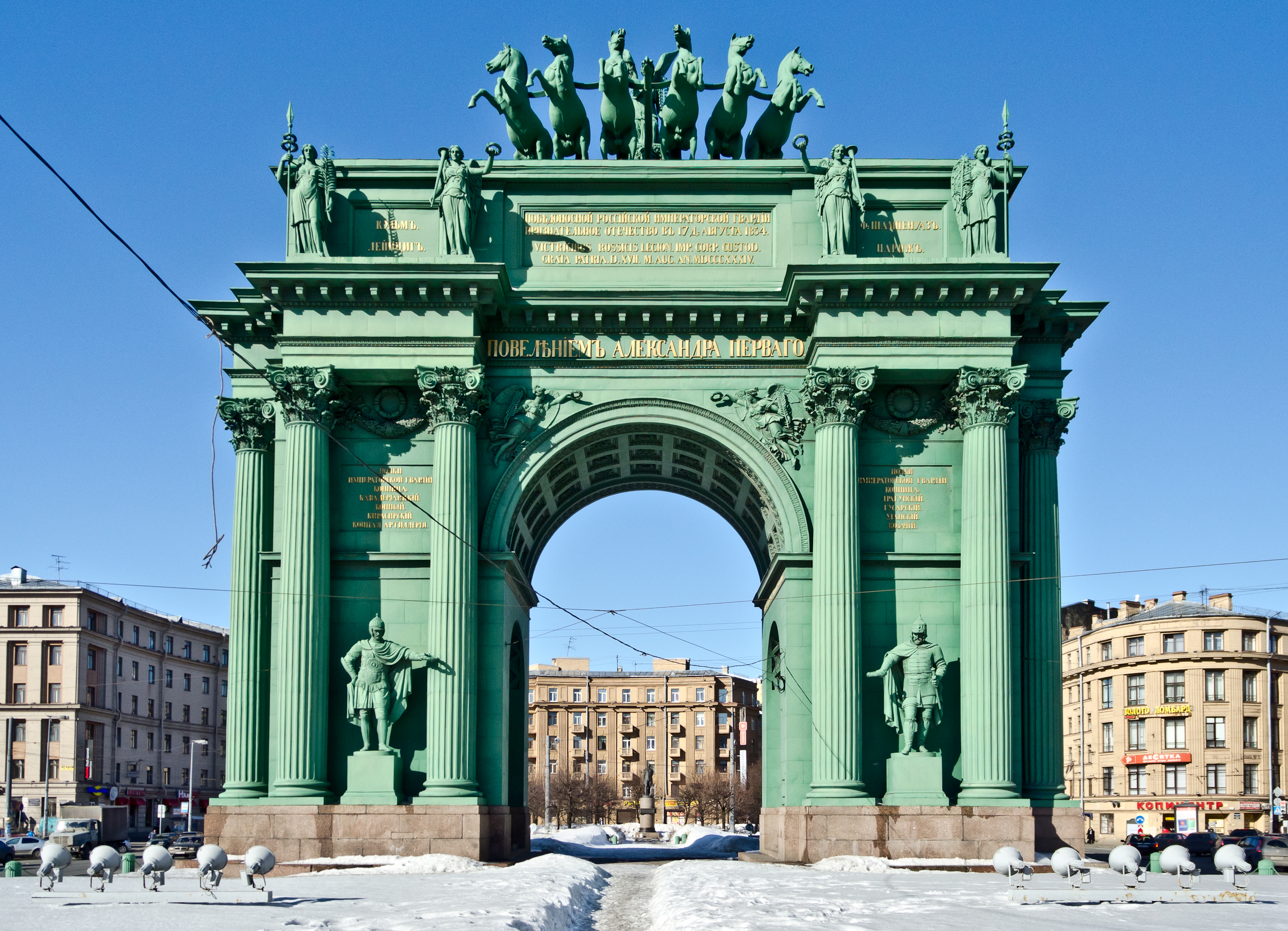
The Narva Triumphal Arch in Saint Petersburg by Giacomo Quarenghi, built in 1814 to commemorate Russia's victory over Napoleon

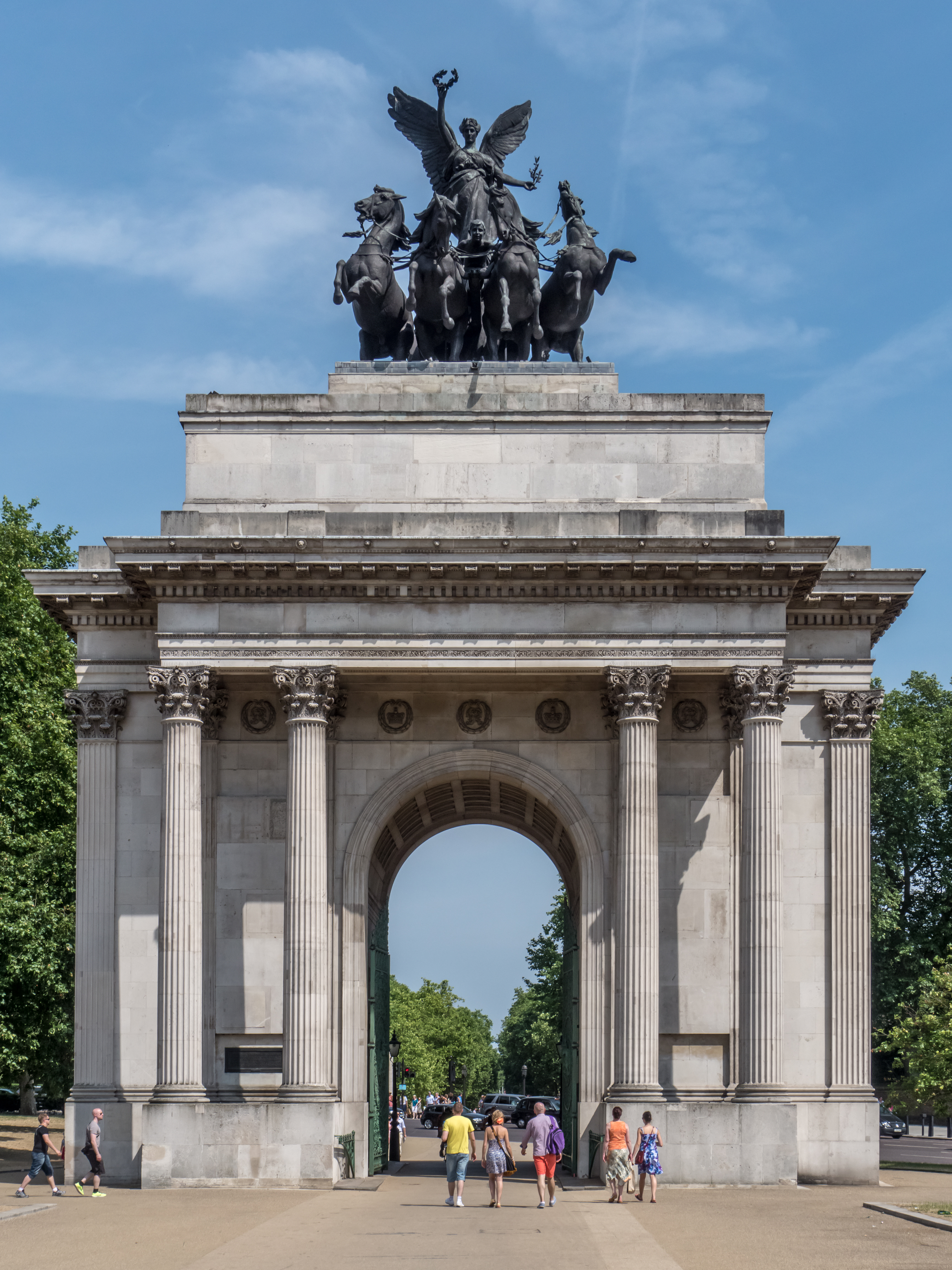
The Wellington Arch in London, built in 1826–1830 to commemorate Britain's victories in the Napoleonic Wars

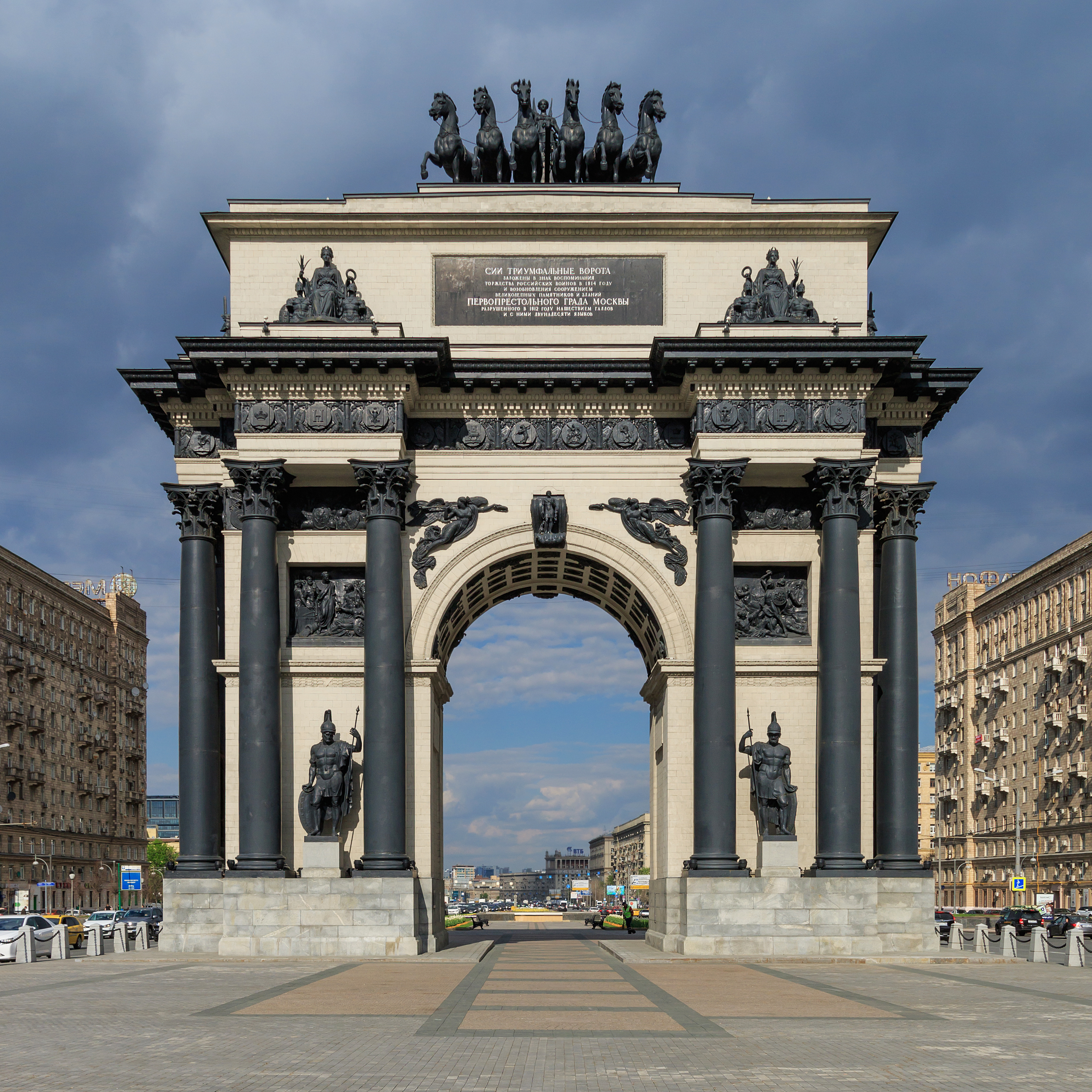
The Triumphal Arch in Moscow, built in 1829–1834 to commemorate Russia's victory over Napoleon during the French invasion of Russia in 1812

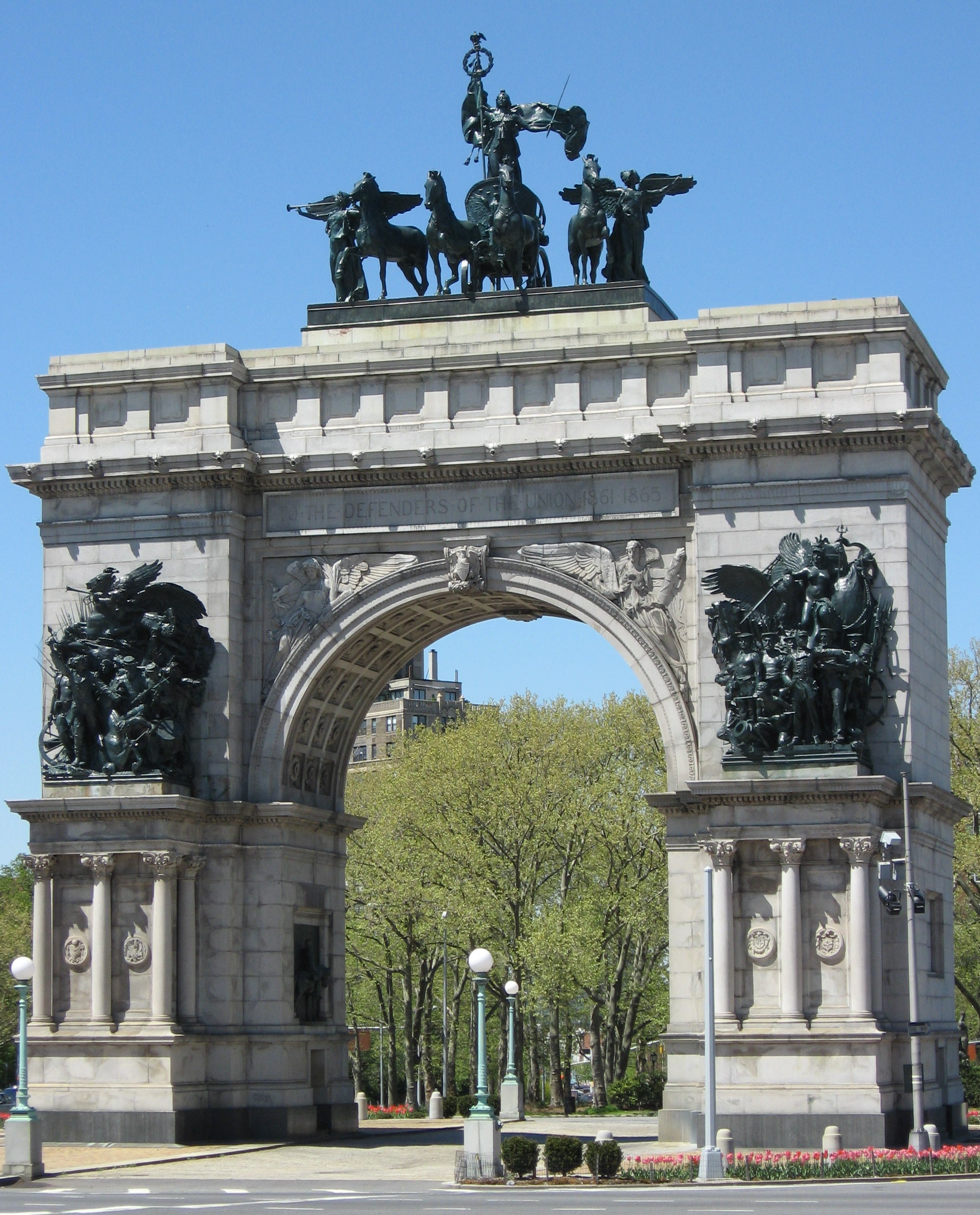
The Soldiers' and Sailors' Arch in New York City, built in 1889–1892 to commemorate the United States' victory over the Confederate Rebellion

The Arcul de Triumf in Bucharest, built in 1922 to celebrate the victory in WWI and the coronation of King Ferdinand and his wife Marie

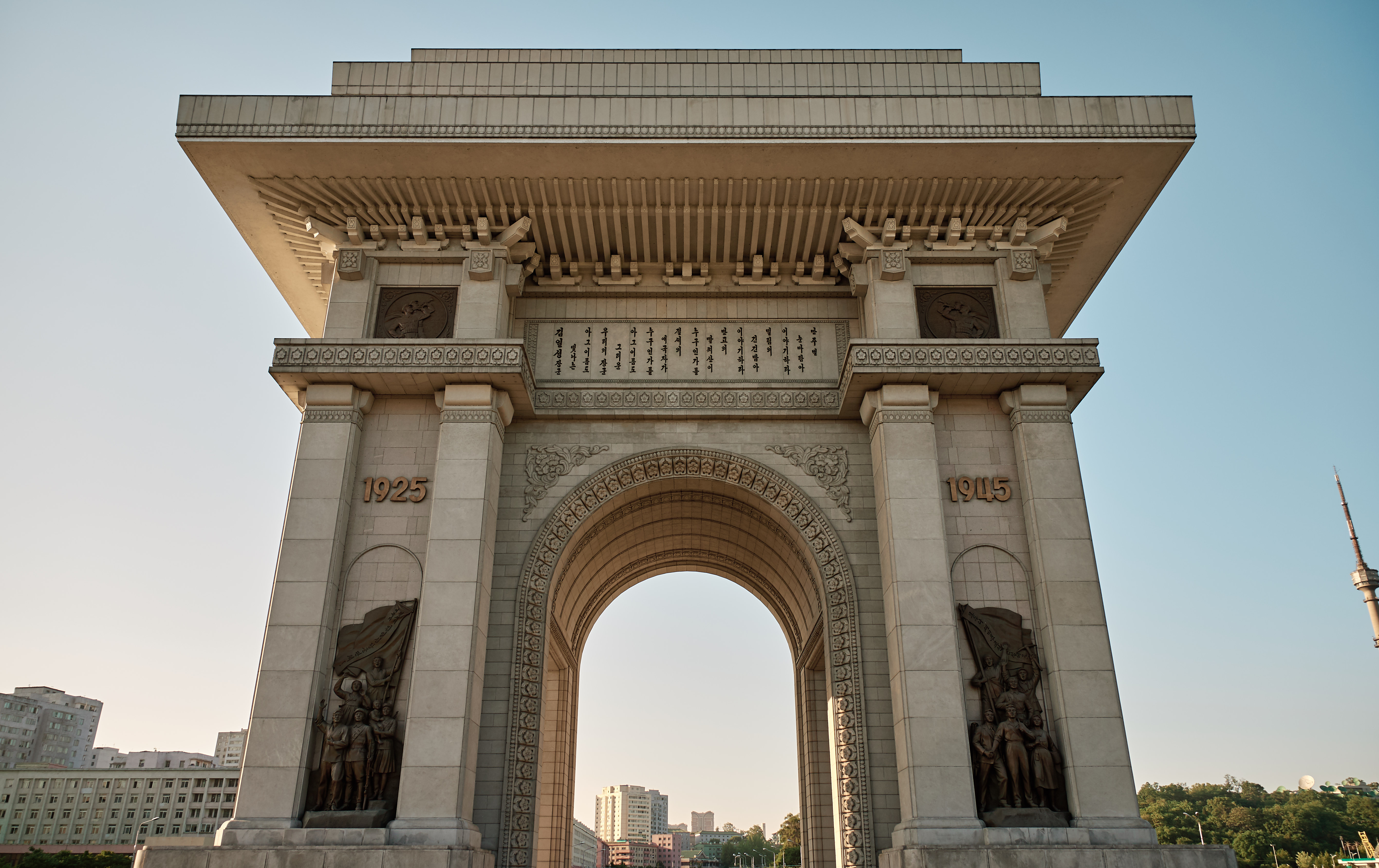
The Arch of Triumph in Pyongyang, the second tallest triumphal arch in the world, built in 1982 to commemorate the Korean resistance to Japan from 1925 to 1945

== See also ==
- Gate tower
- Stele
- Paifang
