= State Archives of Caserta =

State archival institution in Caserta, Italy

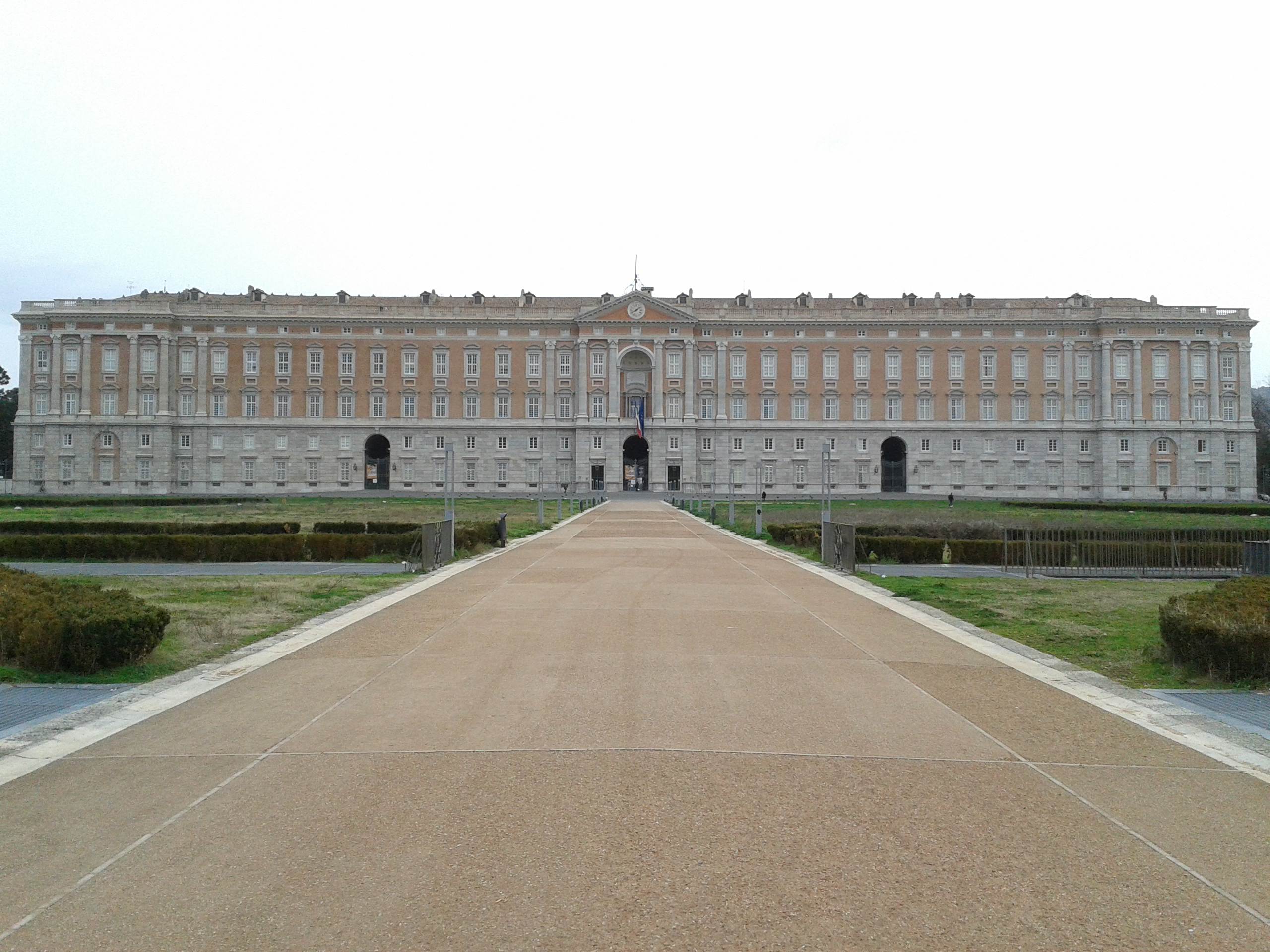
- Interactive map of State Archives of Caserta
- 41°04′21″N 14°19′40″E
- Location: Caserta, Campania, Italy
- Type: State archive

Building information
- Building: Royal Palace of Caserta
- Website: http://www.ascaserta.beniculturali.it/

The State Archives of Caserta (Italian: Archivio di Stato di Caserta) is the state archival institution in Caserta, Campania, Italy. It preserves historical records produced by public offices and institutions in the province of Caserta as part of the national archival network administered by the Ministry of Culture. Since 2018 the archives have been housed in the Royal Palace of Caserta.

== History ==
The institution was established on 22 October 1812 as the Provincial Archive of Terra di Lavoro. In 1869, it was merged with the supplementary archive of Santa Maria Capua Vetere. In 1927, it became a Section of the State Archives of Naples, before gaining its autonomy as State Archives on 30 September 1963.

The first seat of the archives was in Capua, in Palazzo San Cipriano, now home to the Museo Campano. Over time the institution moved to several different locations, before being definitively transferred in 2018 to the Royal Palace of Caserta.

== Sources ==
- "Archivio di Stato di Caserta" (PDF). Guida generale degli Archivi di Stato italiani. Vol. I. Rome: Ministero per i beni culturali e ambientali. 1981. pp. 803–824.
- "Archivio di Stato di Caserta". Sistema informativo degli Archivi di Stato (in Italian). Istituto centrale per gli archivi.
