= Museo Campano =

Museum in Capua, Italy

- Museo Provinciale Campano di Capua
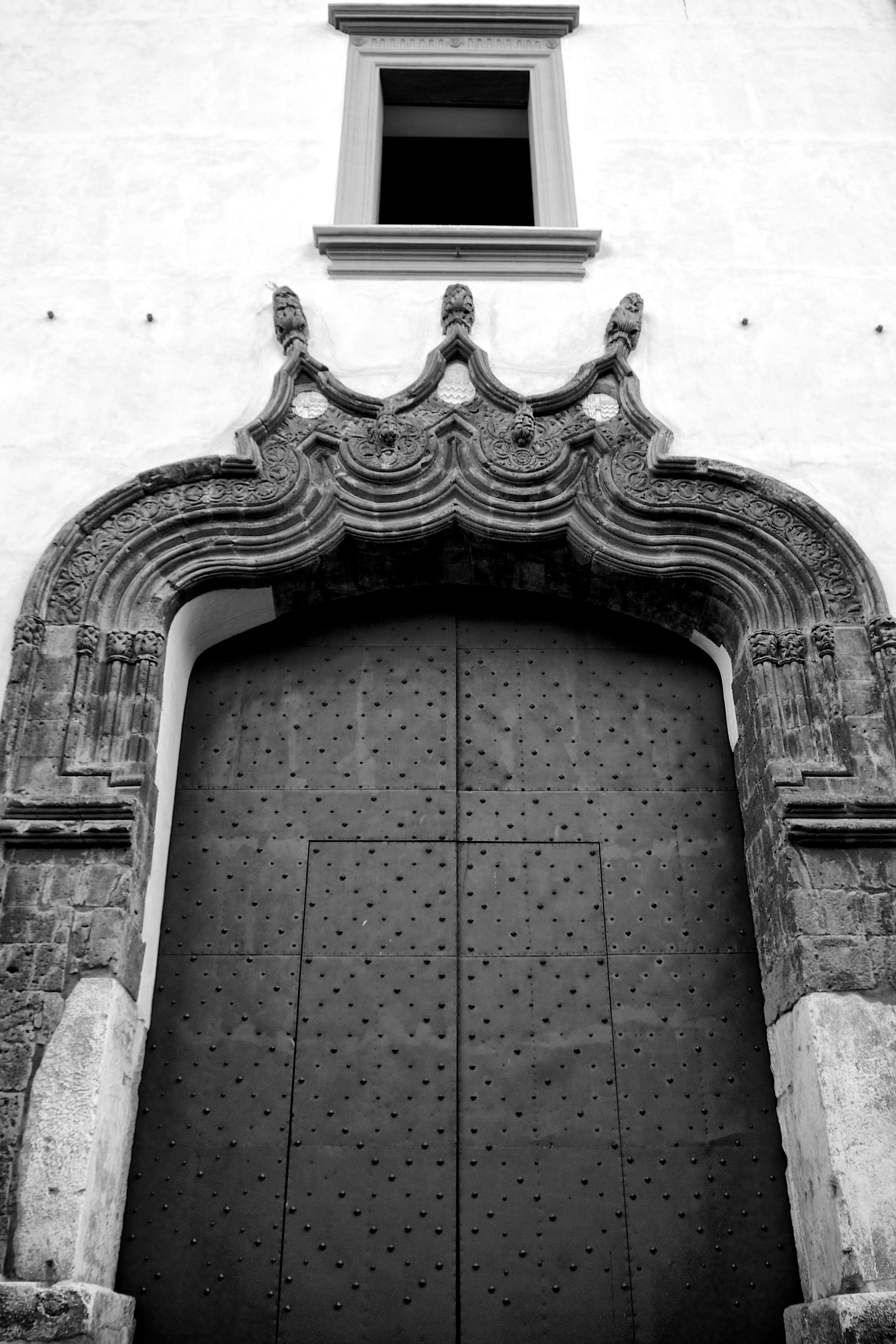
- Main entrance of Palazzo Antignano
- Established: 1870
- Location: Via Roma, 68, Capua, Italy
- Coordinates: 41°06′39.12″N 14°12′47.49″E

The Museo Provinciale Campano di Capua (commonly referred to as Museo Campano) is a provincial museum located in Capua, southern Italy. Established in 1870 and inaugurated in 1874, it is housed in the historic Palazzo Antignano. The museum is dedicated to ancient Italian civilization in Campania, and is home to an extensive collection of ritual statues representing matres matutae coming from the ancient Roman site of Capua antica. It also hosts the second largest lapidarium in the region, after that of the National Archaeological Museum of Naples.

== History ==
On August 21, 1869, a "Committee for the conservation of monuments and objects of antiquity and fine arts" founded by father Gabriele Iannelli was established by royal decree in what was then the region of Terra di Lavoro. The committee approved the establishment of a museum of antiquities in Capua, which was officially founded in 1870. The historic Palazzo Antignano (whose Lombard origins date back to the IX century, but which was heavily altered in the mid-XV century) was chosen as the seat of the new museum, which opened to the public in 1874.

The museum was established for the purpose of properly preserving and displaying the large quantity of precious archaeological material that had been discovered in the region, especially thanks to the excavations conducted on the many nearby archaeological sites. The museum continued growing over time, and in 1933 the building was rearranged to adapt to the ever-expanding collections.

On September 9, 1943, an Allied air strike hit Capua, killing about a thousand people and destroying circa 75% of the buildings in the city, including Palazzo Antignano. Some important pieces of the collections were destroyed. Rebuilding of Palazzo Antignano started in 1945, and in 1956 the museum was reopened.

== Palazzo Antignano ==
The palace was the home of the prominent Antignano family, which gained prominence under the rule of Alfonso V of Aragon. In its present form the palace dates back to the XV century, but incorporates much older spolia such as Longobard capitals and columns, as well as the remnants of the Longobard church of San Lorenzo ad Crucem, deconsecrated in 1594.

The façade features a Catalan Gothic portal and Renaissance elements; inside, the main courtyard boasts a monumental open staircase.

== Collections ==
Included in the collections housed on site are terracotta sculptures and adornments from the Mater Matuta temple near Capua recovered from the Fondo Paturelli estate.

The largest collection is that of the Mater Matuta statues; totaling over 160.

The collection includes the body of the 13th-century statue of Frederick II, Holy Roman Emperor once on the City Gate of Capua, an important monument. The head is now in Berlin.
