= City Gate of Capua =

Historical fortified gate, 1230s–1557

Coordinates: 41°06′36″N 14°12′31″E

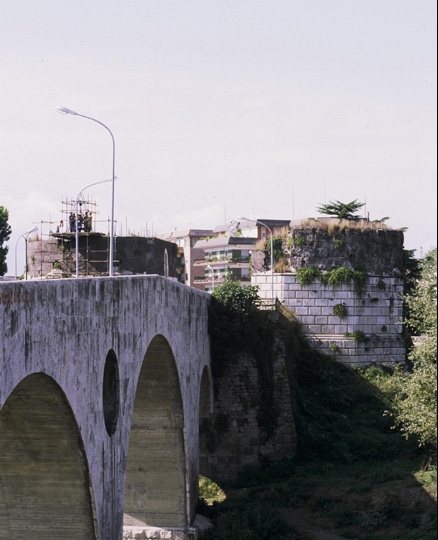
The bases of the two towers and the reconstructed Roman bridge

The City Gate of Capua (Italian: Porta di Capua or Porta delle due Torri, 'Gate of the Two Towers') was a monumental fortified gate constructed between 1234 and 1239 at Capua, on the road between Naples and Rome, on the orders of Frederick II, Holy Roman Emperor.

While it survived, the gate was famous, and is often thought to have been influential on other constructions and sculptures of the period, especially in respect of the large statue of the seated emperor himself, which mostly survives in different museums.

The gate was destroyed in 1557 on the orders of Fernando Álvarez de Toledo, the viceroy of Naples. Much of the sculpture is preserved today in the Museo Campano in Capua, but the sculpture of Frederick was severely damaged when French troops marched south to support the Parthenopean Republic in 1799. The head is now in the Bode Museum in Berlin, and most of the body in the Museo Campano.

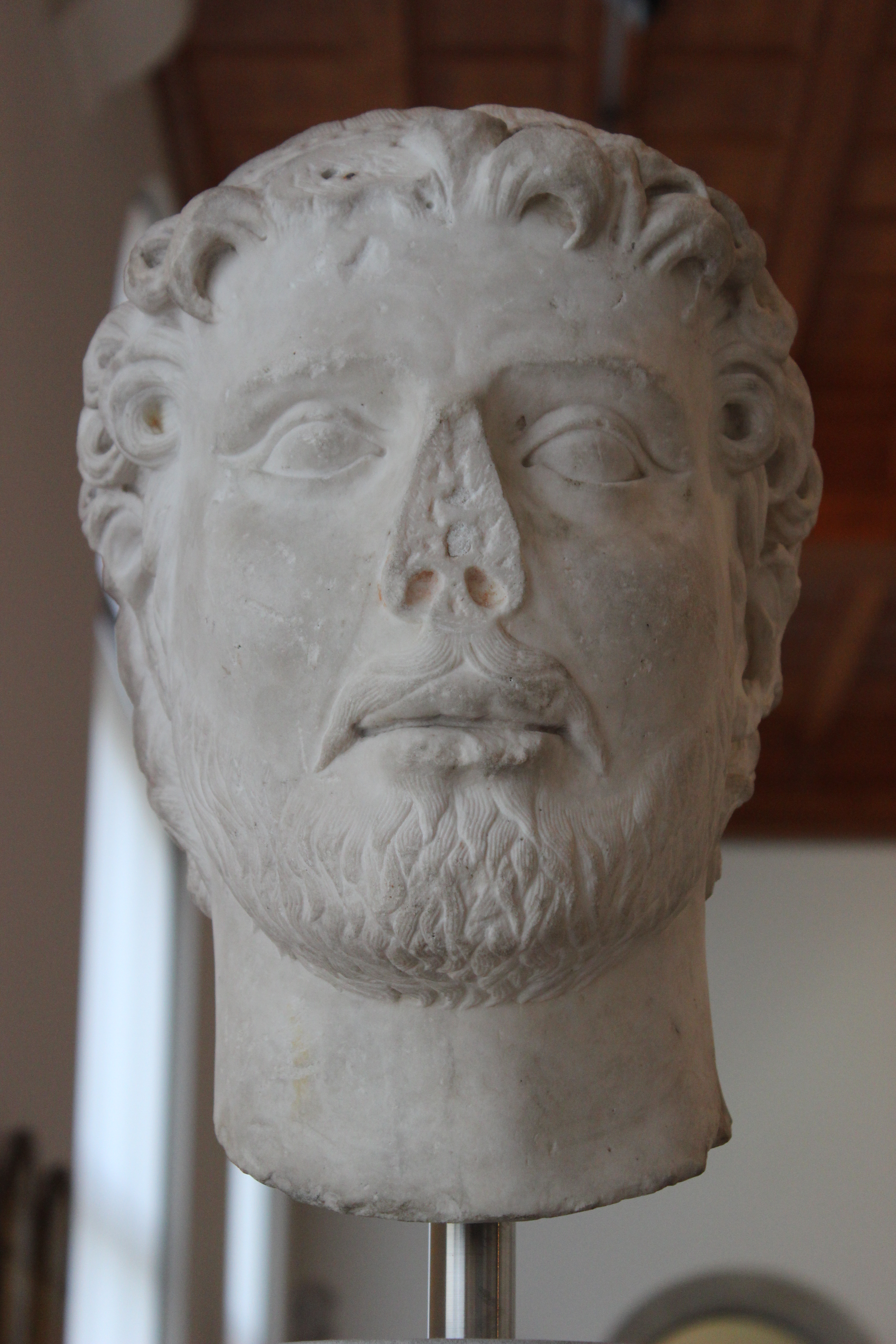
Sculpted head of a man from southern Italy, now in Berlin. The head of Frederick II, Holy Roman Emperor would have appeared similar.

== Description and context ==
The gateway itself was a Romanesque arch in a façade between two large towers. The façade was programmatically decorated with sculptures to glorify the emperor, including one of Frederick himself.

Medieval Capua was built on the site of ancient Casilinum (while ancient Capua is today Santa Maria Capua Vetere). A Roman bridge known as the Ponte Casilino crossed the Volturno from the north. Frederick II had a new gate built on the north side of the Volturno before the bridge. The gate was built to greet travellers coming from the Papal States.

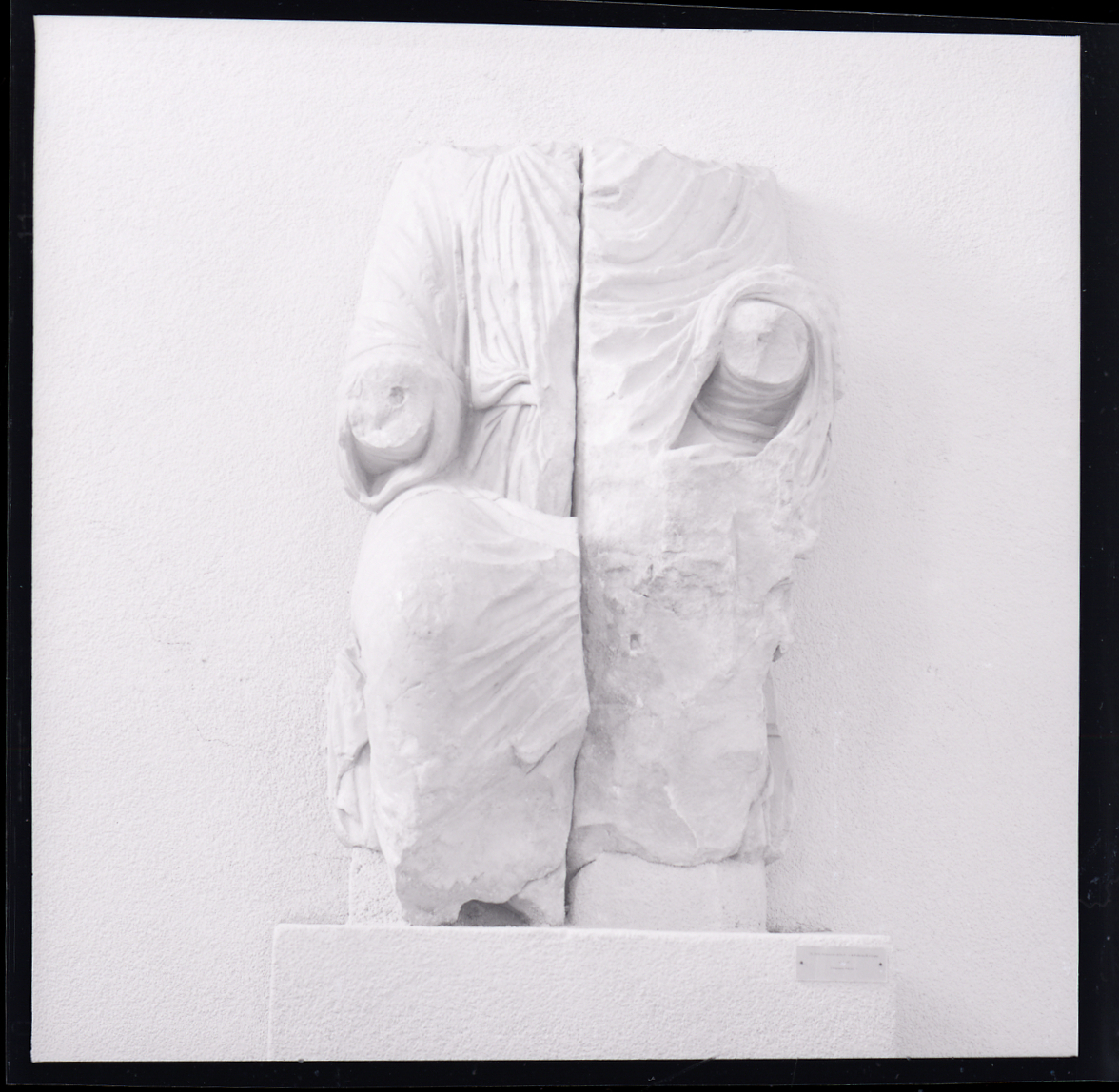
Body of Frederick, now in Museo Campano, Capua

== Bibliography ==
- Bredekamp, Horst (2021) [2010]. Image Acts: A Systematic Approach to Visual Agency. Translated by Elizabeth Clegg. De Gruyter. doi:10.1515/9783110725827. ISBN 9783110725827. S2CID 240801925.
- D'Onofrio, Mario (2005). "Capua, Porta di". Federiciana: Enciclopedia fridericiana. Istituto dell'Enciclopedia Italiana.
