= Severan art =

Art production by the Roman Empire under the Severan dynasty

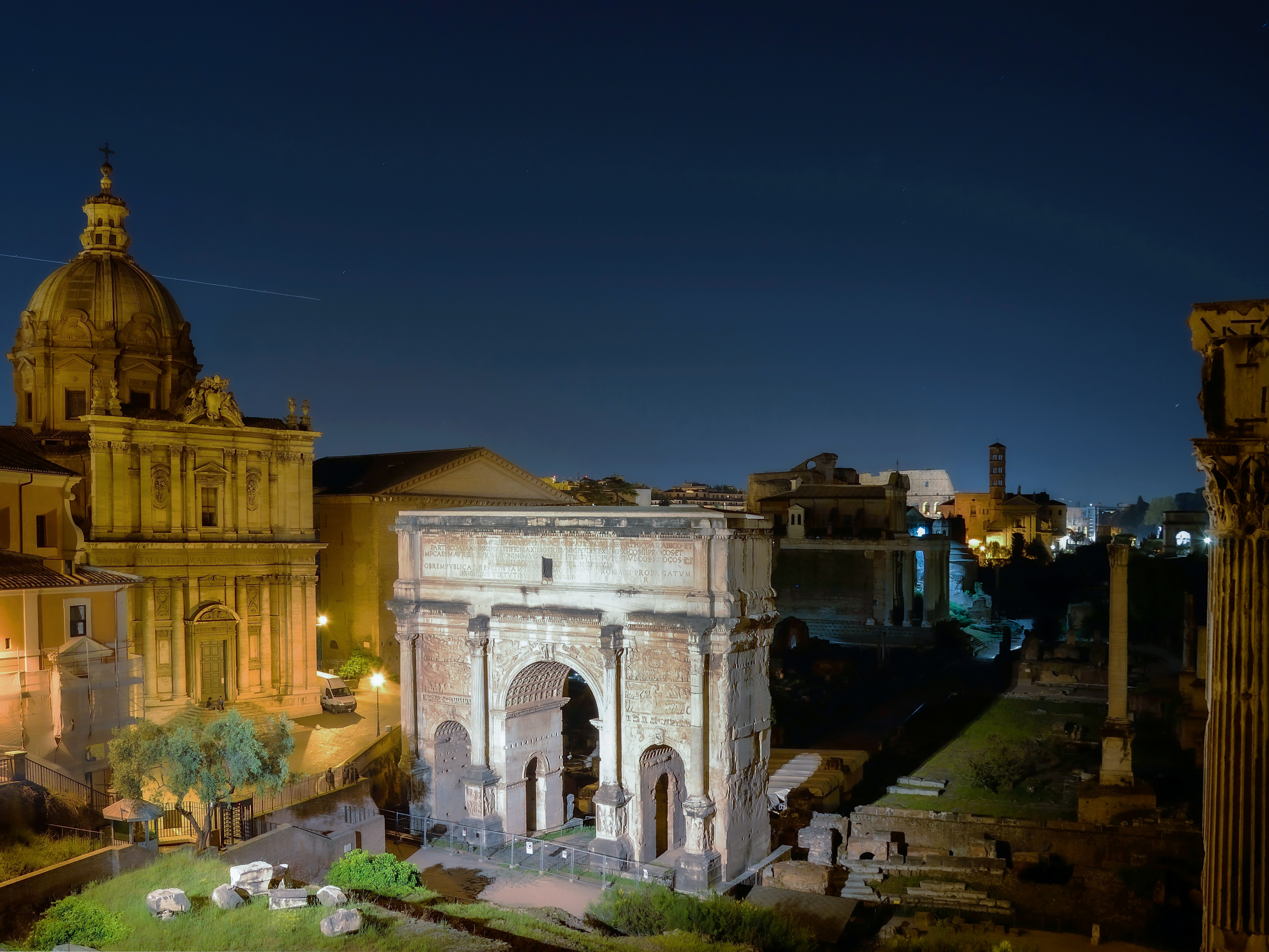
Rome, Arch of Septimus Severus

Severan art is art production by the Roman Empire under the Severan dynasty, usually taken as running from 193 to 235, through the emperors Septimius Severus, Caracalla, Heliogabalus and Alexander Severus. Official Roman art of the military anarchy which followed, ending in 253 with Gallienus, has no character of its own and so can be seen as a continuation of Severan art, and so that art can be seen as running for the whole first half of the 3rd century.

In this period began the process that ended in the rupture between Roman art and that of Late Antiquity, the watershed between classical art and that of Byzantium and the Middle Ages. Some of Severan art's products saw the emergence of obvious elements from plebeian art and provincial art, whilst in other areas traditionally Hellenistic elements were kept alive longer, such as in portraiture, which flourished in this period with masterpieces of great psychological depth.

== Sculpture ==
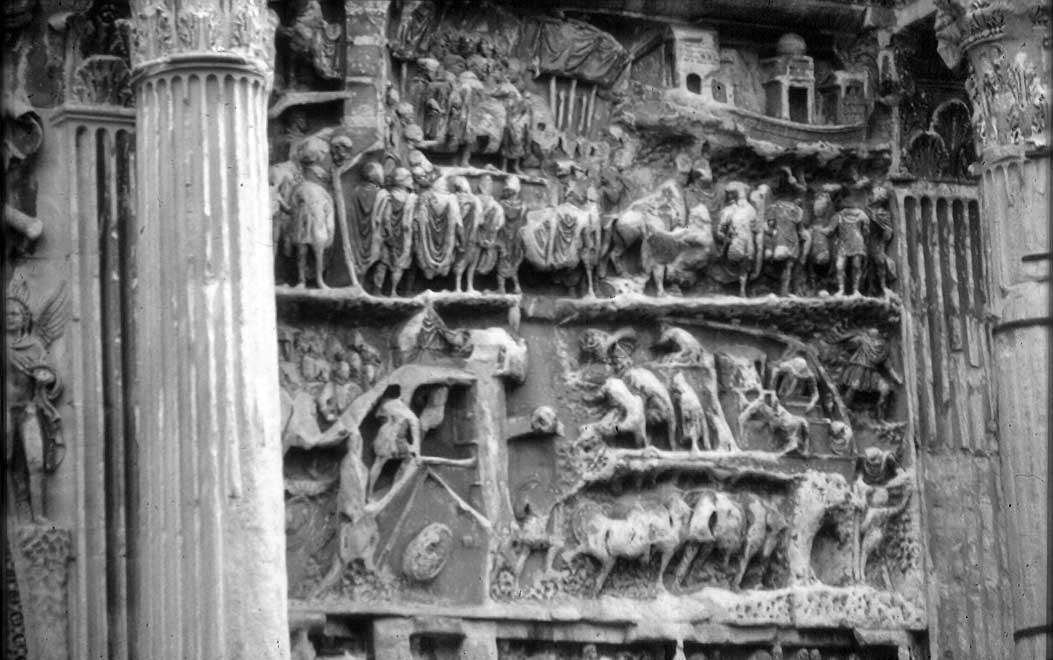
Arch of Septimius Severus, Rome, relief of the Siege and capture of Ctesiphon

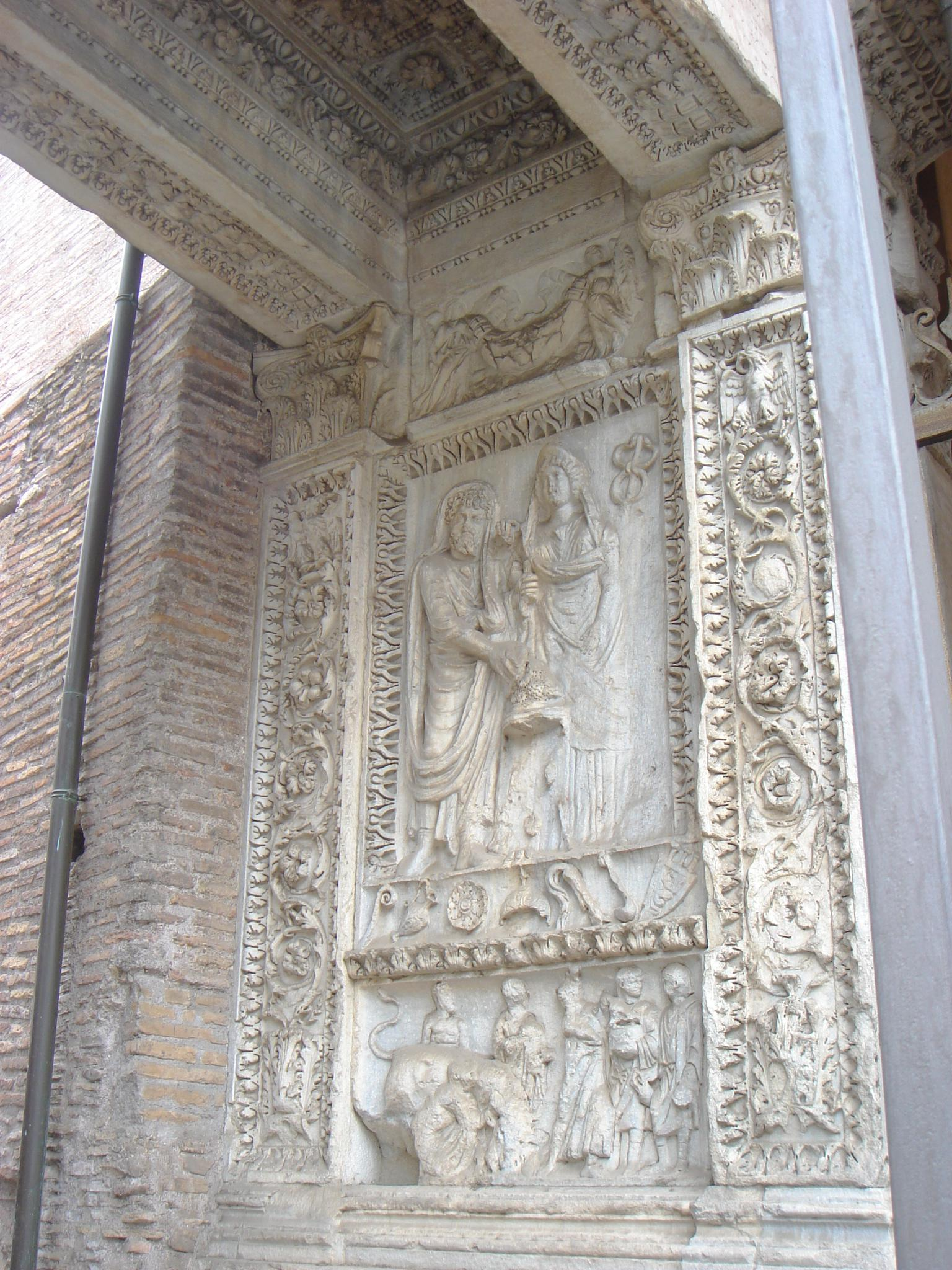
Reliefs of the Arcus Argentariorum, Rome

The most important works in Severan art were the Arch of Septimus Severus in the Roman Forum (erected for the Parthian triumph of 203); the Forum, the basilica and the Arch of Leptis Magna, the birthplace of the emperor (completed by 216); and the Arcus Argentariorum in Rome, erected in honor of the emperor by the bankers of the Forum Boarium in 204.

=== Portraits ===
The Roman portrait in the third century was one of the most significant art forms of the period. The artists, now free from the constraints linked to the Hellenistic tradition, implemented expressive characteristics into physiognomic portraits in marble and bronze. From this new style of portrait one could infer the socio-economic situation, and the difficulties of life faced by farmers soldiers.

The imperial portraits are fundamental, from which the main artistic currents of the time can be outlined. The chronology of the most important works is:

- Portrait of Caracalla, 211-217
- Portrait of Severus Alexander, 222-235
- Portrait of Maximinus Thrax, 235-238
- Portrait of Gordian III, 238-244
- Portrait of Philip the Arab, 244-249
- Portrait of Decius, 251
- Portrait of Treboniano Gallo, 251-254

Also important are some portraits of empresses, including that of the influential Julia Domna, wife of Septimius Severus and patron of Syrian artists in Rome, and that of Sallustia Orbiana, wife of Severus Alexander.

Typical of the time is the "engraving" process, with small superficial chisel strokes that draw the short hair and the hair of the beard, which was neither fashionable nor shaved, but kept short with scissors. These technical devices were frequent in Rome, though less often seen in the eastern provinces.

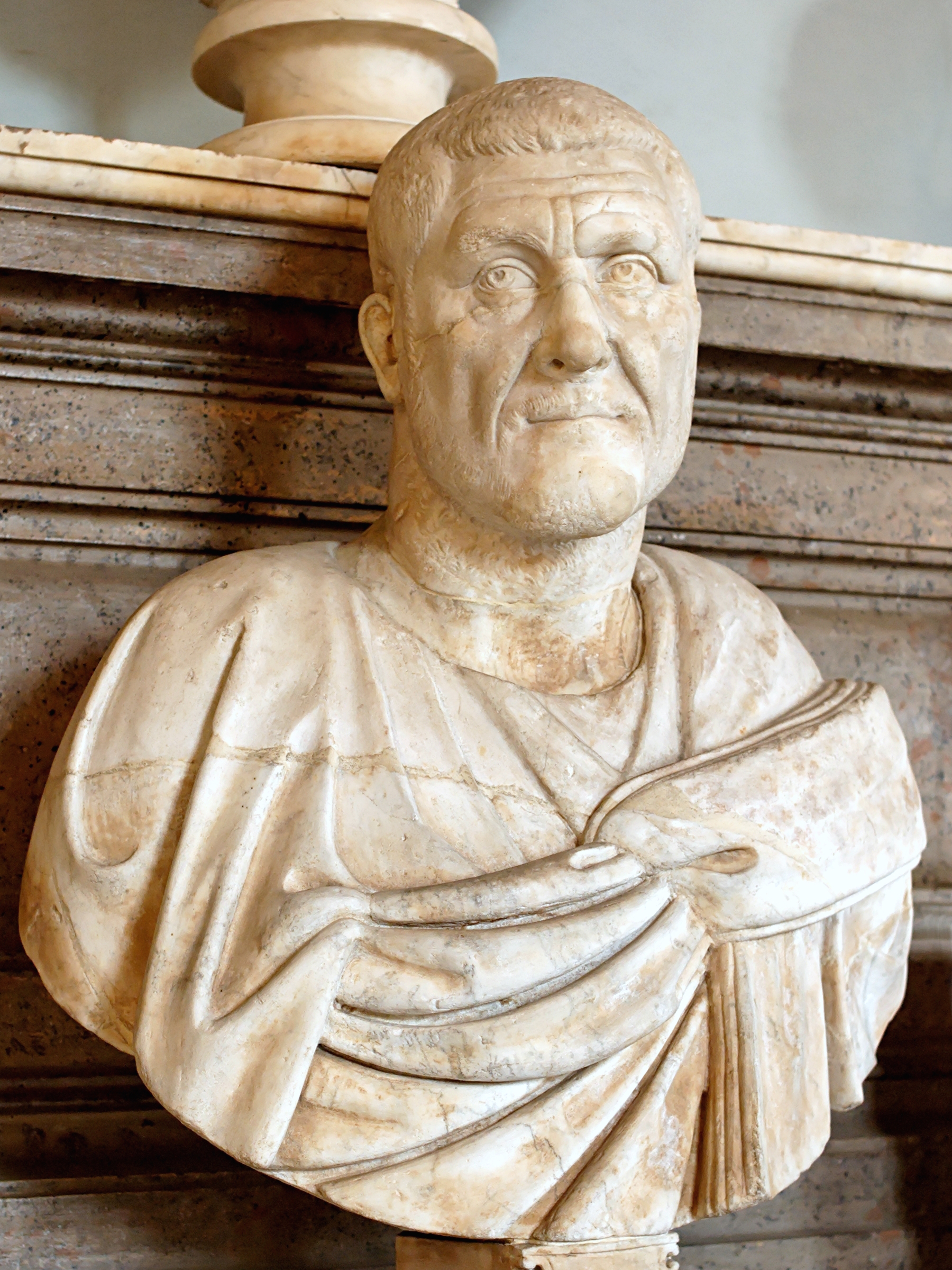
Maximinus Thrax

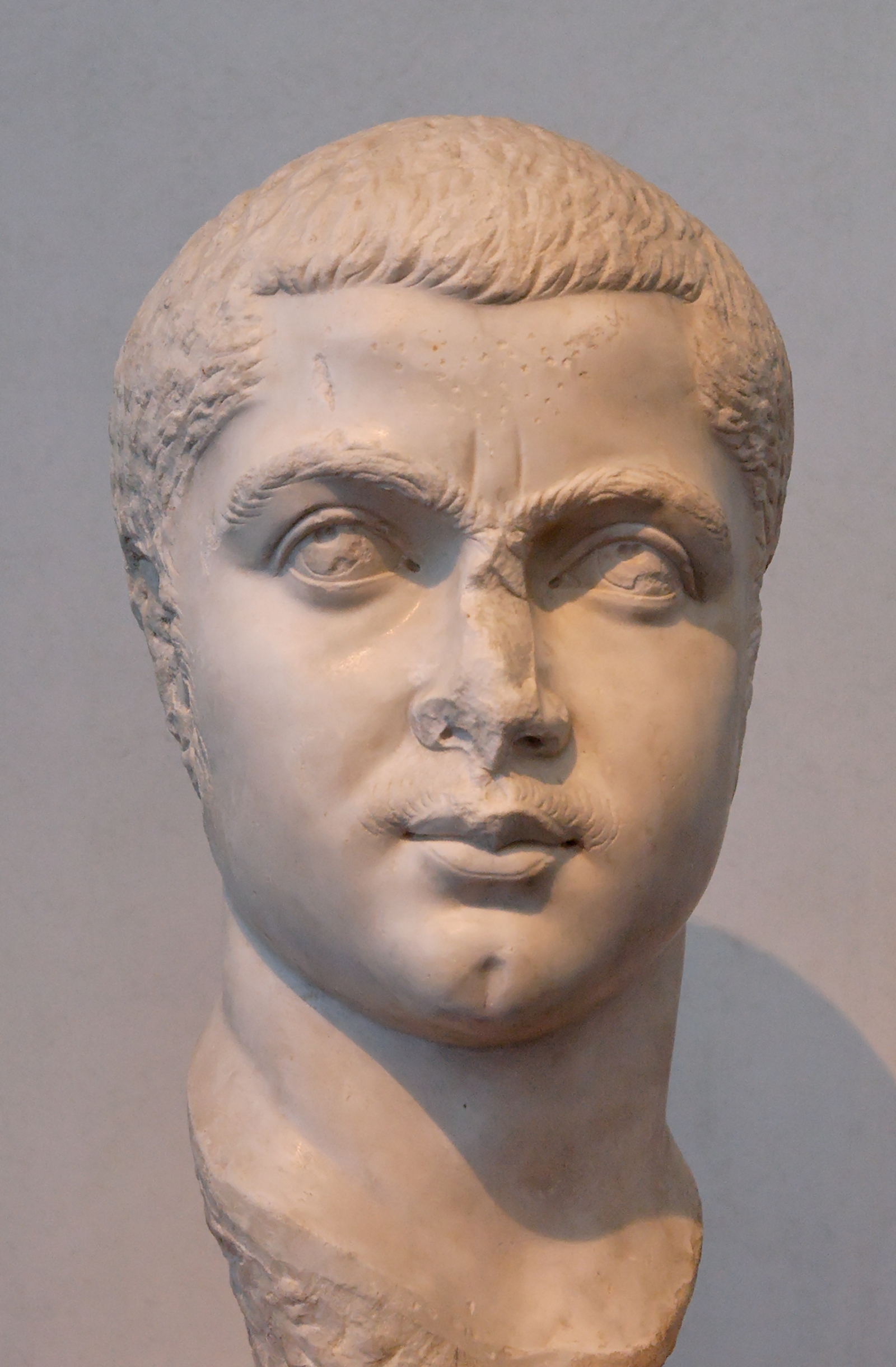
Gordian III

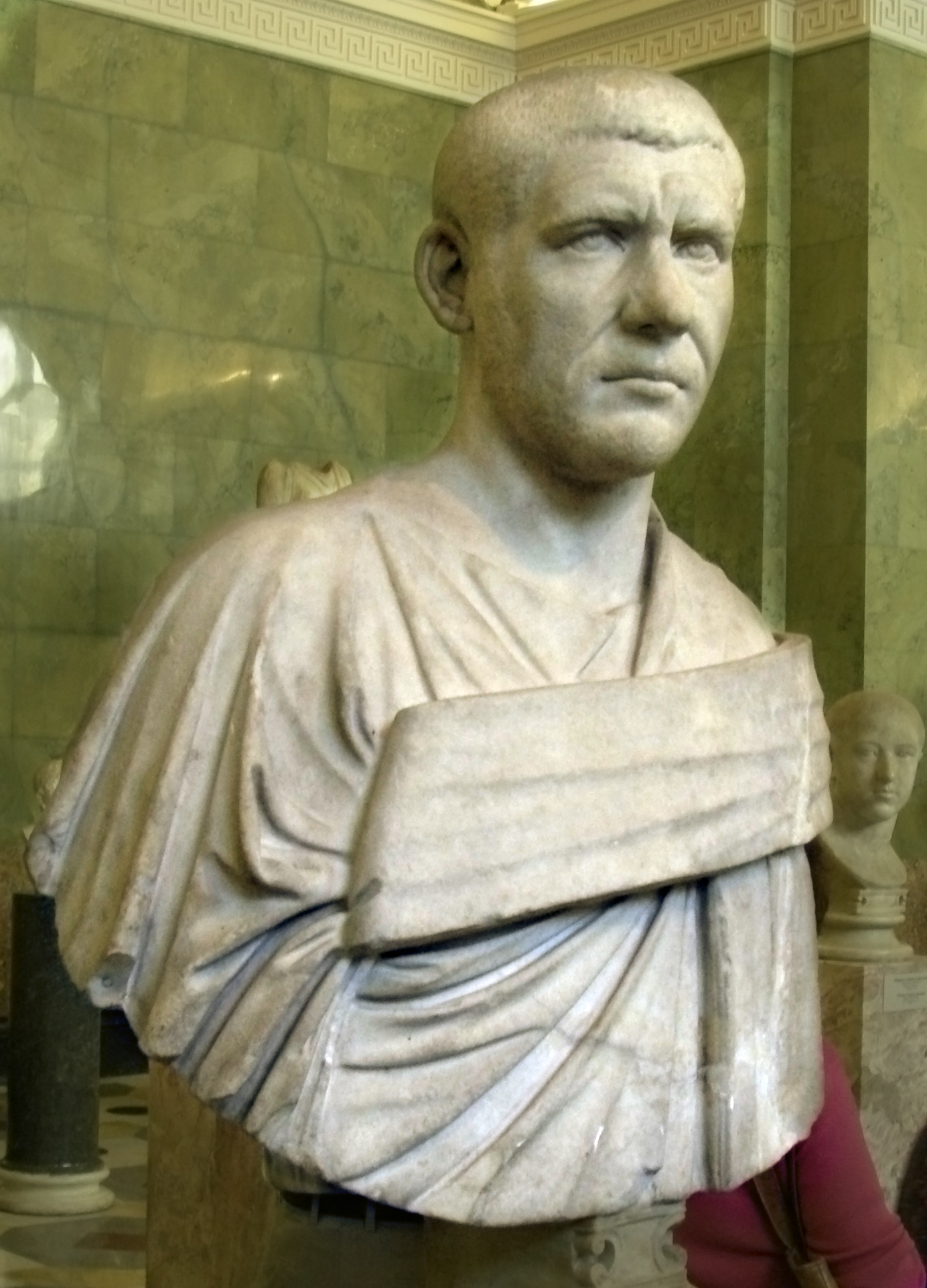
Philip the Arab

=== Sarcophagi ===
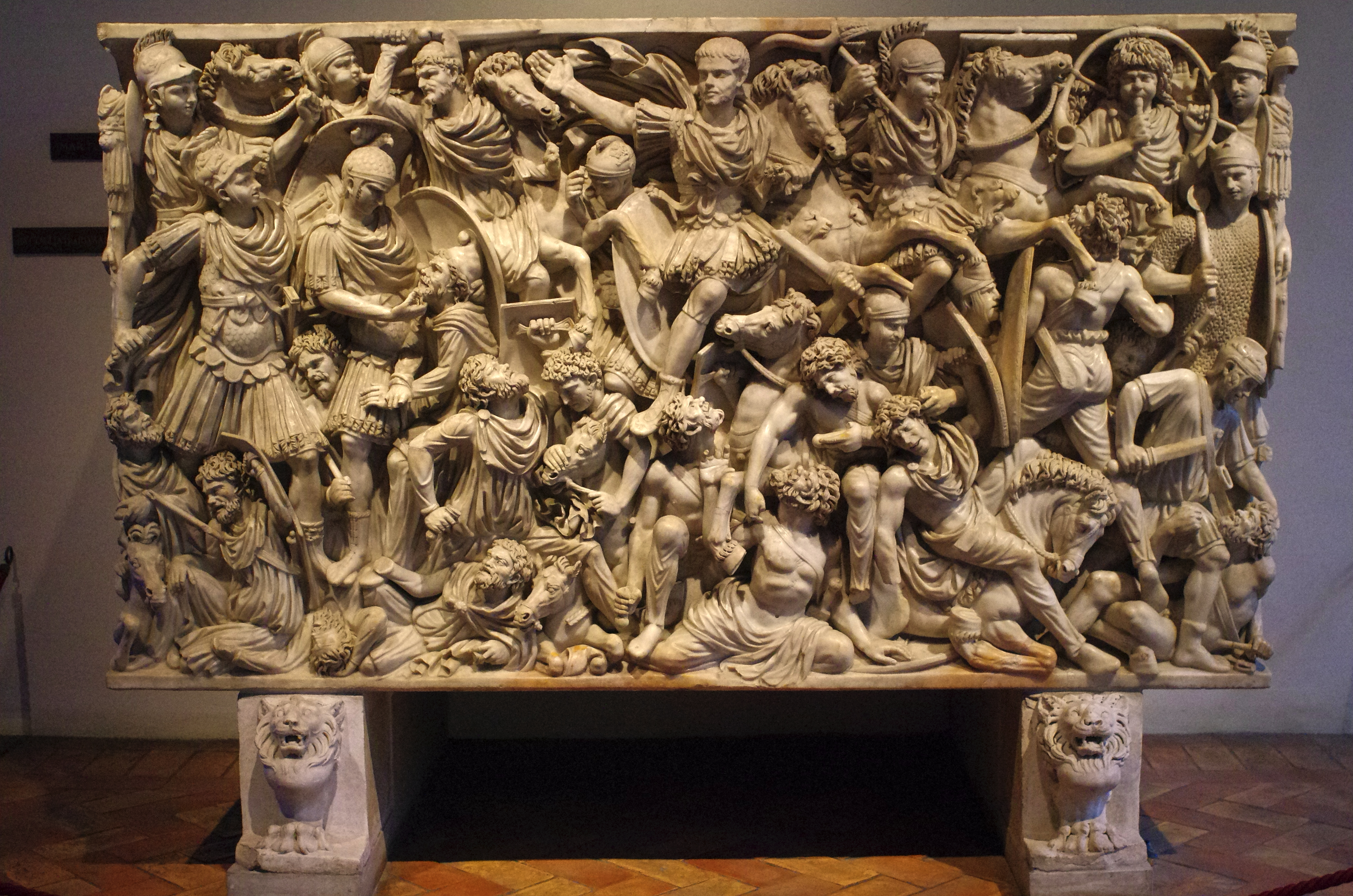
The great Ludovisi Battle sarcophagus

Monumental sarcophagi are also very representative of the artistic methods in use during the period. In Rome, there are various specimens imported from Asia Minor, while works of Roman manufacture were exported to the western provinces. One of the best known works of this period is the Ludovisi Battle sarcophagus, where the figure of the young commander on horseback was recognized as Hostilian. Typical is the production of sarcophagi with lion hunting scenes, datable between 220 and 270, added to the recent stoic concept of life as a militia. Other types are instead linked to the Cult of Dionysus adorned with symbolism that alludes to regeneration after death, just crushed grapes or wine.

Indicative of the moral thinking of individuals of the time are sarcophagi where the deceased are depicted as philosophers or muses. From these representations, born in a context strongly anchored to paganism, evolved the typologies of crypto-Christian sarcophagi of the end of the third century. Figures representing Christ and the apostles were depicted.

== Architecture ==
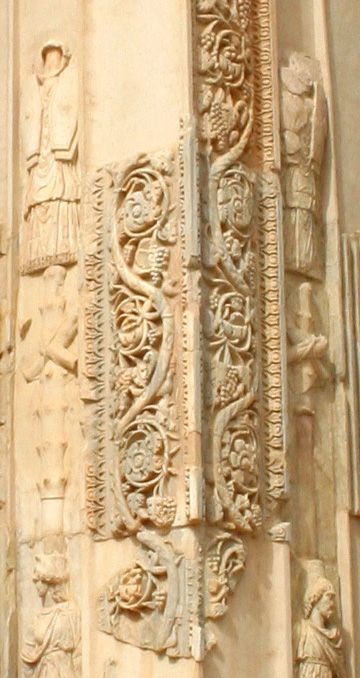
Arch of Leptis Magna

In Rome, in the wake of the fire of 191, Septimius Severus instituted a new phase of construction: the Temple of Peace, the Horrea Piperiana, and the Porticus Octaviae were rebuilt; a wing was added to the imperial palace on the Palatine Hill, with a new monumental facade towards the Via Appia; and the Septizodium, the arch of Septimius Severus and the Baths of Caracalla were raised. It is likely that the Temple of Serapis was rebuilt by the Severans.

== Bibliography ==
- (in Italian) Ranuccio Bianchi Bandinelli & Mario Torelli, L'arte dell'antichità classica, Etruria-Roma, Utet, Torino 1976.
- (in Italian) Pierluigi De Vecchi & Elda Cerchiari, I tempi dell'arte, volume 1, Bompiani, Milano 1999
