= Gloria Swanson, New York =

Photograph by Edward Steichen

The photograph as it appeared in Vanity Fair in 1928

Gloria Swanson, New York is a black and white photograph taken by American photographer Edward Steichen, in 1924. The picture depicts leading silent film actress Gloria Swanson, and it was taken for Vogue magazine. It became one of the most iconic fashion portraits that Steichen took of Hollywood film actors and actresses, and of Swanson herself.

== History and description ==
Steichen had a long photo session with Swanson in 1924, involving experimenting with many costume changes and lighting effects. Steichen explains that “At the end of the session, I took a piece of black lace veil and hung it in front of her face. She recognized the idea at once. Her eyes dilated, and her look was that of a leopardess lurking behind leafy shrubbery, watching her prey. You don’t have to explain things to a dynamic and intelligent personality like Miss Swanson. Her mind works swiftly and intuitively.”

The picture depicts Swanson, wearing a veil, looking expressionless to the camera, where her face is seen through a transparent veil of black lace, decorated with vegetable motifs.

In February 1928, the picture was published in the magazine Vanity Fair, to coincide with the release of Sadie Thompson, a film where Swanson was the leading actress.

Richard Brilliant describes this way the picture: "The silent film star appears as a magical creature, composed of eyes and mystery, an image imprintend behind a flowered veil, as if it were the black-and-white film world in which she truly lived."

== Public collections ==
There are prints of this photograph in several public collections, including the Metropolitan Museum of Art, in New York, the Museum of Modern Art, in New York, the Amon Carter Museum of American Art, in Fort Worth, and the Nelson-Atkins Museum of Art, in Kansas City.
