= Anogon =

Greek mythological character

In Greek mythology, Anogon (Ancient Greek: Ἀνώγων means 'command, exhortation') was the son of Castor, one of the Dioscuri, and Hilaeira, daughter of Leucippus of Messenia. He was also called Anaxias.
