= Arch of Septimius Severus =

Ancient Roman triumphal arch, a landmark of Rome, Italy

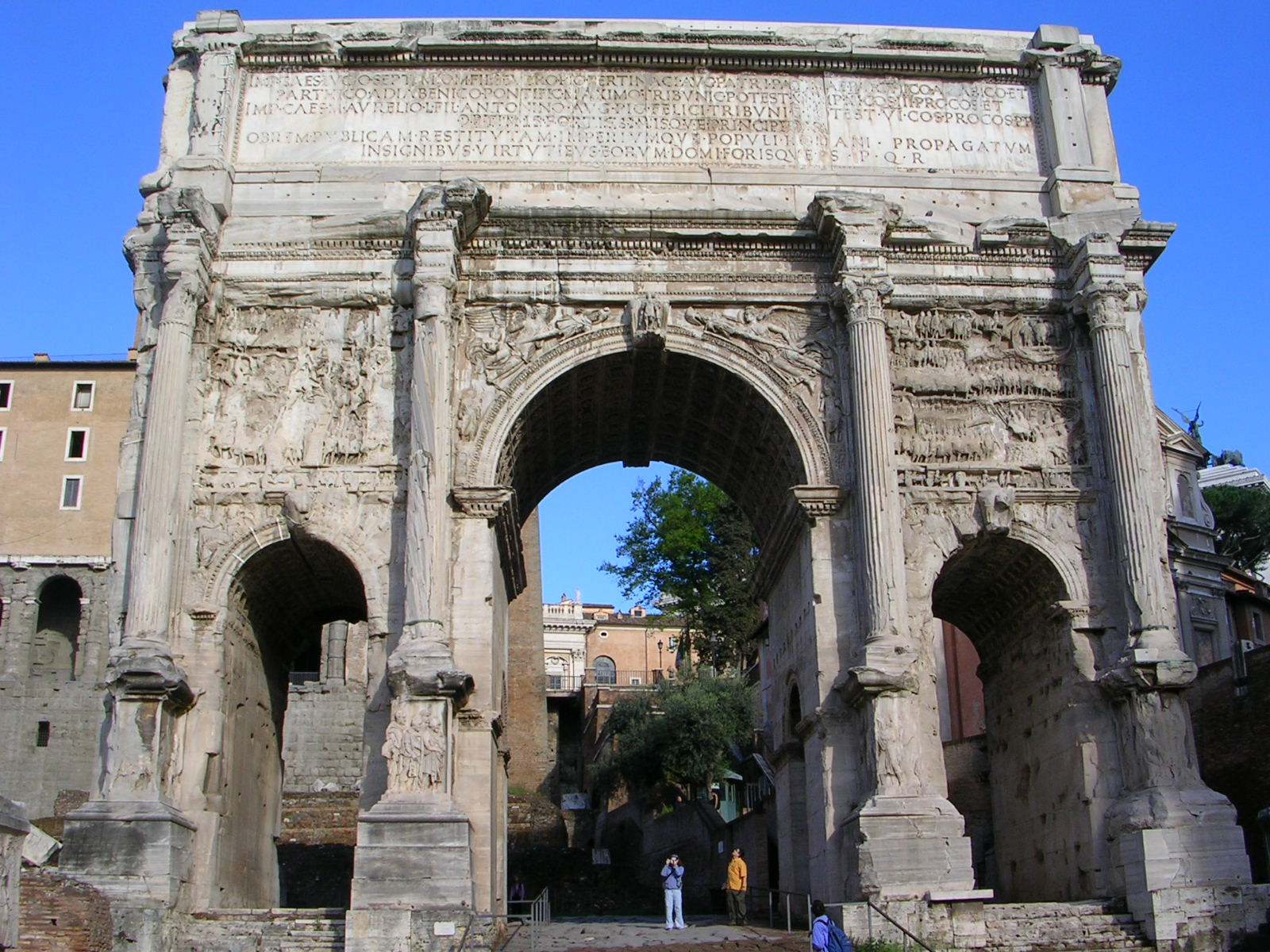
- East face of arch

- Shown within Augustan Rome
- Click on the map for a fullscreen view
- 41.892758°N 12.484744°E
- Type: Triumphal arch
- Location: Regio VIII Forum Romanum

History
- Built: 203 AD
- Built by: Septimius Severus

The Arch of Septimius Severus () at the northwestern end of the Roman Forum is a white marble triumphal arch dedicated in 203 AD to commemorate the Parthian victories of Emperor Septimius Severus and his two sons, Caracalla and Geta, in the two campaigns against the Parthians of 194–195 and 197–199. After the death of Septimius Severus, his sons Caracalla and Geta were initially joint Emperors. Caracalla had Geta assassinated in Rome; in the practice now known as damnatio memoriae, Geta's memorials were destroyed and all images or mentions of him were removed from street buildings and monuments. Accordingly, Geta's image and inscriptions referring to him were removed from the arch.

The Severan dynasty were avid builders of triumphal or honorary arches, especially in the Roman Empire; the Arch of Septimius Severus in the emperor's hometown of Leptis Magna, Libya was built in the same year. The Monumental Arch of Palmyra is also sometimes called the "Arch of Septimius Severus".

== Description ==
The arch was raised on a travertine base originally approached by steps from the Forum's ancient level. The central archway, spanned by a richly coffered semicircular vault, has lateral openings to each side archway, a feature copied in many Early Modern triumphal arches. The Arch is about 23 m (75 ft) in height and 25 m (82 ft) wide. The arch bears two sets of reliefs. The first set includes four large panels on each face of the attic and the second set consists of eight panels that are set into the inner face of the four archways.

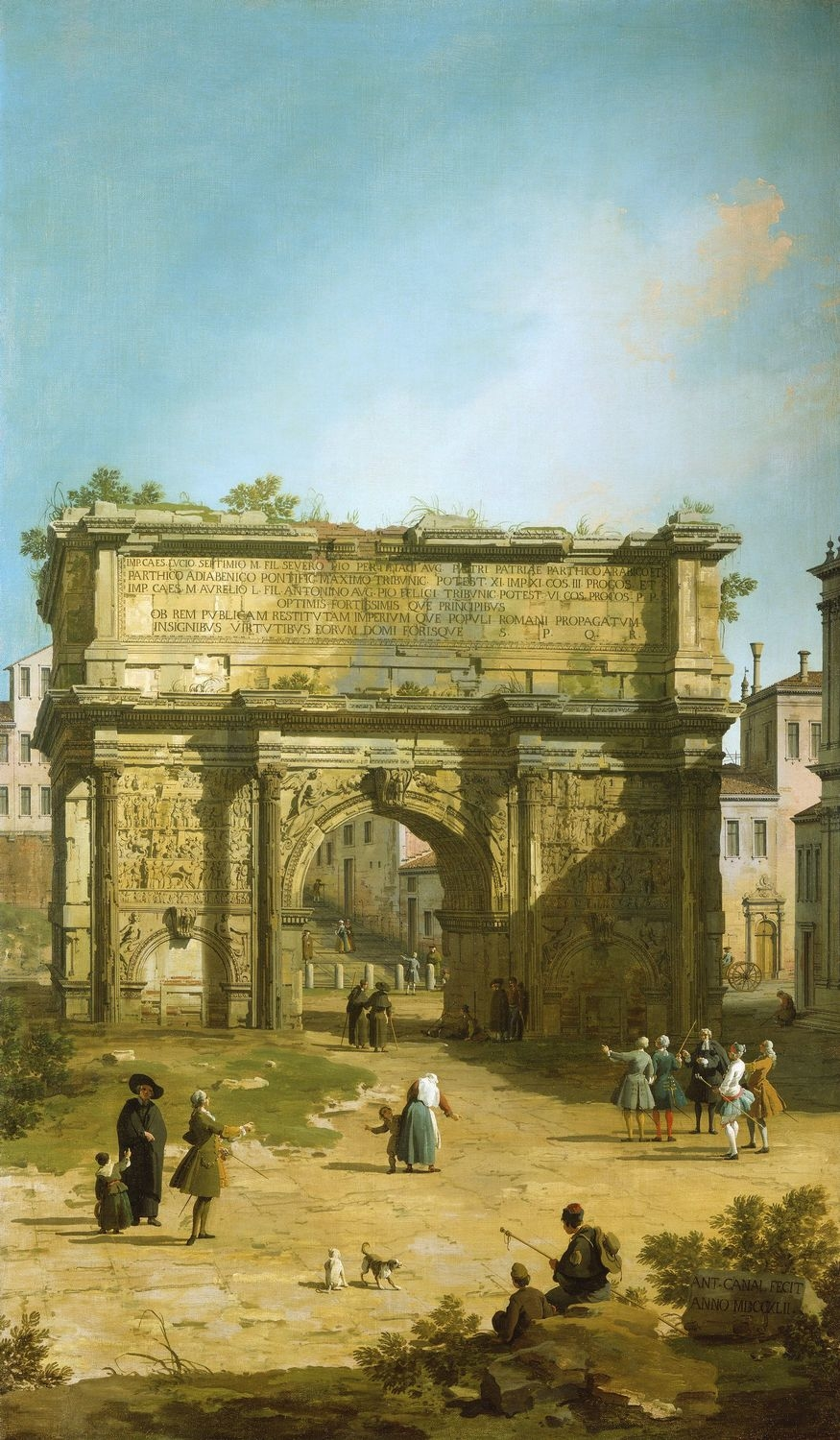
The Arch of Septimius Severus painted by Canaletto in 1742, before the excavation of the Roman Forum (Royal Collection, UK)

The three archways rest on piers, which are composite columns on pedestals. Winged Victories are carved in relief in the spandrels. A staircase in the south pier leads to the top of the monument. Previously, the top of the arch had statues of the emperor and his two sons in a four-horse chariot (quadriga), accompanied by soldiers.

The master architect is unknown, but he worked with a skill level that allowed him to create the arch in a quick and traditional manner. Although traditional with the columns, piers, and cornices, the style in which the architect shows the effects of texture, and the prominent and versatile planes, show a hint of deviation from the classical style. According the scholar Richard Brilliant, the variety of styles shown on the arch signify that many different workshops and sculptors were involved. This was a way to have the commission completed quickly. Brilliant made this conclusion by identifying how the same models for the motifs have small differences throughout the reliefs. Even individual sections such as the panels, middle reliefs, and column pedestals have distinctive techniques or styles that must have come from separate artists. The differences in styles are not so drastic as to stick out, but they are enough that an expert can identify a shift. The arch also has some sections that are more detailed than the others indicating more time was spent on them, which is normal when different sculptors in a workshop work on the same object. Those who worked on the arch were taught in the Antonine style, which was known for its rich ornamentation and use of Proconnesian marble.

To help add depth to the arch, the shadows of the façade are deepened with columns and 3-D-like cornices. The façade is created in tetrastyle, where four columns are used to create a porch. The tetrastyle façade in the Severus Septimius arch is only an illusion, as it does not have a deep porch-like space behind the columns.

== Materials ==
The materials of the arch are mostly made of travertine and marble mixed in with concrete and brick. Proconnesian marble was used for the columns, Pentelic marble for the masonry, and Luna marble for the greater relief columns. The marble blocks were precisely cut in a format that made the shapes of each block rectangular. Each block, whether horizontal or vertical is fitted very closely together and it is unclear how this was possible without taking the arch apart. It is believed that the blocks of marble were cut while they were still on the ground. To avoid damage to ornamentation, the details were first roughly made while on the ground, and were later perfected and detailed once the blocks were in the proper placement. Most of the arch must have been preplanned in design and careful alignment before it was put into place. The fine details in construction show that this monument was made by some of the best professionals of the time.

== Decoration ==
Since the arch was created with the purpose of acting as a show of victory and Imperialistic propaganda, the ornamentation was essential and specific. The arch shows the vertical elevation that is common in the Roman canon of decoration and how the designer added horizontal accents.

The decorations of the attic were meant to show the achievements of the Imperial family. Evidence from Severan coins show that although no longer standing, the top of the attic used to have a chariot pulled by six horses and two riders made of gilded bronze. These sculptures most likely acted as trophy-bearers. The attic was designed to decoratively frame the inscription on the arch. This is evident through the gilding and sizing of the letters. Because the letters were gilded, the reflection on them during a sunny day would have made the sentences hard to read, but they would have been legible in the afternoon. The dowel-holes on the base of the attic show that there used to be some sort of metal ornament attached, most likely in the form of floral or trophic symbols. The attic has cornices with Lesbian cymation with a rosette around the inscription and there is double molding with an Acanthus bands as well. The arch uses the style that was common in Imperial architecture that used the Corinthian columns.

== Iconography ==
Winged Victories (Victorias) on the spandrel of the arch

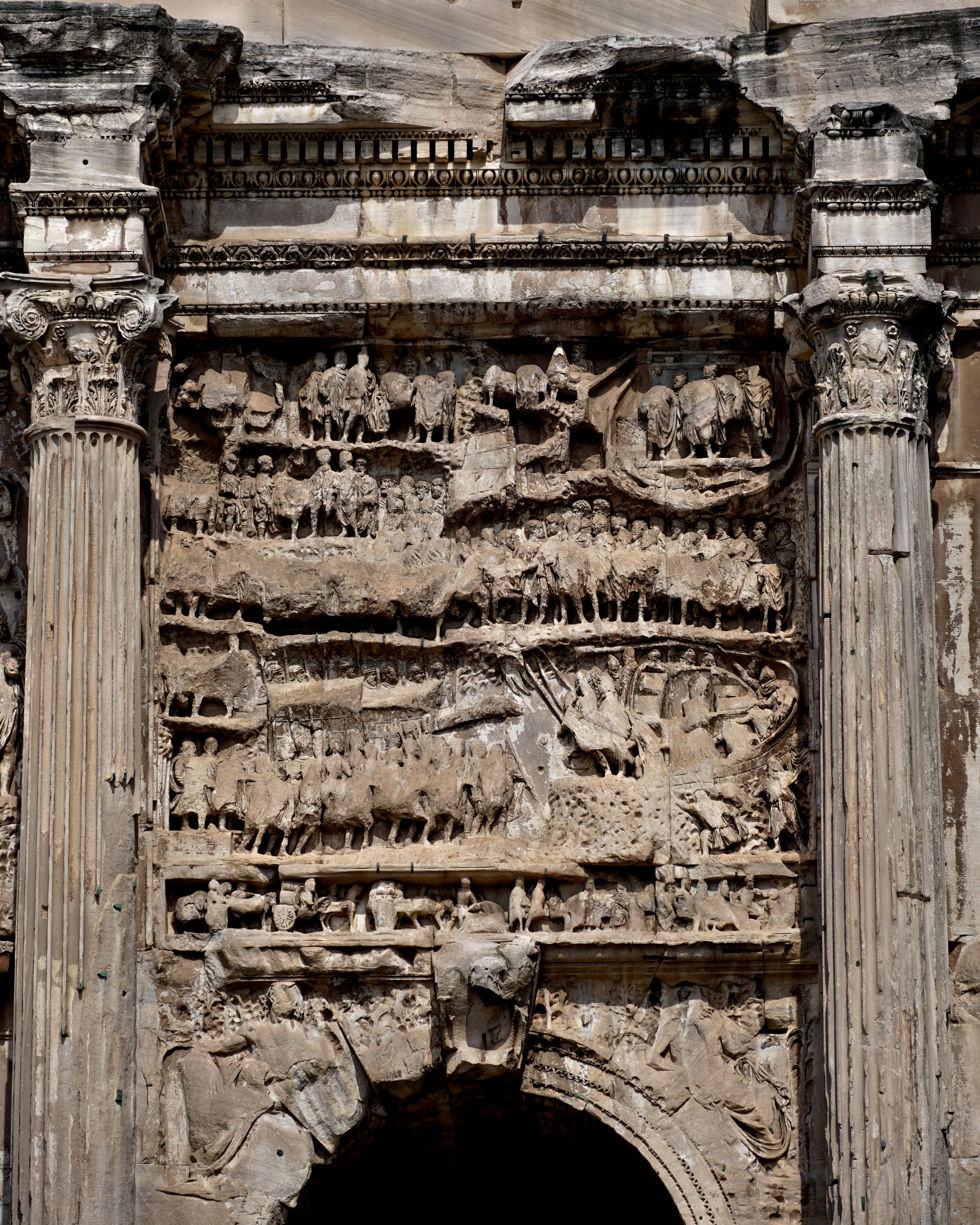
This relief panel depicts events in Edessa during the Parthian War.

Throughout the arch, there are many reliefs. Near the spandrels of the arch entryway are flying Victorias that mark the victory of the emperor. There are four statues underneath the Victorias that represent the four seasons. Prisoners of war are shown on the pedestals nearest to the ground floor. Visitors walking through the arch would see these images, and be reminded of the imperial victories of Septimius Severus. Some of these prisoners have gloomy faces, and others have their hands behind their back while Roman soldier stands behind them. The loot and booty taken by Septimius Severus and his men are shown under the four main reliefs. The loot is being transported on a cart being pulled by a large animal. The arch has four main relief panels that show scenes of the Roman wars against the Parthian Empire.

Relief one: The arch represents the siege of Nisibis from 195 AD in the first Parthian war. The knight who stands guarding the city gate is the knight whom Septimius Severus had to protect the city of Nisibis after the war. Nisibis is shown in the first panel because it is considered the causa belli (instigator of a war) to the first war against the Parthians. The small building towards the bottom of the panel represents the Roman camp that was put up during the siege of Nisibis by the Osroeni and Adiabeni who were defeated by Severus. The multitude of figures represent the battle in which Severus defeated Osroeni and Adiabeni in the first Parthian war.

Relief two: This scene has many interpretations. One interpretation of this panel is that it is a scene of a revolt of Edessa, an ally of Rome. although the bottom section looks like a battle, it is said to be instead a surrender by king Abgrus to the emperor who stands in front of the other Edessian figures, receiving their submission. The center section shows the king surrendering to the emperor. Another theory of this panel states that this scene shows an agreement made between emperor Severus and the city of Hatra. The way the emperor holds his spear downwards implies there is a lack of aggression on his behalf. The other figure, is not kneeling which contradicts the submissive theory.

Relief three: This panel is on the capitol side and is a relief of the second Parthian campaign. Shown on the left of the relief are the Romans attacking the city of Seleucia. The figures fleeing on the left and right side are the Parthian soldiers, and the top of the relief shows the citizens who are surrendering to the Romans.

Relief four: The relief on the right facing the capitol shows the Romans taking over the city of Ctesiphon, the final battle of the Parthian war. One of the indicators that this is a siege and sacking of the city, is the large siege engine shown in the bottom left section of the panel. To the right, the city is shown surrendering to the Romans. The upper right quadrant shows emperor Septimius Severus announcing Caracalla, his eldest son, as co-ruler and Geta his youngest son, as the crowned prince.

== History ==
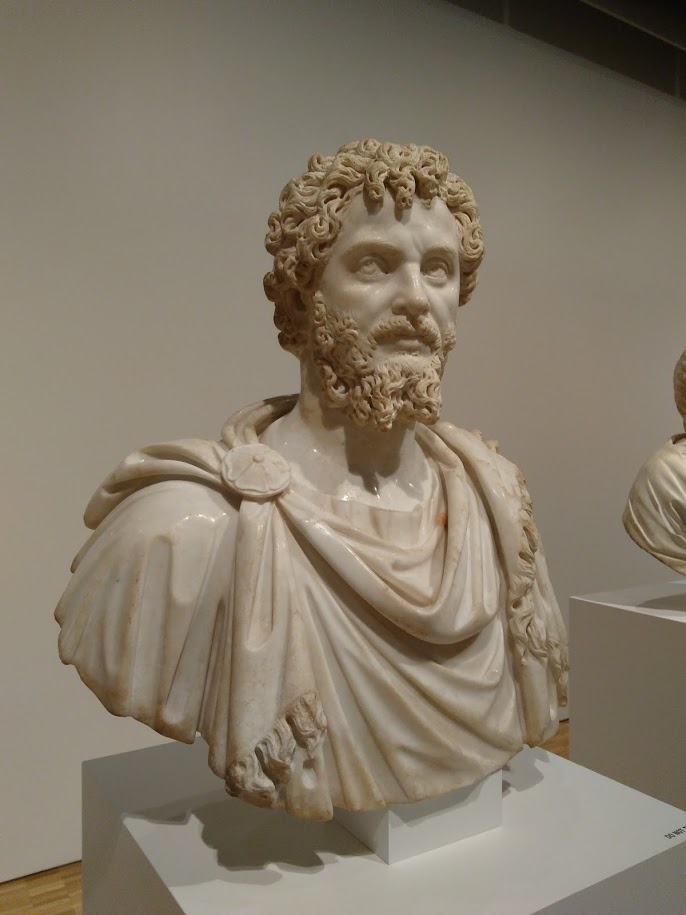
Roman Marble Bust of Septimius Severus, Eskenazi Museum of Art

After the second century AD, it was common for Roman emperors to use triumphal arches to announce their achievements in a way and a place that would allow for all Romans to see. The arch is significant because it was a purposeful tool of imperialistic propaganda, created during the forming of the Roman state. It was commissioned to celebrate the Parthian Victory, but also to boast about the Severan dynasty. His victory against the Parthians started in 197 AD, when he traveled to Nisibis in Mesopotamia to take back the city that was besieged by the Parthian empire. Once he took back the Roman occupied city of Nisbis from the Parthians, he took his army to take over other Parthian cities such as Seleucia in Babylon and the capital city Ctesiphon. The wars created by Septimius Severus led to the Romans acquiring Northern Mesopotamia.

Coins with images of the arch began to be created by Septimius and Caracalla in order to show the Romans the completion of this work. It is said that the coin and the actual arch are very similar in depiction. Emperor Septimius Severus decided to name his sons Geta and Caracalla heirs to his throne where they were meant to rule alongside each other. After the Death of Septimius Severus, Geta was murdered by his brother Caracalla.

== Topography ==
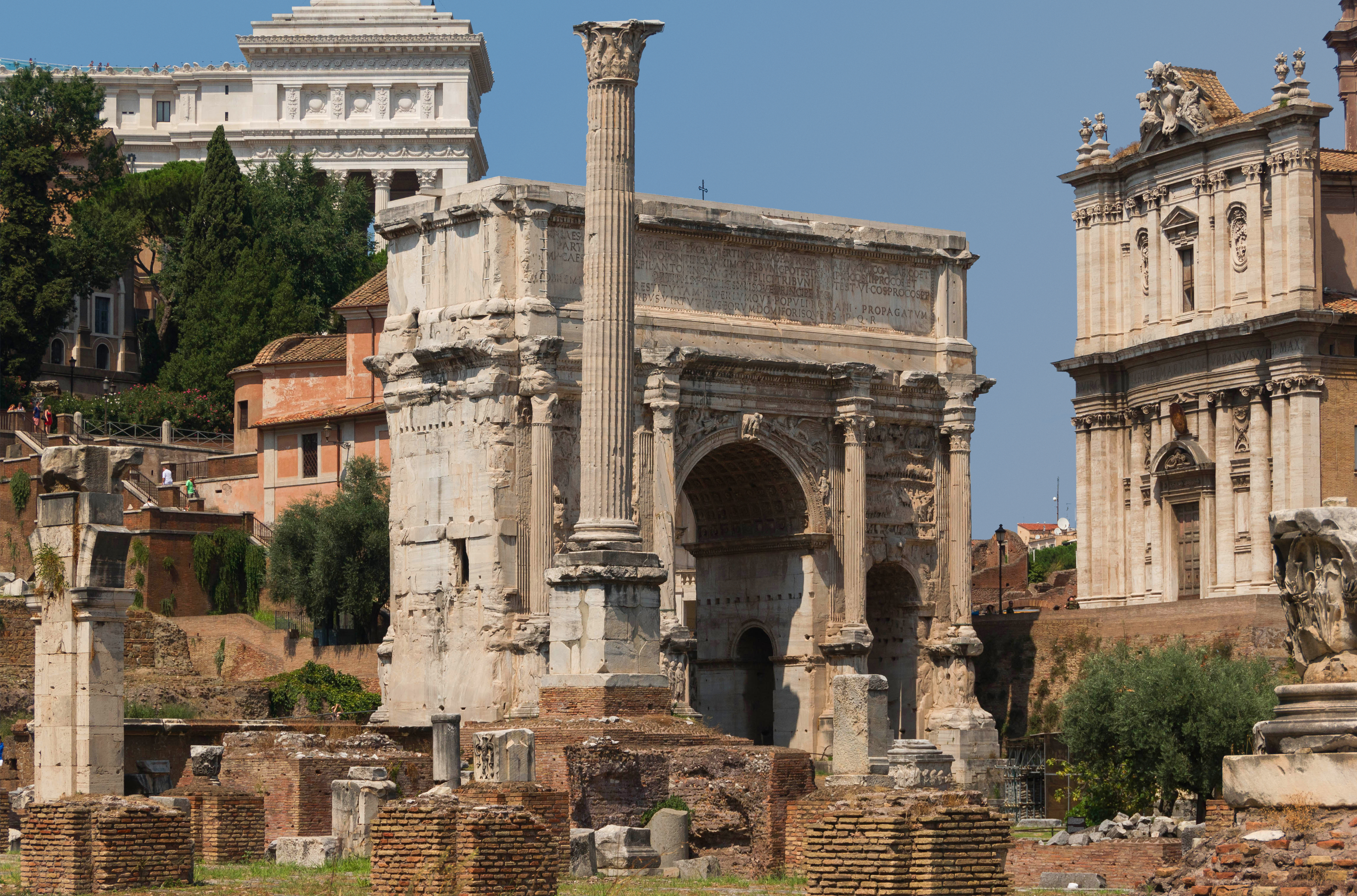
In its setting

Many triumphal arches are in the Sacra Via, which is the triumphal procession inside the Roman Forum. This made the arch of Septimius Severus stand out as an independent arch. Because of its positioning near the comitium, only people who got around on foot could witness the monument.

After eight years without a new Imperial commission within the Forum, the Arch of Septimius was erected. The arch was a way that the emperor could show his Roman patriotism while also keeping traditions alive. Before Septimius' arch was erected to celebrate his victories, there was a bronze equestrian statue. The statue represented his “Pertinax Dream” where he foresaw his rise to the throne. His defeat of the Parthians was a way to “legitimize the succession” that helped Rome become a place of peace. The arch stands between the Rostra Augusti and the Cuna represent the connection between the Senate and the emperor.

== Damage ==
The most damaged area of the arch are the relief panels that are covered with erosion and dark crusting that wears away the brittle surface. The hydrocarbonic fumes together with the marble have led to chemical reactions that cause the vulnerable coating to thicken. Fire damage is evident on the first greater panel on the left because of the calcine seen on the marble. There is also damage on the cornices that project outward and on top of the arch. Besides these damaged areas, the arch is in decent condition. Skilled masons and architects of the Severan Dynasty are an essential part of why the monument still stands throughout the wares of time and nature.

== Restoration ==
The Arch stands close to the foot of the Capitoline Hill, and a little to the east, three Corinthian pillars which are the remains of the Temple of Jupiter Tonans. A flight of steps originally led to the central opening, as one still does to the Arch of Trajan at Ancona. By the 4th century, erosion had raised the level of the Forum so much that a roadway was put through the Arch for the first time. So much debris and silt eroded from the surrounding hills that the arch was embedded to the base of the columns. The damage wrought by wheeled medieval and early modern traffic can still be seen on the column bases, above the bas-reliefs of the socles.

During the Middle Ages repeated flooding of the low-lying Forum washed in so much additional sediment and debris that when Canaletto painted it in 1742, only the upper half of the Arch showed above ground. The well-preserved condition of the Arch owes a good deal to its having been incorporated into the structure of a Christian church, given 1199 by Pope Innocent III to the church of Ss. Sergio and Bacco. Half the Arch belonged to the Cimini family, who is also attributed for the preservation of the structure (Claustrum Cimini). The stronghold included a tower placed on top of the Arch itself. When the church was refounded elsewhere, the arch remained ecclesiastical property and was not demolished for other construction.

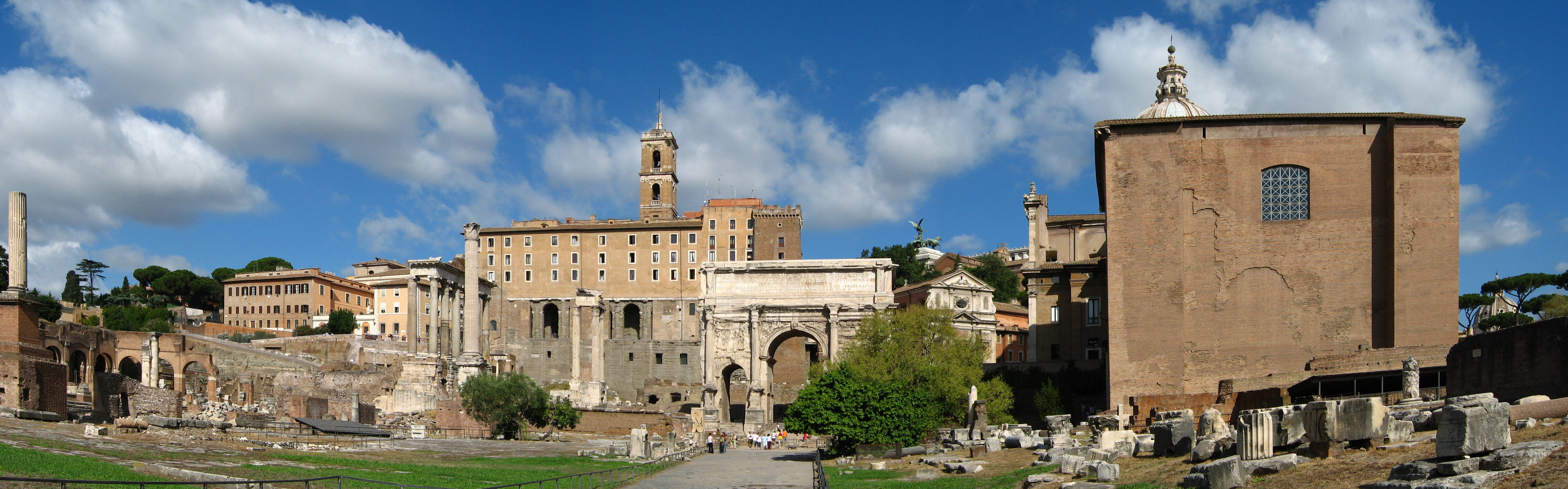
The Arch of Septimius Severus stands near the centre of this panorama

== Dedicatory inscription ==
The inscription is one of the most significant characteristics of the arch.

The dedicatory inscription on the arch reads:

IMP⸱CAES⸱LVCIO⸱SEPTIMIO⸱M⸱FIL⸱SEVERO⸱PIO⸱PERTINACI⸱AVG⸱PATRI PATRIAE PARTHICO⸱ARABICO⸱ET
PARTHICO⸱ADIABENICO⸱PONTIFIC⸱MAXIMO⸱TRIBUNIC⸱POTEST⸱XI⸱IMP⸱XI⸱COS⸱III⸱PROCOS⸱ET
IMP⸱CAES⸱M⸱AVRELIO⸱L⸱FIL⸱ANTONINO⸱AVG⸱PIO⸱FELICI⸱TRIBUNIC⸱POTEST⸱VI⸱COS⸱PROCOS⸱P⸱P
OPTIMIS⸱FORTISSIMISQVE⸱PRINCIPIBUS
OB⸱REM⸱PVBLICAM⸱RESTITVTAM⸱IMPERIVMQVE⸱POPVLI⸱ROMANI⸱PROPAGATVM
INSIGNIBVS⸱VIRTVTIBVS⸱EORVM⸱DOMI⸱FORISQVE⸱S ⸱ P ⸱ Q ⸱ R

Imp[eratori] Caes[ari] Lucio Septimio M[arci] fil[io] Severo Pio Pertinaci Aug[usto] patri patriae Parthico Arabico et
Parthico Adiabenico pontific[i] maximo tribunic[ia] potest[ate] XI imp[eratori] XI, co[n]s[uli] III proco[n]s[uli] et
imp[eratori] Caes[ari] M[arco] Aurelio L[ucii] fil[io] Antonino Aug[usto] Pio Felici tribunic[ia] potest[ate] VI co[n]s[uli] proco[n]s[uli] (p[atri] p[atriae]
optimis fortissimisque principibus)
ob rem publicam restitutam imperiumque populi Romani propagatum insignibus virtutibus eorum domi forisque S[enatus] P[opulus] Q[ue] R[omanus].

In English:

"To the emperor Caesar Lucius Septimius Severus Pius Pertinax Augustus Parthicus Arabicus Parthicus Adiabenicus, son of Marcus, father of his country, Pontifex Maximus, holding the tribunician power for the eleventh time, acclaimed imperator eleven times, thrice consul, and proconsul, and to the emperor Caesar Marcus Aurelius Antoninus Augustus Pius Felix, son of Lucius, holding the tribunician power six times, consul, and proconsul (fathers of their country, the best and bravest emperors), on account of the restored republic and the rule of the Roman people spread by their outstanding virtues at home and abroad, The Roman Senate and People (sc. dedicate this monument)"

Septimius Severus was ruling jointly as emperor with his son Caracalla (Marcus Aurelius Antoninus) when the arch was dedicated. The parenthesized section in the middle is text that replaced an original reference to his other son Geta, which was chiseled out upon Geta's damnatio memoriae by Caracalla to erase his memory in history.

== Gallery ==
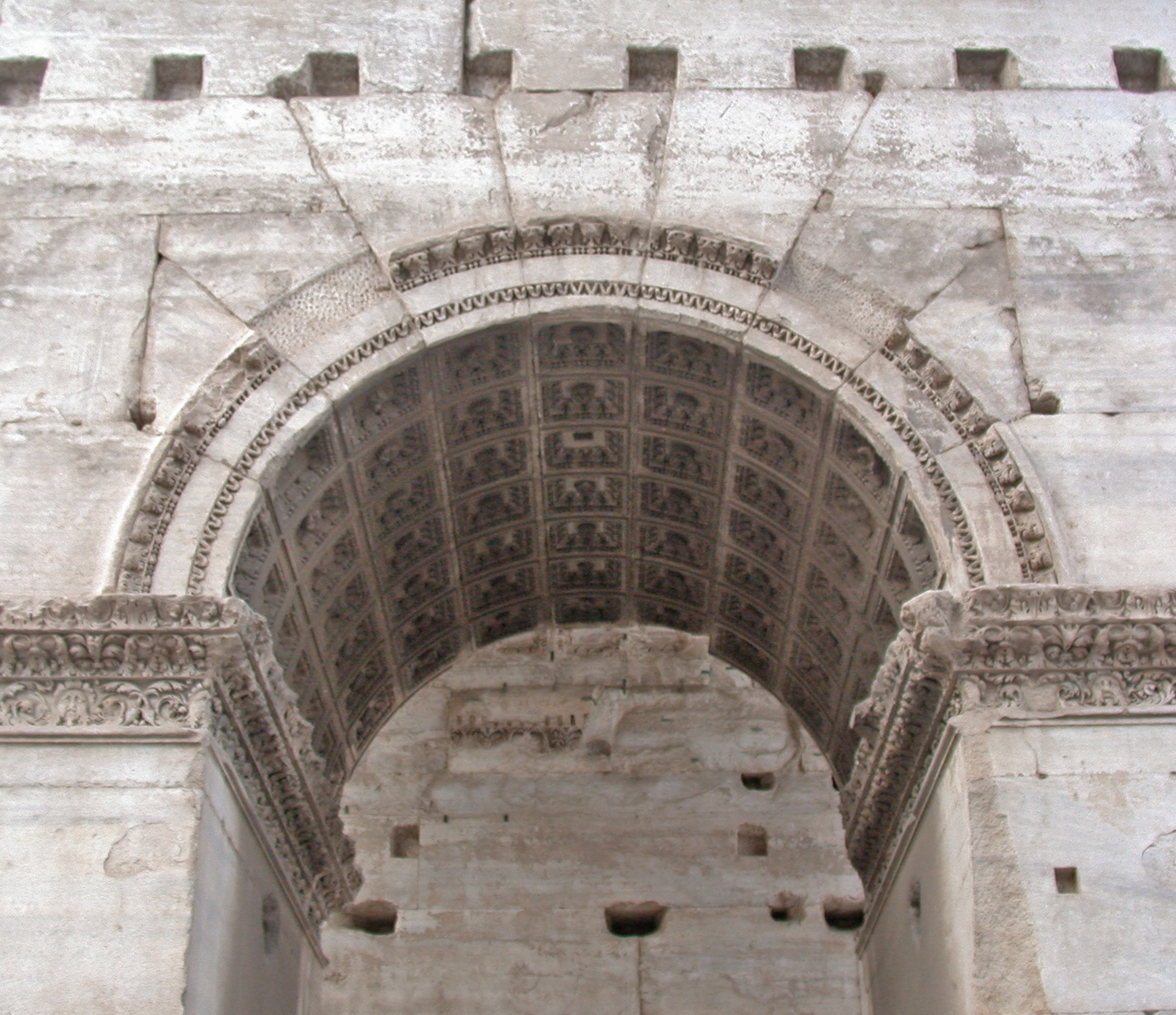
Lateral arched opening between the main arch and a side archway

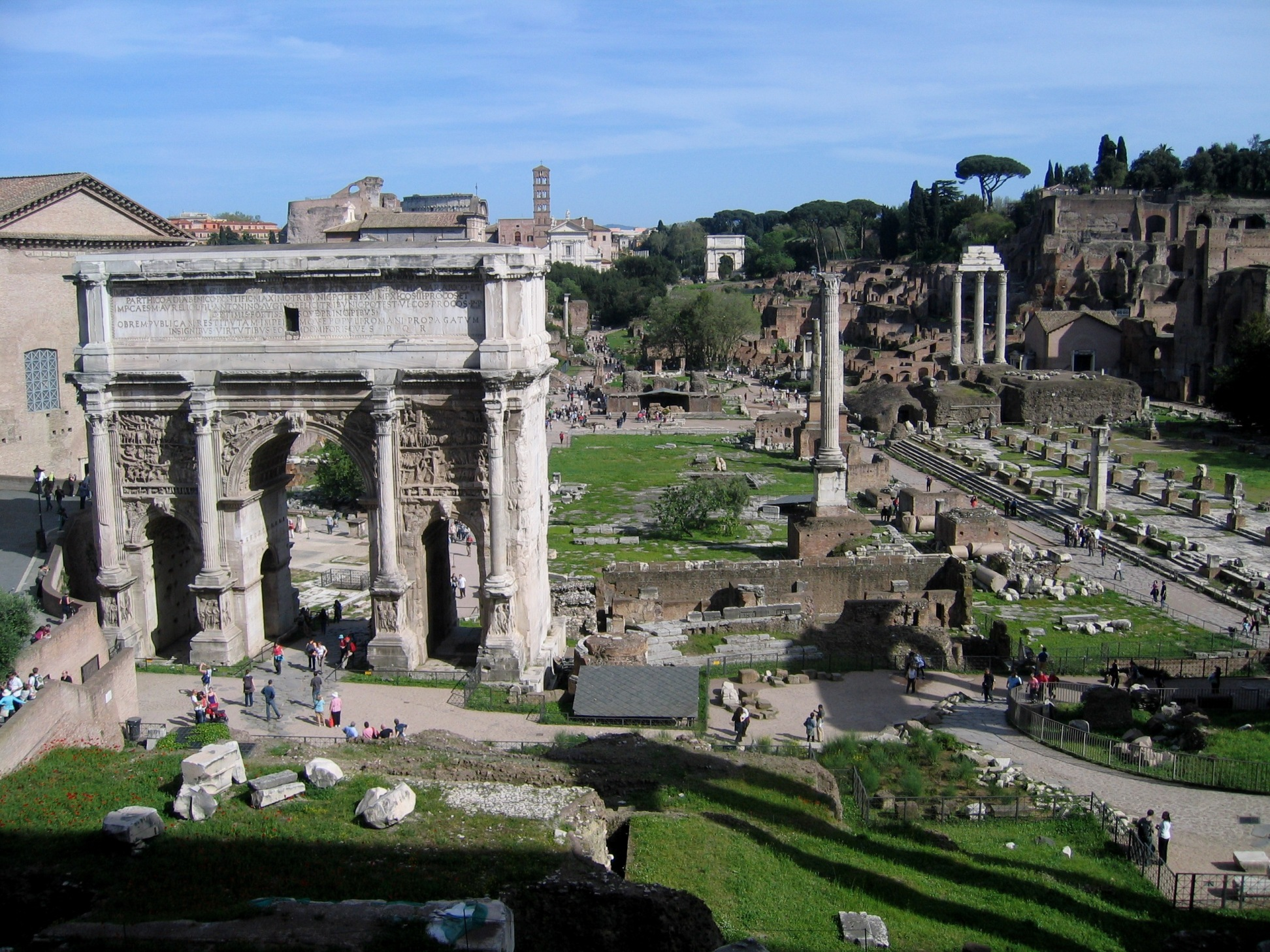
Arch of Septimius Severus and the Roman Forum

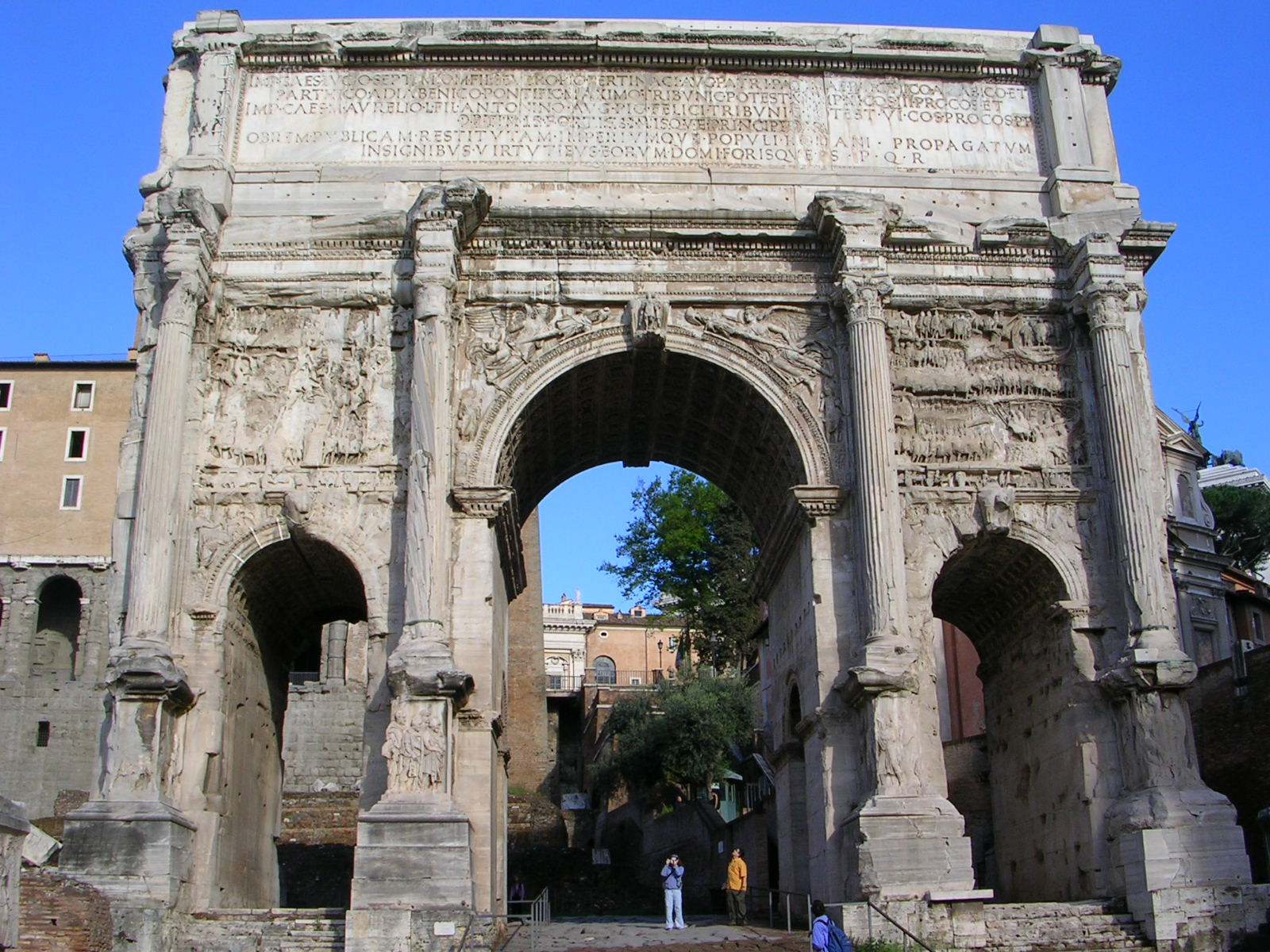
The Arch of Septimius Severus

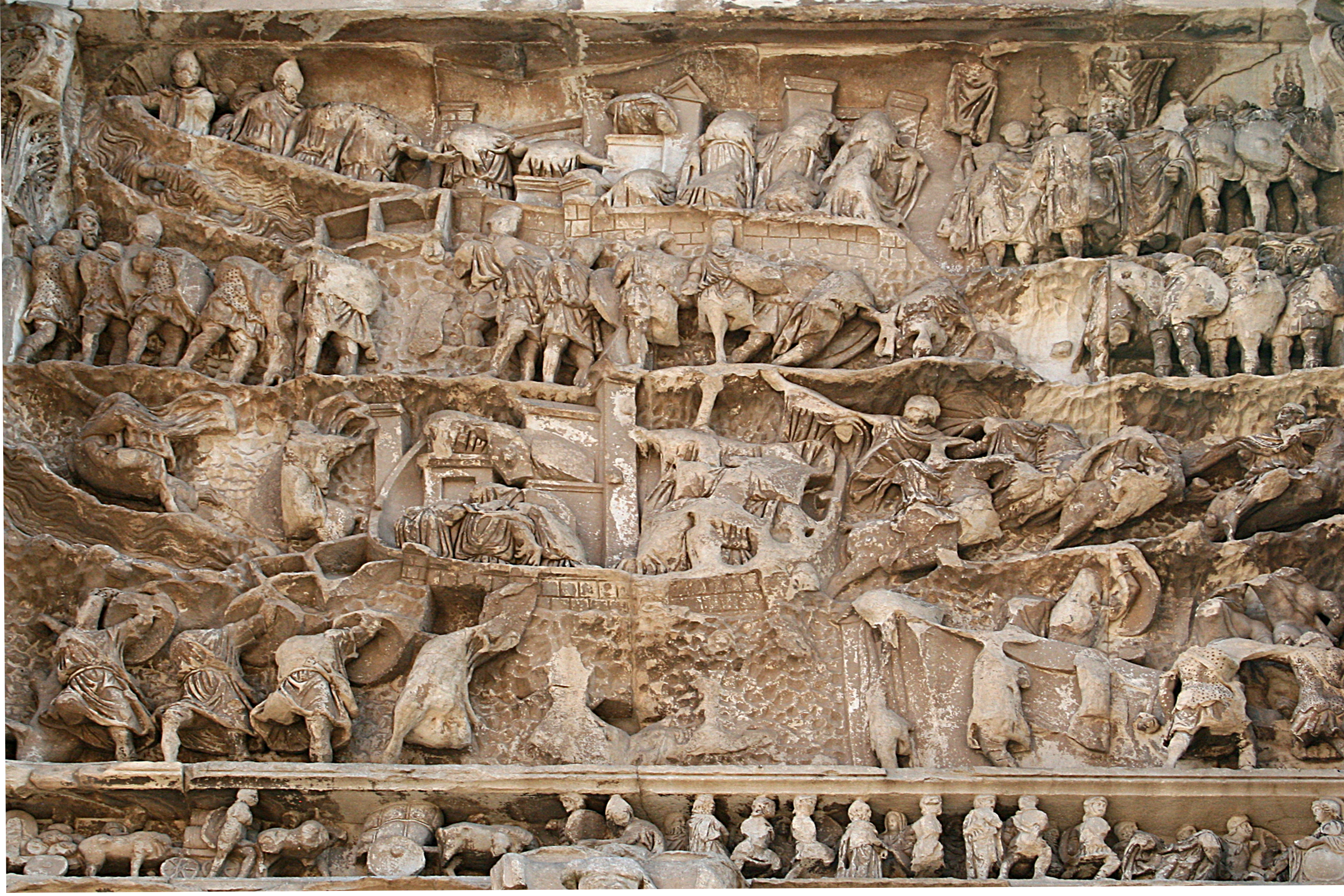
Reliefs of the war

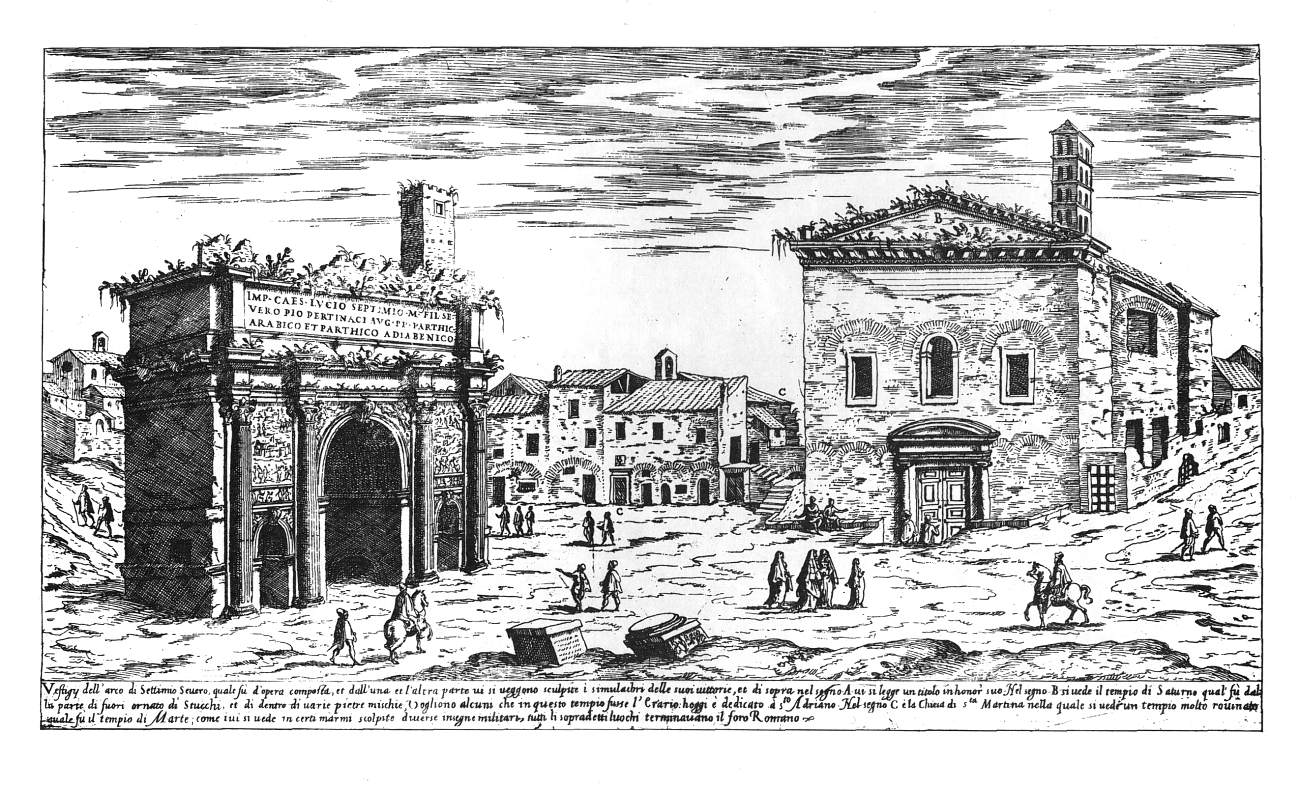
Arch of Septimus Severus with medieval fortification of 'Claustrum Cimini' including a tower still visible

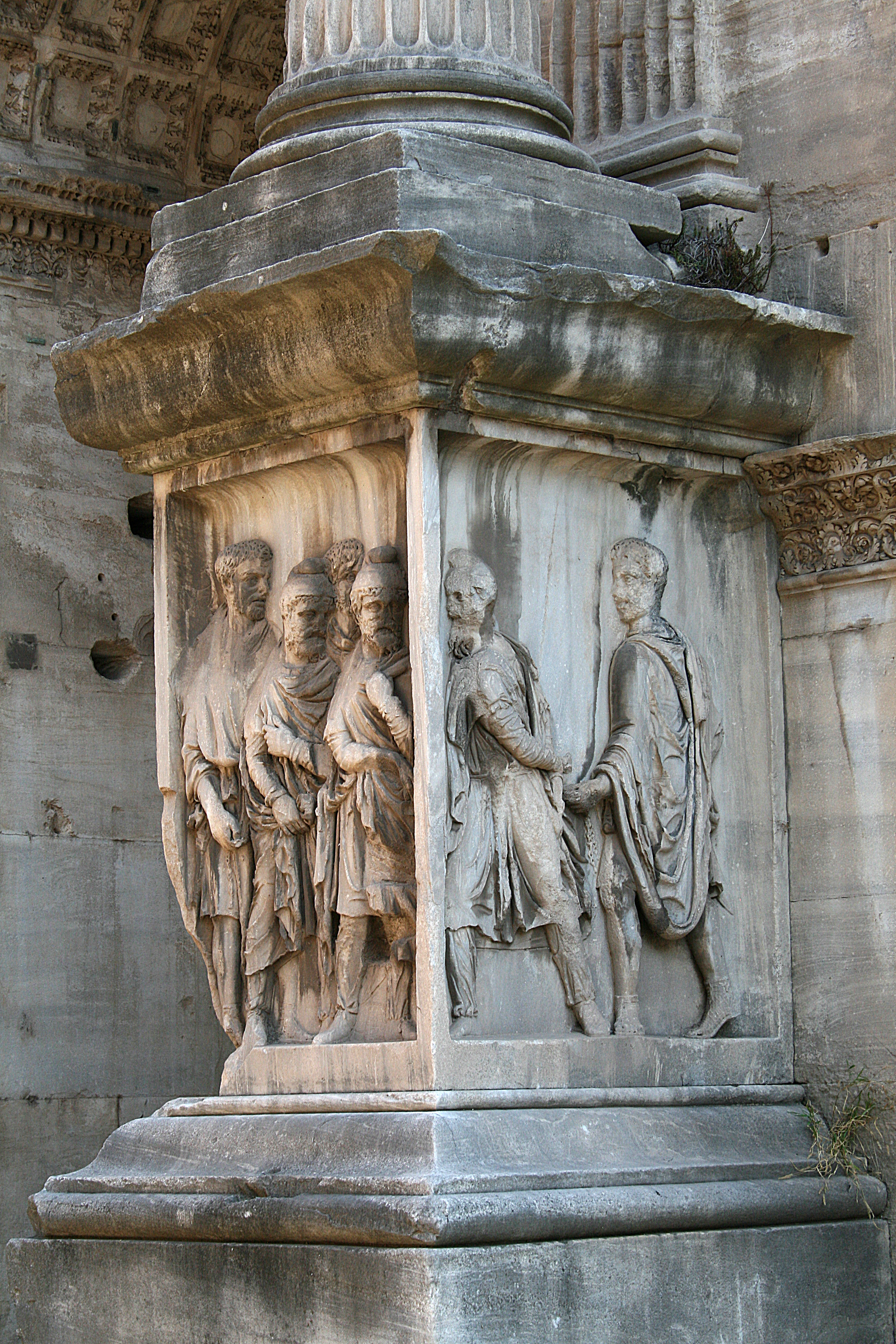
Plinths

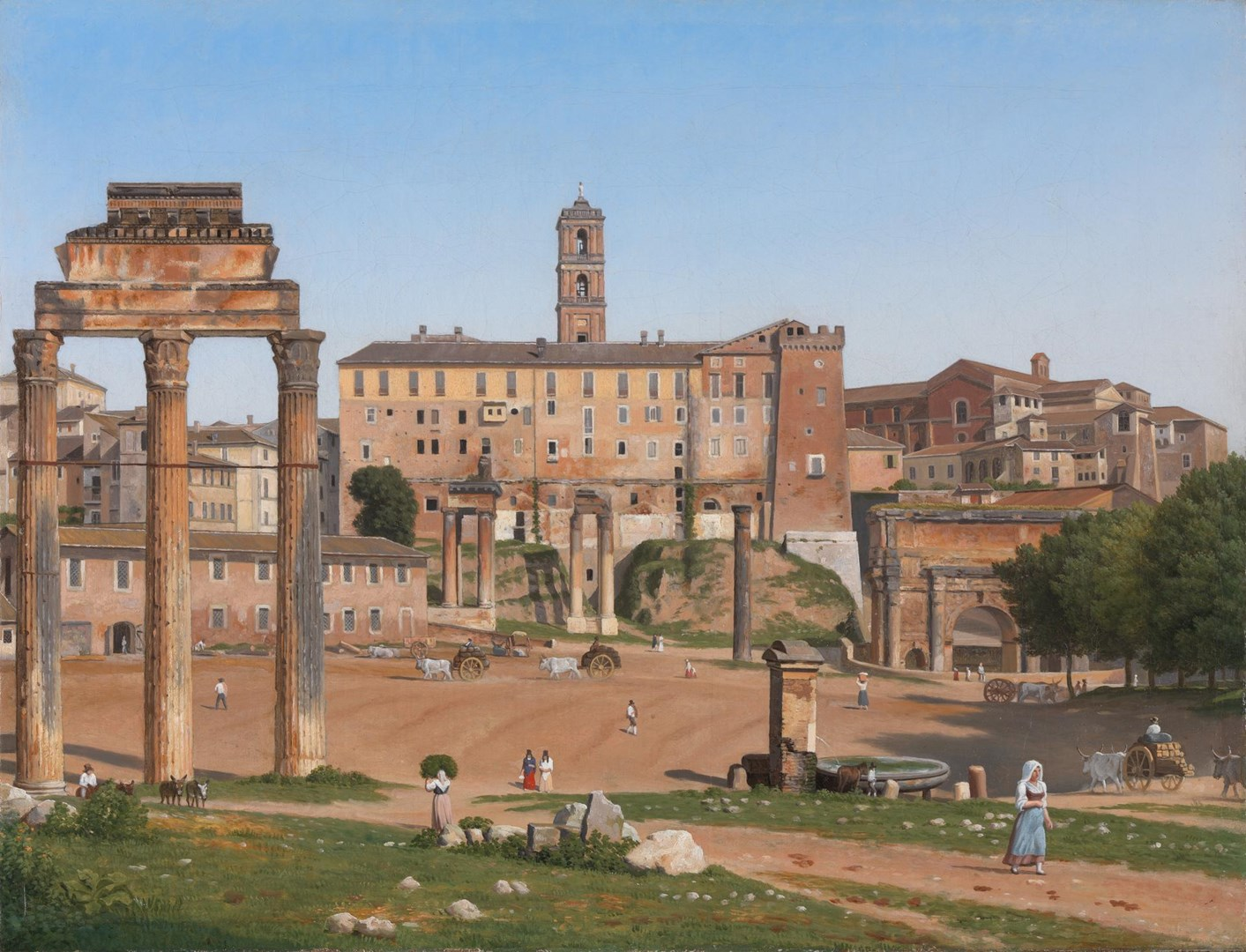
View of the Forum in Rome by Christoffer Wilhelm Eckersberg, 1814

== See also ==
- Arch of Titus – Ancient Roman arch, a landmark of Rome, Italy
- List of Roman triumphal arches
- List of ancient monuments in Rome

Preceded by Arch of Janus	Landmarks of Rome; Arch of Septimius Severus	Succeeded by Arch of Titus
