= View of the Forum in Rome =

Painting by Christoffer Wilhelm Eckersberg

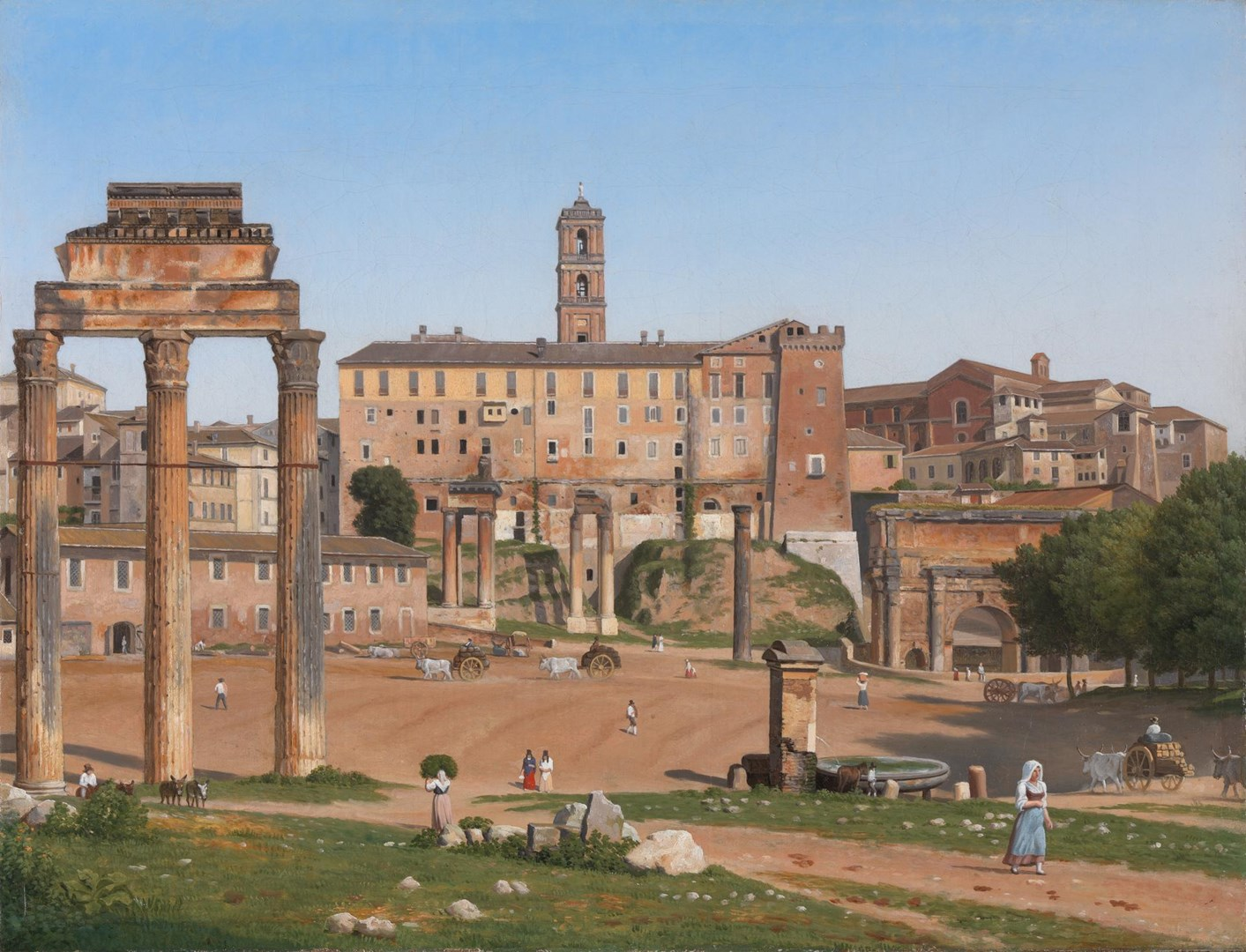
- Artist: Christoffer Wilhelm Eckersberg
- Year: 1814
- Type: Oil on canvas, landscape painting
- Dimensions: 32 cm × 41 cm (13 in × 16 in)
- Location: National Gallery; London

View of the Forum in Rome is an 1814 landscape painting by the Danish artist Christoffer Wilhelm Eckersberg. A veduta, it depicts the Trajan's Forum in Rome looking towards the Palazzo Senatorio on the Capitol. The complex, dating back to Ancient Rome, was still in the process of excavation at the time. In the left foreground are the remaining pillars of the Temple of Castor and Pollux. On the right is the Arch of Septimius Severus.

The artist would go on to be one of the pioneers of the Golden Age of Danish Art. Eckersberg produced the painting during his stay in Italy from 1813 to 1816. It combines elements of neoclassicism and realism, and was painted outdoors. Today it is in the collection of the National Gallery in London, having been acquired in 1992.

== Bibliography ==
- Boime, Albert. Art in an Age of Civil Struggle, 1848-1871. University of Chicago Press, 2008.
- Nielsen, Marjatta (ed.) The Classical Heritage in Nordic Art and Architecture. Museum Tusculanum Press, 1990.
- Salmon, Frank E. Building on Ruins: The Rediscovery of Rome and English Architecture. Ashgate, 2000.
