= Bust of Severus Alexander =

Bust of Roman emperor Severus Alexander

The Bust of Severus Alexander is a Roman marble sculpture of the emperor Severus Alexander aged around 18. Now in the Uffizi in Florence, it is 70 cm tall and is comparable with coins minted in 226.

== Sculpture style ==
It follows a new style of official imperial portraiture, characterised by the well-balanced volume of the head and the more psychological portrayal of the subject. His first official portrait, it may have been produced during its subject's second consulate (he wears the insignia of a consul) or more probably to mark his marriage to Sallustia Orbiana. His short hair also follows a new fashion and refers to his military career. The surface of hair and the very short beard are created with a few chisel strokes as in other busts of the time such as that of Severus' mother Julia Mamea. The expression is reminiscent of 'inspired' portraits in Hellenistic art, but in a more measured, less dramatic form.
