= Richard Brilliant =

American art historian (1929–2024)

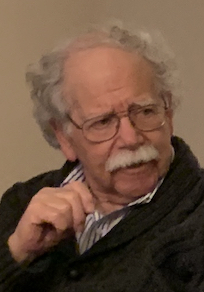
- Brilliant in 2023
- Born: November 20, 1929; Boston, Massachusetts, U.S.
- Died: August 8, 2024 (aged 94); New York City, U.S.
- Citizenship: United States
- Education: Boston Latin School; Yale College (BA, MA, PhD); Harvard Law School (LLB)
- Occupations: Art historian; university professor; writer
- Spouse: Eleanor Luria (m. 1952)
- Children: 4

Richard Brilliant (November 20, 1929 – August 8, 2024) was an American art historian, academic, and writer, who specialized in ancient Greek and Roman art focusing on overarching themes such as semiotics, portraiture, narrative, and historiography. He was a professor at Columbia University in New York City.

== Early life and education ==
Brilliant was born in Boston, Massachusetts, on November 20, 1929. He attended Boston Latin School (1941–1947), and graduated from Yale College in 1951 with a B.A. in classical civilization. He then attended Harvard Law School, receiving his LL.B. in 1954. He was admitted to the Massachusetts Bar the same year. He was awarded an M.A. in 1956, and a Ph.D. in 1960. Brilliant’s dissertation was titled as Gesture and Rank in Roman Art: The Use of Gestures to Denote Status in Roman Sculpture and Coinage and published in 1963.

== Career ==
Brilliant began his teaching career at the University of Pennsylvania in 1963. He became a full professor in 1969 and served as chairman of the art history department. He joined the faculty at Columbia University in 1970 as Professor of Art History and Archaeology, and he was later named the Anna S. Garbedian Professor in the Humanities.

From 1991 to 1994, Brilliant served as Editor-in-Chief of The Art Bulletin, the American academic journal of art history published by the College Art Association in the United States. Brilliant also served as the first director of the Italian Academy for Advanced Studies in America at Columbia University. Additionally, he occasionally served as a consultant to various media productions concerning Art History, and he appeared on screen in the Alexandria Production program Rome: Power and Glory for the Discovery Channel in December 1997.

He retired from full-time teaching at Columbia in 2004 and became Professor Emeritus.

== Honors and awards ==
Brilliant was awarded a Fulbright scholarship for study in Italy from 1957 to 1959 in order to complete his dissertation. He also received a Rome Prize from the American Academy in Rome for the period from 1960 to 1962. He was awarded a Guggenheim Fellowship in 1967 for his work on Roman imperial sculpture and coinage.

He was named Distinguished Scholar for 2005 by the College Art Association. In 2005, he was elected a member of the American Academy of Arts and Sciences for his contributions to the field of classical art, with the Academy saying Brilliant opened up the field "to new critical methods of historical and stylistic analysis.”

== Personal life and death ==
In 1951, just after graduating from Yale College, Brilliant married Eleanor Luria, a professor of social work at Rutgers University. They had four children, twelve grandchildren, and seven great-grandchildren.

Richard Brilliant died in New York City on August 8, 2024, at the age of 94.

== Selected bibliography ==
- Gesture and Rank in Roman Art: The Use of Gestures to Denote Status in Roman Sculpture and Coinage (Connecticut Academy of Arts & Sciences, 1963)
- The Arch of Septimius Severus in the Roman Forum (American Academy in Rome, 1967)
- Arts of the Ancient Greeks (New York: McGraw-Hill, 1973). ISBN 978-0-07-007850-5
- Roman Art from the Republic to Constantine (London: Phaidon, 1974). ISBN 978-0-7148-1596-1
- Pompeii A.D. 79: The Treasure of Rediscovery (New York: C.N. Potter, 1979). ISBN 978-0-517-53859-3
- Visual Narratives: Storytelling in Etruscan and Roman Art (Ithaca: Cornell University Press, 1984). ISBN 978-0-8014-1558-6
- Portraiture (Cambridge: Harvard University Press, 1991). ISBN 978-0-674-69175-9
- Commentaries on Roman Art: Selected Studies (London: Pindar Press, 1994) ISBN 978-0-907132-74-5
- My Laocoon: Alternative Claims in the Interpretation of Artworks California Studies in the History of Art. Discovery series 8. (Berkeley: University of California Press, 2000). ISBN 978-0-520-21682-2
- Un Americano a Roma: Riflessioni sull-arte Romana (Rome: Di Renzo, 2000). ISBN 978-88-8323-016-5
- Death—From Dust to Destiny (London: Reaktion, 2017). ISBN 978-1-78023-725-1
