= Qirnada =

Qirnada قرنادة Ghernada
- Town
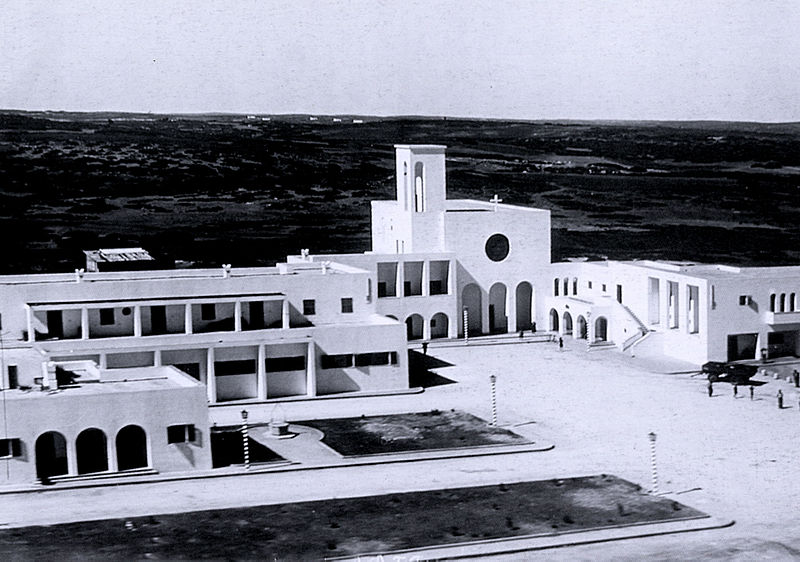

- Location in Libya
- Coordinates: 32°43′48″N 21°54′22″E
- Country: Libya
- Region: Cyrenaica
- District: Jabal al Akhdar

Population (2006)
  - Total: 3,415
- Time zone: UTC + 2

Qirnada or Ghirnada (Arabic: قرنادة) is a town in the District of Jabal al Akhdar in north-eastern Libya. It is located 20 km south of Bayda.

During Italian colonization it was named Battisti after Italian patriot and irredentism martyr Cesare Battisti. It was designed by Italian architect Florestano Di Fausto.
