= El Bayyada =

El Bayyada البيّاضة
- Town
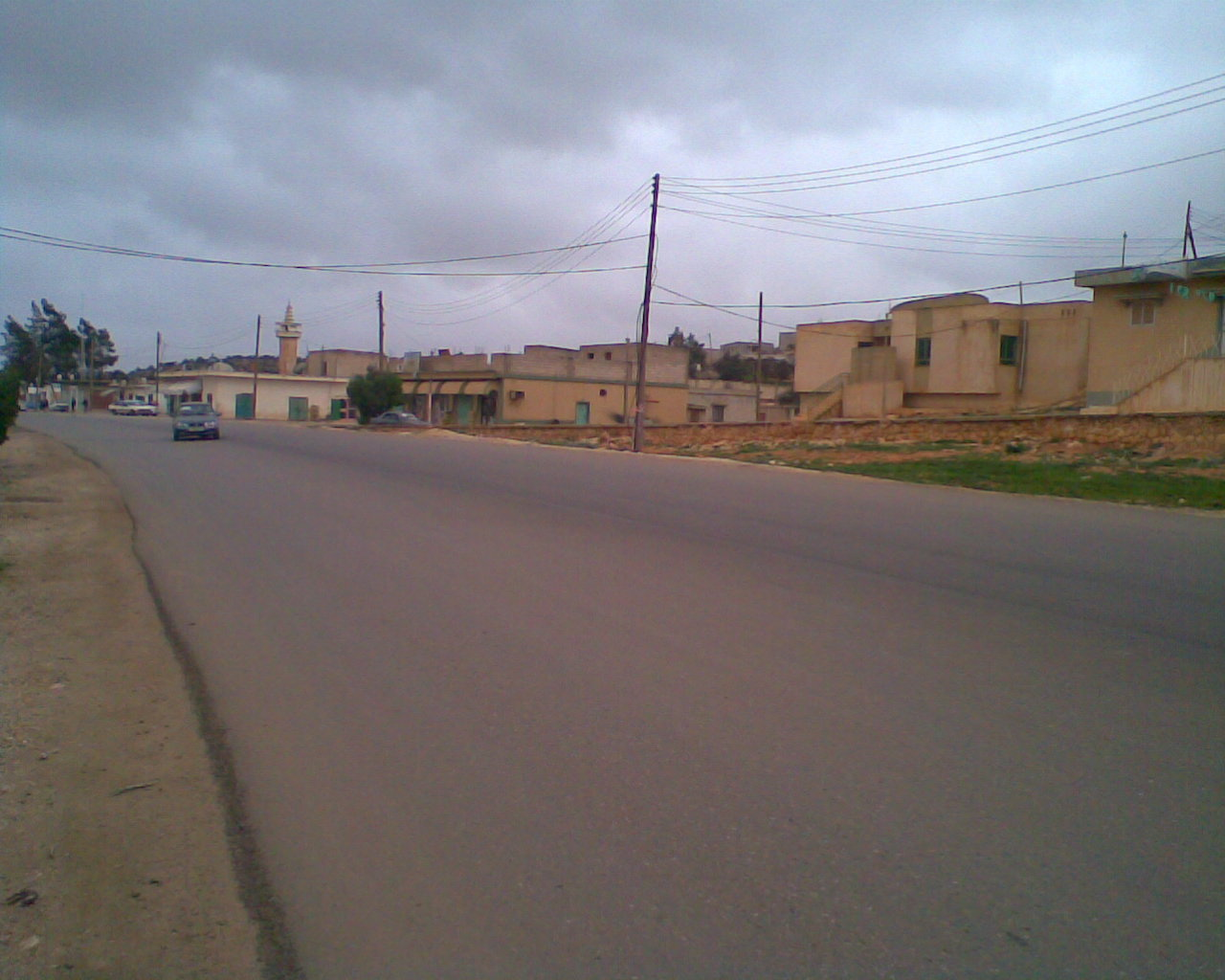

- Location in Libya
- Coordinates: 32°33′43″N 21°15′10″E
- Country: Libya
- Region: Cyrenaica
- District: Marj
- Established: 1938

Population (2006)
  - Total: 7,432
- Time zone: UTC+2 (EET)

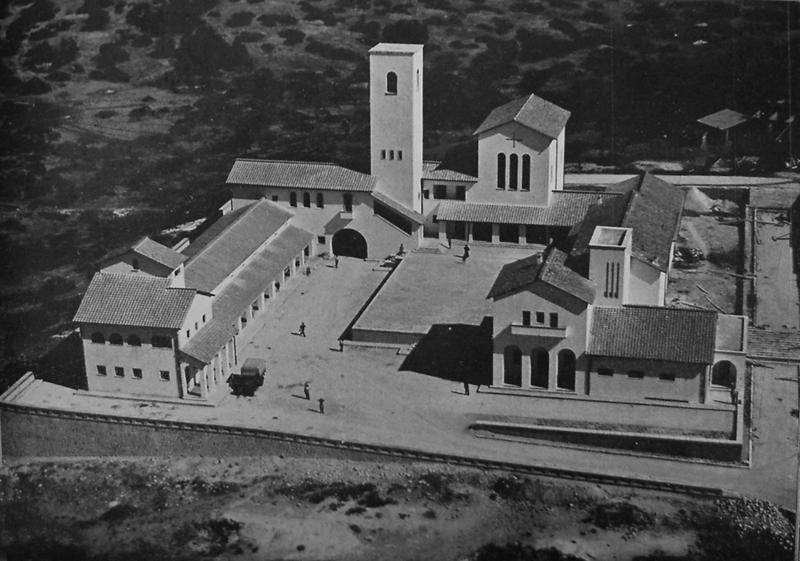
The village in 1938

El Bayyada is a town in the Jebel Akhdar region of Libya. It is located 140 km (87 mi) east of Benghazi and 60 km (37 mi) west of Bayda.

El Bayyada was founded in 1938, under the Italian rule, as one of the rural villages which had to be populated by Italian colonists. It was named Villaggio D'Annunzio after the well-known Italian poet Gabriele d'Annunzio, and was designed by Italian architect Florestano Di Fausto.
