= Florestano Di Fausto =

Italian architect, engineer and politician

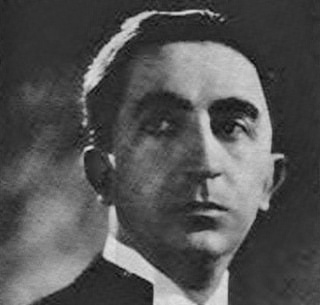
- Florestano Di Fausto (c. 1930)
- Born: 16 July 1890; Rocca Canterano, Rome, Italy
- Died: 11 January 1965 (aged 74); Rome, Italy
- Education: Accademia di Belle Arti, Rome; Sapienza University of Rome, Rome
- Occupation: Architect

Florestano Di Fausto (16 July 1890 – 11 January 1965) was an Italian architect, engineer and politician who is best known for his building designs in the Italian overseas territories around the Mediterranean. He is considered the most important colonial architect of the Fascist age in Italy and has been described as the "architect of the Mediterranean". Uncontested protagonist of the architectural scene first in the Italian Islands of the Aegean and then in Italian Libya, he was gifted with a remarkable preparation combined with consummate skills, which allowed him to master and to use indifferently and in any geographical context the most diverse architectural styles, swinging between eclecticism and rationalism. His legacy, long neglected, has been highlighted since the 1990s.

== Early life and career ==
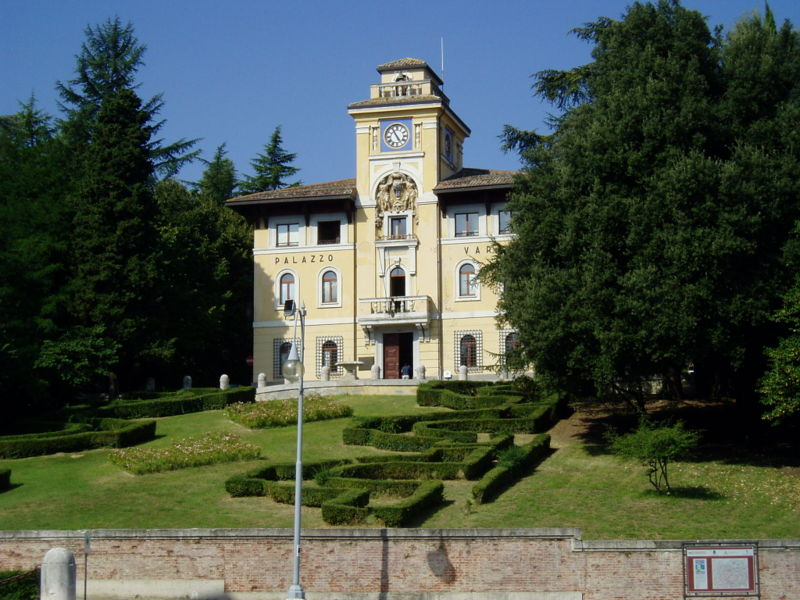
Palazzo Varano in Predappio, one of the first works of Di Fausto

Born in Rocca Canterano, a town near Rome, Florestano Di Fausto studied in Rome, first getting the Laurea in Architecture at the Accademia di belle Arti, and then (1922) in civil Engineering. His first work, from 1916 to 1923, was the architectural part of the tomb of Pope Pius X in St. Peter's Basilica in the Vatican, a work correct but cold. It was followed by the design of the Calvary and of the chapel of relics of Passover in the Roman basilica of Santa Croce in Gerusalemme, inaugurated in 1930 but finished only in 1952. From 1924 until 1932 he was a technical consultant of the Ministry of Foreign Affairs (MAE), erecting, modifying or restructuring a great number of Italian embassies, legations, consulates, culture institutes and schools in Europe, Africa and the Americas. His most important works in this respect are the Italian embassies in Belgrade and Ankara, and the legation in Cairo, where he collaborated with Melchiorre Bega, one of the most important Italian interior architects of the 20th century. At the same time, he became known for proposing several projects for the center of Rome, as those for the Piazze Colonna and del Parlamento, for the Lungotevere Marzio and for the new seat of the Banca Nazionale del Lavoro in Via Veneto, but all of them remained on paper. Between 1926 and 1928 Di Fausto, who had good connections with Benito Mussolini, designed the city plan and the main buildings of Predappio Nuova. The Italian dictator had decided to move his hometown, Predappio, after a landslide that was menacing its survival. The idea behind the work of Di Fausto here was the creation of an idealized country village, through an "urban design of devotional kind", in accordance with the many pilgrims visiting each day the birthplace of the "Duce", but in harmony with Mussolini's ideal of a rural Italy and his will to show his modest and simple roots. The affordable houses for the inhabitants displaced by the landslide, the renovation of Palazzo Varano, the post office building, the Food Market, the Santa Rosa primary school and kindergarten, the doctors' house, the expansion of the cemetery of San Cassiano and the homonymous church and the tomb of the Mussolini family constitute the stages of his work in Predappio.

== Rhodes and the Dodecanese ==
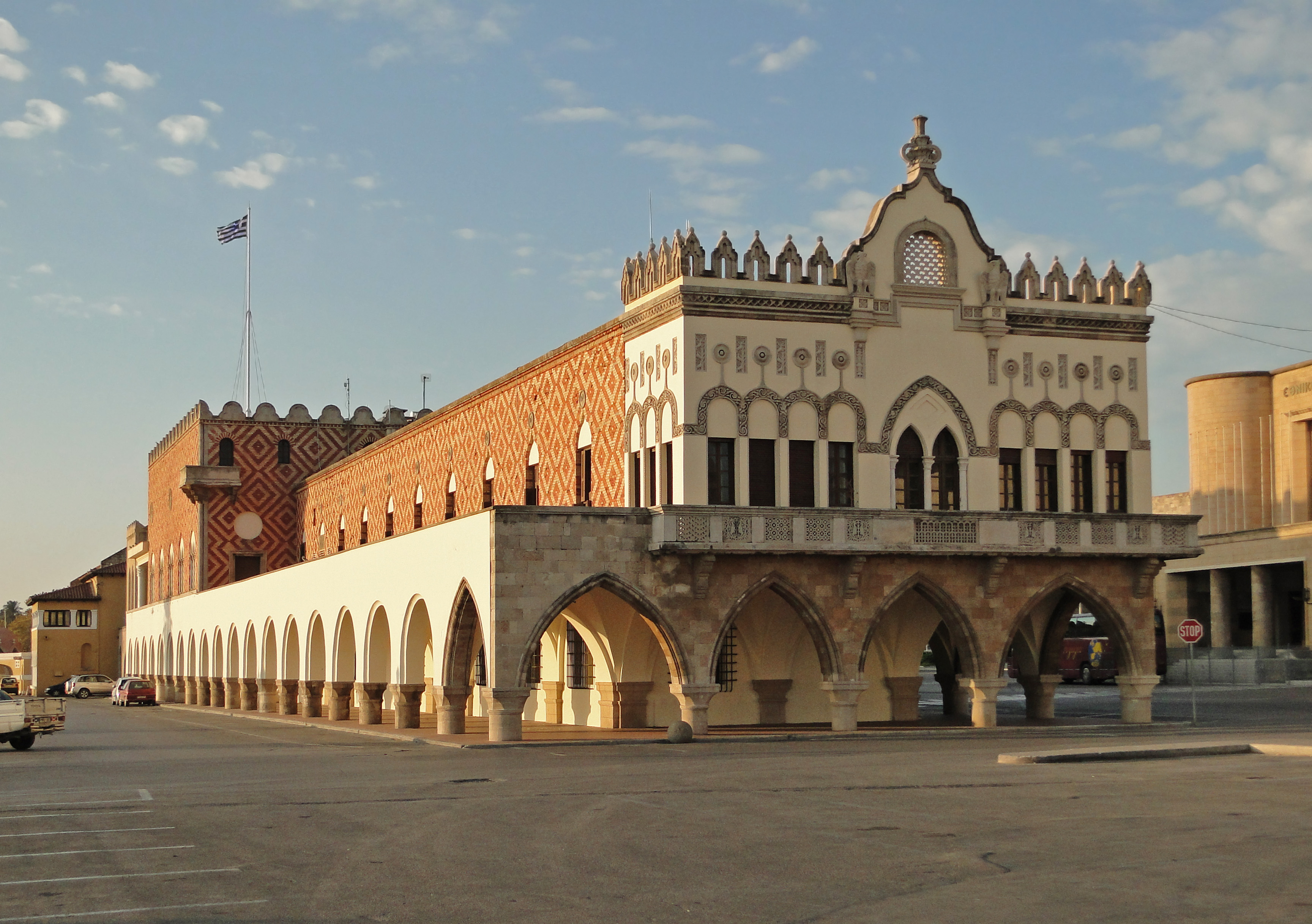
Palazzo del Governo (today the offices of the Prefecture of the Dodecanese) in Rhodes, built in 1926.

In 1923, Di Fausto started to work for the governor of the Italian Islands of the Aegean, Mario Lago. This was a liberal and far-sighted diplomat, the first civilian governor of the islands after their occupation in 1912 during the Italo-Turkish War, who favored the peaceful coexistence among the different ethnic groups of the islands: Greeks, Turks, Ladinos and, since 1912, Italians. His first work in Rhodes was the city plan, finished on 29 January 1926: he chose to retain almost totally the medieval walled city, isolating the ancient walls and introducing respect zones, and reused paths and alignments of the ancient plan by Hippodamus of Miletus for the new quarters. The new city was erected outside the walls, south of the west bank of the Mandraki harbour, and was conceived as a garden city, an urban model which was highly fashionable in Italy in those years. The main road of the new town, south of the Mandraki, was christened Foro Italico, and there Di Fausto designed the main buildings, preferring an eclectic style mixing Byzantine, Ottoman, Roman Renaissance, Venetian, Knight Chivalric and local elements. This style was well suited for the multi-ethnic population of the island. The most important works among the many which he designed in Rhodes city are: the Palazzo del Governo (today the prefecture building) built in 1926, in Venetian Gothic style, with a white and pink stone façade, resembling the Doge's Palace in Venice; the neo-Renaissance post office building of 1927; the Catholic cathedral of Saint John of the Knights (now Evangelismos Greek orthodox church), rebuilt among great quarrels in 1924–25, whose plans were reconstructed using engravings of the Church of St John of the Collachium, located within the walled city and destroyed in 1856; the Grande Albergo delle Rose, now Casino Rhodos, built with Michele Platania, but "cleansed" of all its deco embellishments in the late 1930s by Governor Cesare Maria de Vecchi; above all, the Mercato nuovo (Nea Agora, "New Market"), the center of the new city, an irregular polygonal structure enclosing the fishmongers pavilion, which possesses an unquestionable Oriental style. Besides Rhodes, Di Fausto was active also in Kos, where his most important works are the Palazzo del Governo (1927–29) and the Catholic church of the Agnus Dei (1927), built with Rodolfo Petracco, with central plan and a bell tower tapered on the façade, considered his best work in the Dodecanese; in Kastellorizo, where he erected the Delegate's Building; in Kalymnos and Leros. Since 1926 ever increasing differences of opinion with the governor pushed him to gradually abandon his commitments in the Aegean. The quarrel ended in 1927 with a legal dispute, where Di Fausto showed that during his service in the Dodecanese he had designed no less than fifty buildings—houses, public buildings, churches, barracks, markets, schools—thirty two of them already built or in construction in 1927. To keep this high pace of work, the architect worked also during his frequent boat trips between Italy and Rhodes.

== Works in Italy and Albania ==
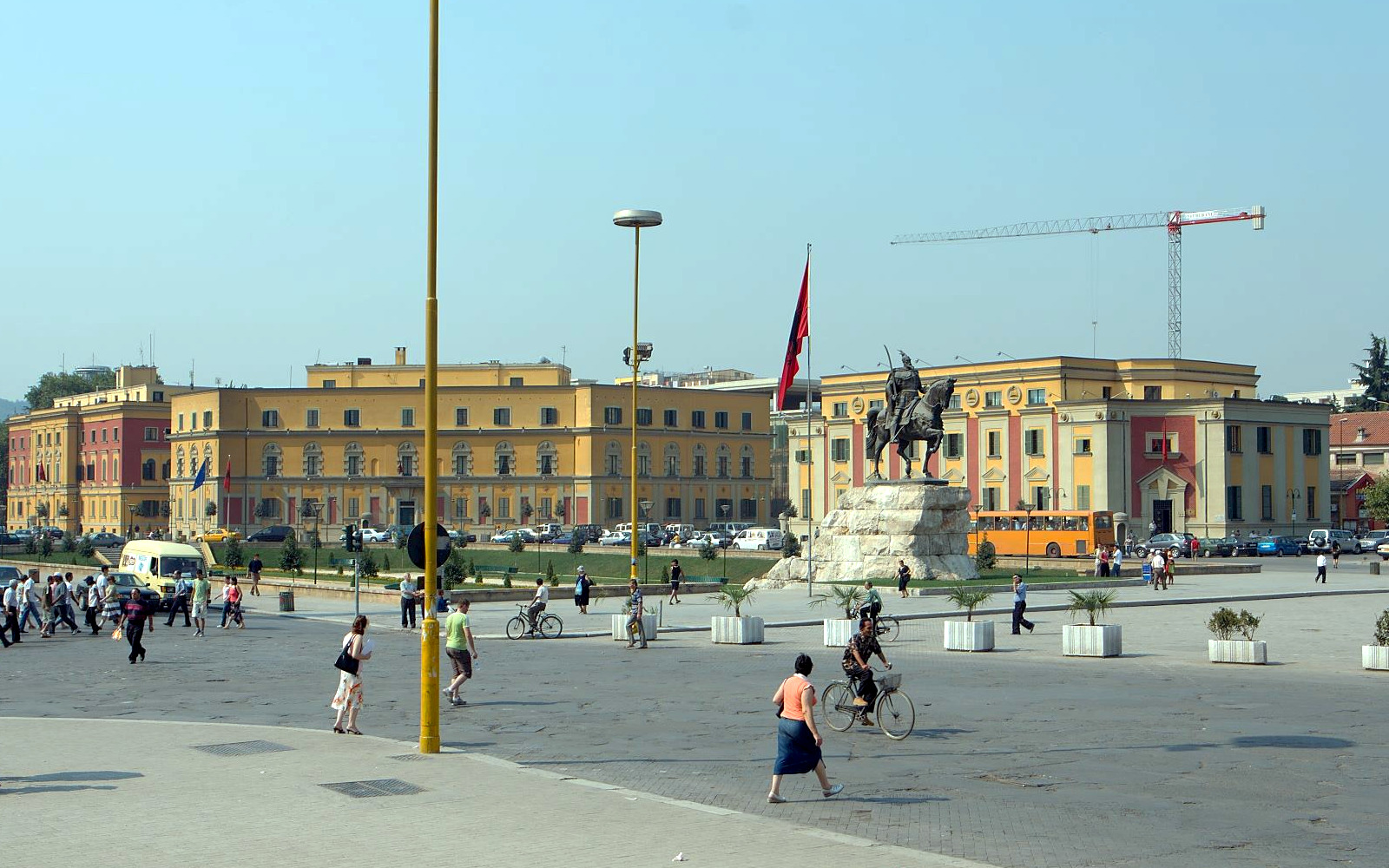
Di Fausto's buildings in Skanderbeg Square, Tirana

At the same time Di Fausto, whose prolificity was impressive, was continuing also his work in Italy, above all in Rome—where he owned a thriving studio—and surrounding regions, where, in the second half of the twenties, he designed several housing complexes: among them, those for the civil servants of the MAE, in Via delle tre Madonne, characterized by its Roman barocchetto style. In 1926–28 he designed on the hill of Montelarice near Loreto the villa of the famous tenor Beniamino Gigli, a pretentious and luxurious mansion, whose interest lies in its plan with a central body and two tilted lower wings, a concept that Di Fausto would re-use several times in the future. On 21 February 1930 he had a bad airplane accident in the northern Tyrrhenian Sea, being rescued together with his crew after 12 hours by the ship Citta' di Tripoli. In the thirties, his most important works in Italy were the Centrale del latte (dairy plant) in Pescara (1932), where Di Fausto abandoned his eclecticism in favor of a clean functionalism, the Casa del contadino ("Peasant house") in the new city of Littoria (today's Latina) and the military sanatorium in Anzio (1930–33). The latter complex, placed in scenic position in a pine wood in front of the sea and near the ruins of the Villa of Nero, is a good example of Italian rationalism. Here is particularly noteworthy the chirurgic tuberculosis pavilion, with a central body containing the operation room, whose semicircular outer wall is a single glass façade. From this body diverge two long angled wings which host the patients. The Peasant house in Latina, with a central tower and strutting wings, was demolished in the sixties. The dairy in Pescara, also demolished ın 2010 amidst much controversy and legal fights, was a three-body building upholstered with Clinker, whose central body façade had a treble glass wall. The last two buildings were commissioned by the agriculture ministry, which gave to the architect several other works, like the organization of the national exhibition of wheat, reclamations and fruit picking, held in Villa Borghese in 1932, and the design of the main seat of the Fascist Agricultural Worker Union (C.F.L.A.), in Corso d'Italia, Rome, in 1936–37. In that case, Di Fausto radically altered a pre-existing edifice, transforming it in a typical stile littorio building. between 1937 and 1939 he erected in Via Agri, Rome, the Villino Staccioli, a classical example of Italian rationalism. The Stacciolis, a family from the Abruzzi, were the owners of a building company which executed many among the architect's works in Italy and abroad.

In the same period, he was active also in Albania (at that time practically an Italian protectorate), where he replaced Armando Brasini. There he designed the new city plan for Tirana, with the city center and the monumental department buildings around Skanderbeg Square, in Neo-Renaissance style with articulate angular solutions and giant order fascias (1932). In the same years he designed also the Royal Villa of Durrës (1928–30), with a central tower and two wings, and the royal villa at Scutari (1928), both works being commissioned by King Zog I.

== Libya ==
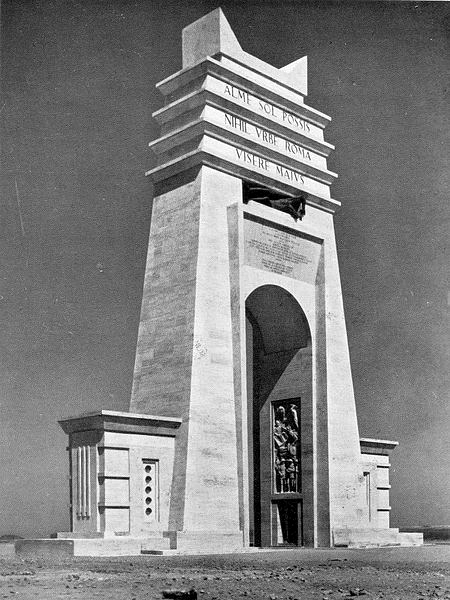
The Arch of the Philaeni in March 1937

In 1932, Di Fausto became "consultant for architecture" of the city of Tripoli, the capital of Italian Libya, beginning the last creative phase of his professional life. In 1934, the replacement of Pietro Badoglio with Italo Balbo, the brilliant and impetuous Ras of Ferrara and Maresciallo dell'Aria, as Governor-General of Libya, boosted his work. The two men soon came to understand each other well (Balbo was so confident in Di Fausto to give him in 1938 the task of designing the city plan of his home town's center), and Di Fausto, nominated by Balbo chef of the "Commission for Urban Protection and Esthetics", with the main task of designing Tripoli's city plan, started to produce a stream of projects for Libya's capital: there the architect outlined the plan of Piazza Castello (the area around the Red Castle) and of the square around the Arch of Marcus Aurelius, in the Medina. Moreover, he erected public buildings, churches, markets, hotels, totaling fifteen works in few years. His masterpiece in Tripoli is the multifunctional center Al Waddan (hotel, swimming pools, casino, theater), characterized by a long row of arches parallel to today's Sharia al Fatah promenade. On 15 March 1937, with a lavish night ceremony in the presence of Mussolini, the Arch of the Philaeni near Ra's Lanuf was inaugurated, marking the border between Tripolitania and Cyrenaica along the newly built Via Balbia (today's Libyan Coastal Highway). In all these works, the architect resumed his Greek experience, mixing with great virtuosity arabisant and novecento elements.

Until the outbreak of World War II, Di Fausto extended his activity all over Libya, building hotels in pre-desertic towns as Jefren and Nalut, residences for officers in Tobruk, Menina and Castel Benito, various typologies of buildings in Benghazi, Misrata and Derna, and eight out of thirty-two rural villages, foundation towns for Italian colonists. In all these works Di Fausto displayed his professional maturity, mastering the design of the most different types of buildings and design scales. The peak of his African work was the design of the Libyan pavilion at the Mostra delle terre Italiane d'oltremare ("Exhibition of the Italian overseas territories") held in Naples in 1940. His position as Balbo's "court architect" was sealed by the placement of his portrait near the Governor's in the frescoes painted by the Ferrarese Achille Funi on the vaults of the Church of Saint Francis in Tripoli, another work of him.

In 1940, Di Fausto took also a short detour from his main activity, designing the scenography of the historic movie The King's Jester (Italian: Il re si diverte), directed by Mario Bonnard.

== Final years ==
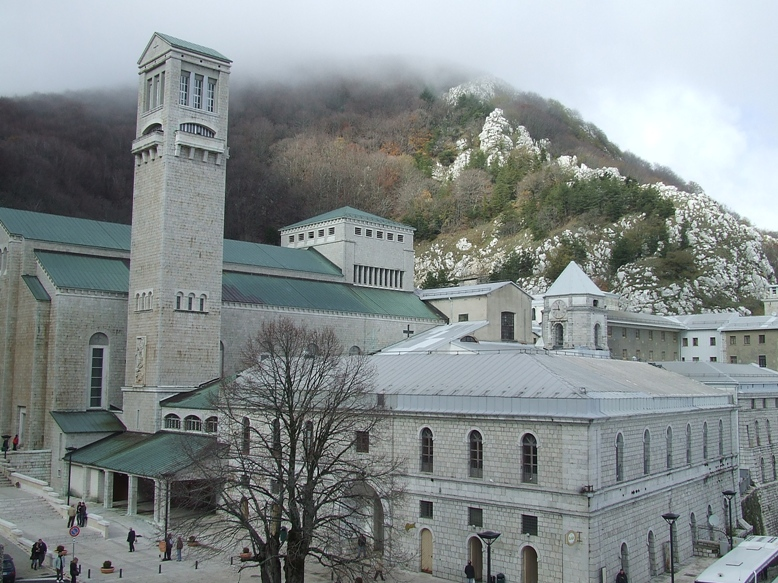
The Sanctuary of Montevergine, completed after Di Fausto's death

During the war years, Di Fausto abandoned his fascist position approaching the Azione Cattolica, until at the end of the war he was elected representative for the Democrazia Cristiana both in the Constituent Assembly and in the first Legislature. In 1953 he left his party for the Monarchist National Party. During these years, he condemned current architectural developments. In a speech in parliament about the Venice Biennale of Architecture he defined Italy's banal cosmopolitan architecture after the war as "an insane desire of new things" and said that abstractism, existentialism and relativism were "manifestations of putrid matter". His most noteworthy works during those years were the plan for the post-war reconstruction of Subiaco, the restoration of the cathedral of Sant'Andrea Apostolo of the same town, the design of the General House of the Cistercians on the Aventine Hill in Rome, and the restructuring of the Sanctuary of Montevergine, built in an arid neo-Romanesque style. Finished in 1966, the complex shows a return to the traditionalism of his early days. Di Fausto died in Rome in 1965. He was member of the Accademia di San Luca and of the Pontifical Academy of Fine Arts and Letters of the Virtuosi al Pantheon.

== Legacy ==
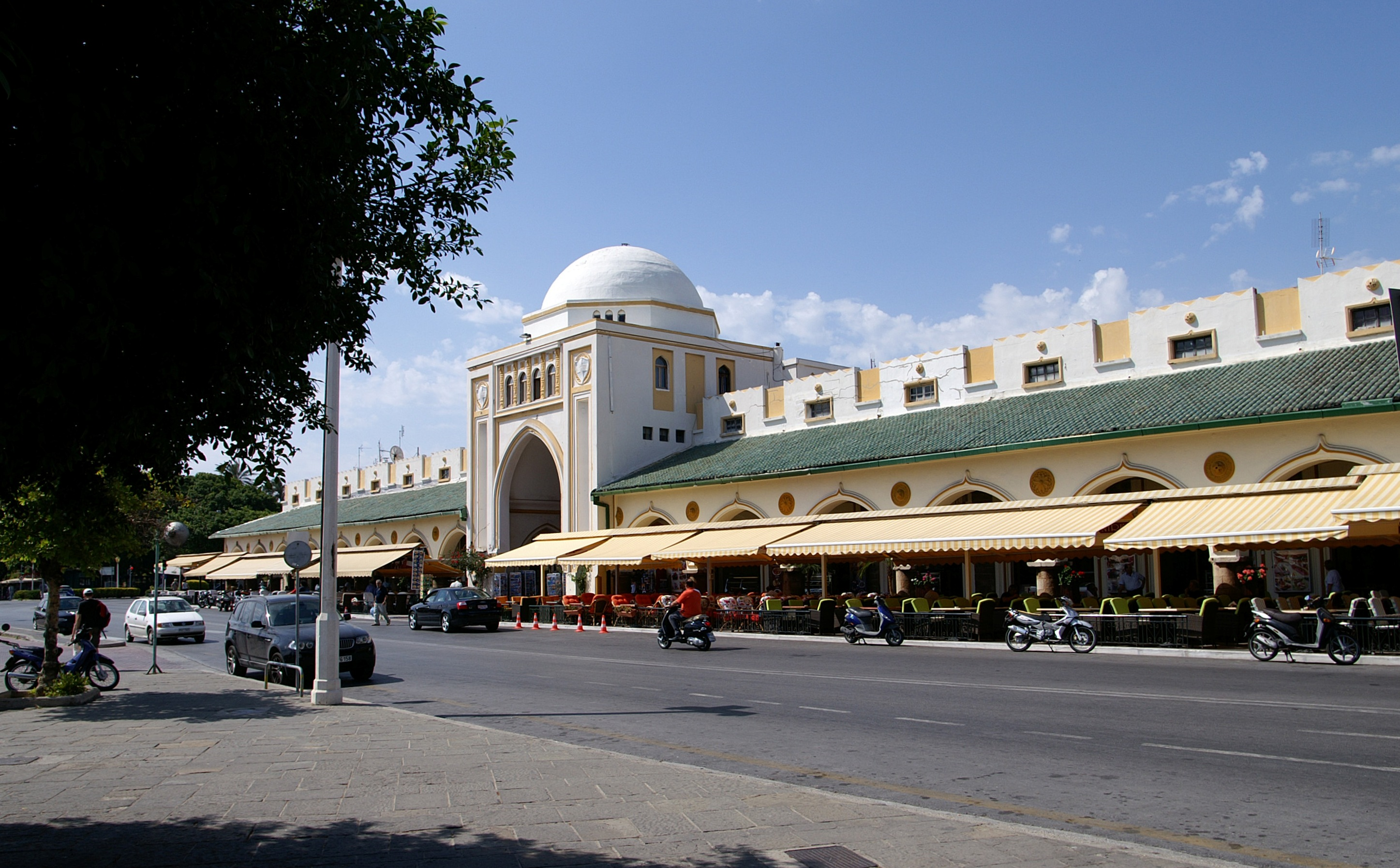
View of the Mercato Nuovo (Nea Agora) at the port of Mandraki, the center of the new Italian Rhodes.

Florestano Di Fausto was the most important Italian colonial architect of the Fascist regime. In the 1920s, a group of young architects, most of them rationalists, found inspiration for their works in Mediterranean architecture. They reevaluated the traditional buildings ("architecture without architects") of southern Italy, the Greek Islands and the North African coast, since they thought that right in those places nestled the sources of architectural rationality. This new concept, the mediterraneità (mediterraneity), was born in the rationalist movement, but later also other groupings, like the "Neoclassicists", took possession of it. The mediterraneità, which in a first phase was connected by the rationalists with Hellenic architecture, with its purity of lines and design, was later used by Fascist propaganda as ideological justification for its Mediterranean expansion, and was coupled with the Roman architecture.

In this context Di Fausto, who was not a rationalist, laid hands on this concept. In his only writing, published in 1937, he states: "Architecture was born in the Mediterranean and triumphed in Rome in the eternal monuments created from the genius of our birth: it must, therefore, remain Mediterranean and Italian." His talent and his political connections allowed him to put this theorization into practice. Thanks to his many works in Albania, Libya, the Italian Aegean Islands and Italy itself, it has been defined "Architect of the Mediterranean" per antonomasia. His adhesion to the concept of mediterraneità is also reflected by his steady necessity to come in contact with the Genius Loci of the places where he was going to operate: he wrote, in the same writing cited above: "Not a single stone was placed by me without having filled myself in advance with the spirit of the place, so as to make it my own".

His work resulted in a continuous balancing between traditional and modern architecture, eclecticism and rationalism. He was "an unsurpassed model of professional architect who, thanks to a remarkable preparation combined with consummate skills, was able to master, and to use indifferently, and in any geographical context, each possible style: from Moorish to Venetian Gothic, from Renaissance to Novecento, reducing even the rationalist language to another Modern Style." Due to his steadily swinging between traditional and modern styles, he was unremittingly attacked by the two opposite fronts of colonialist architects, the "neoclassicists" and rationalists. His work, long neglected after the war, has been rediscovered since the 1990s, and since then his legacy has more and more become the object of study, although a general catalog of his works is still missing.

Selected works
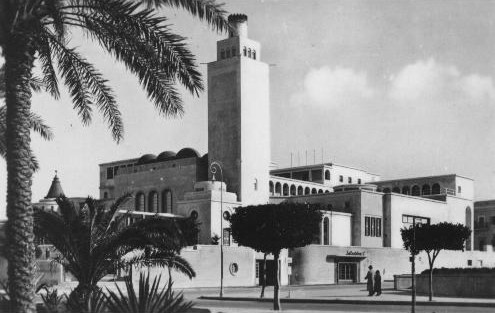
Al Waddan Center, Tripoli in the 1950s

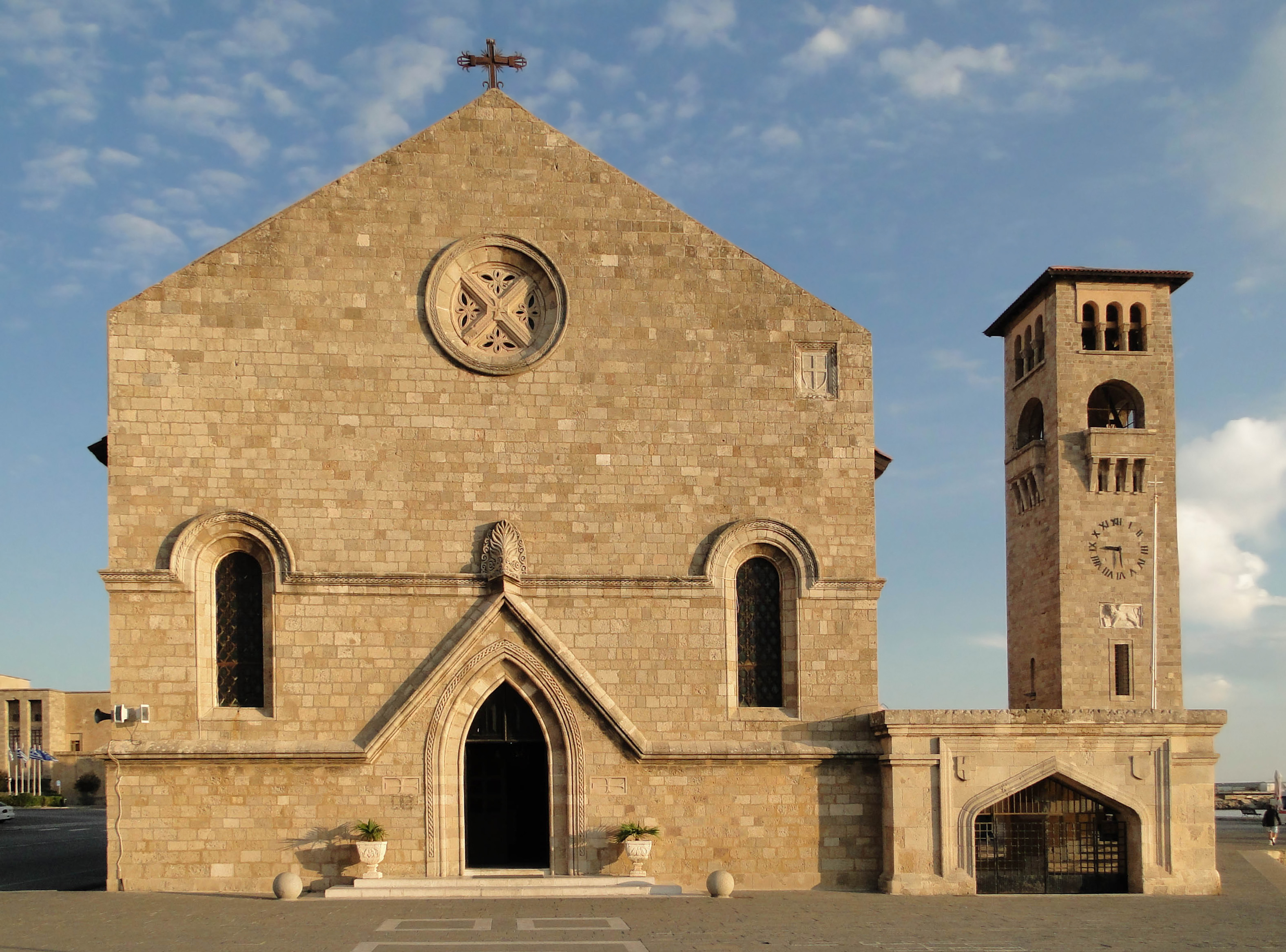
Evangelismos church (former San Giovanni) at the Mandraki, Rhodes

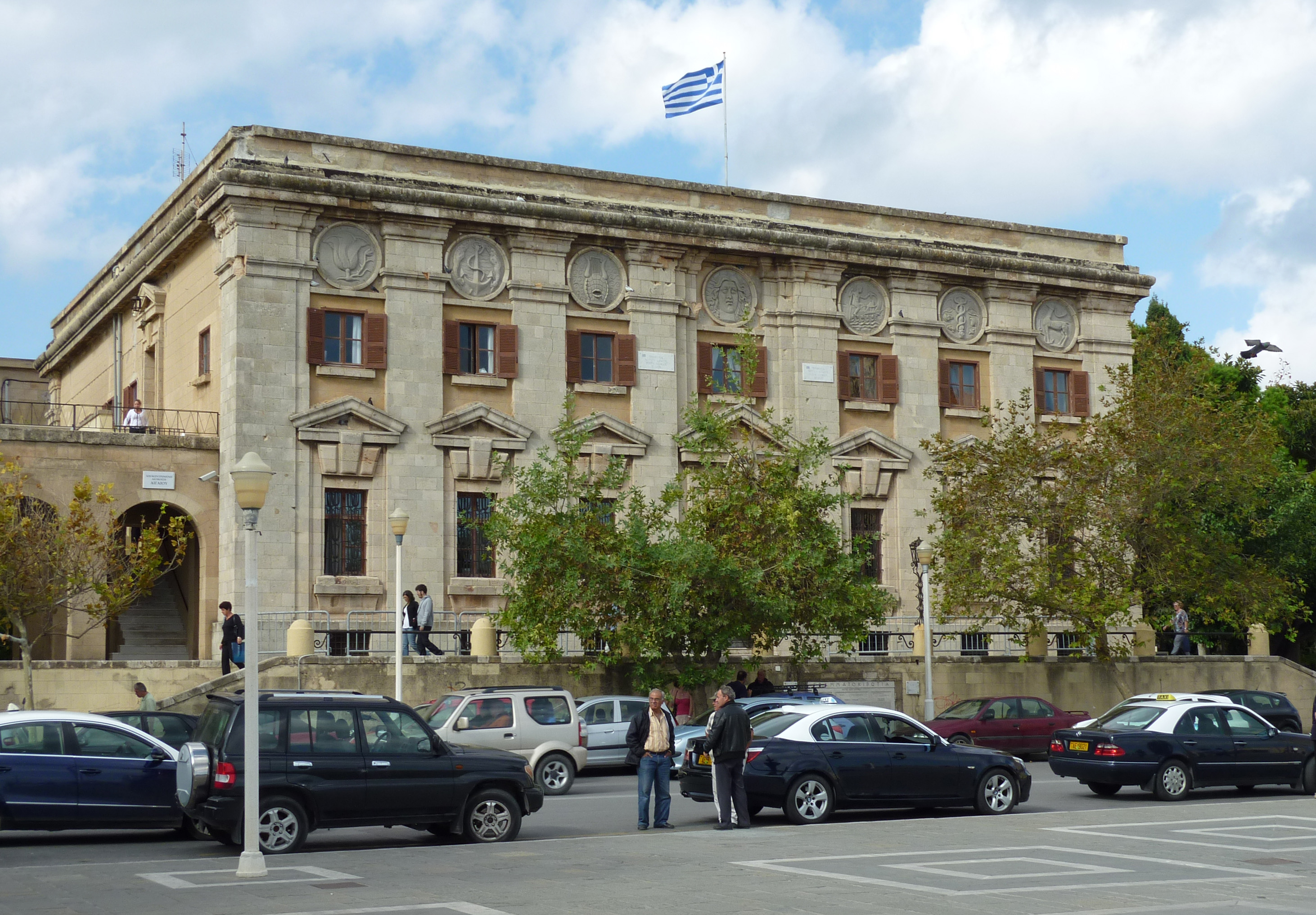
Main post office, Rhodes

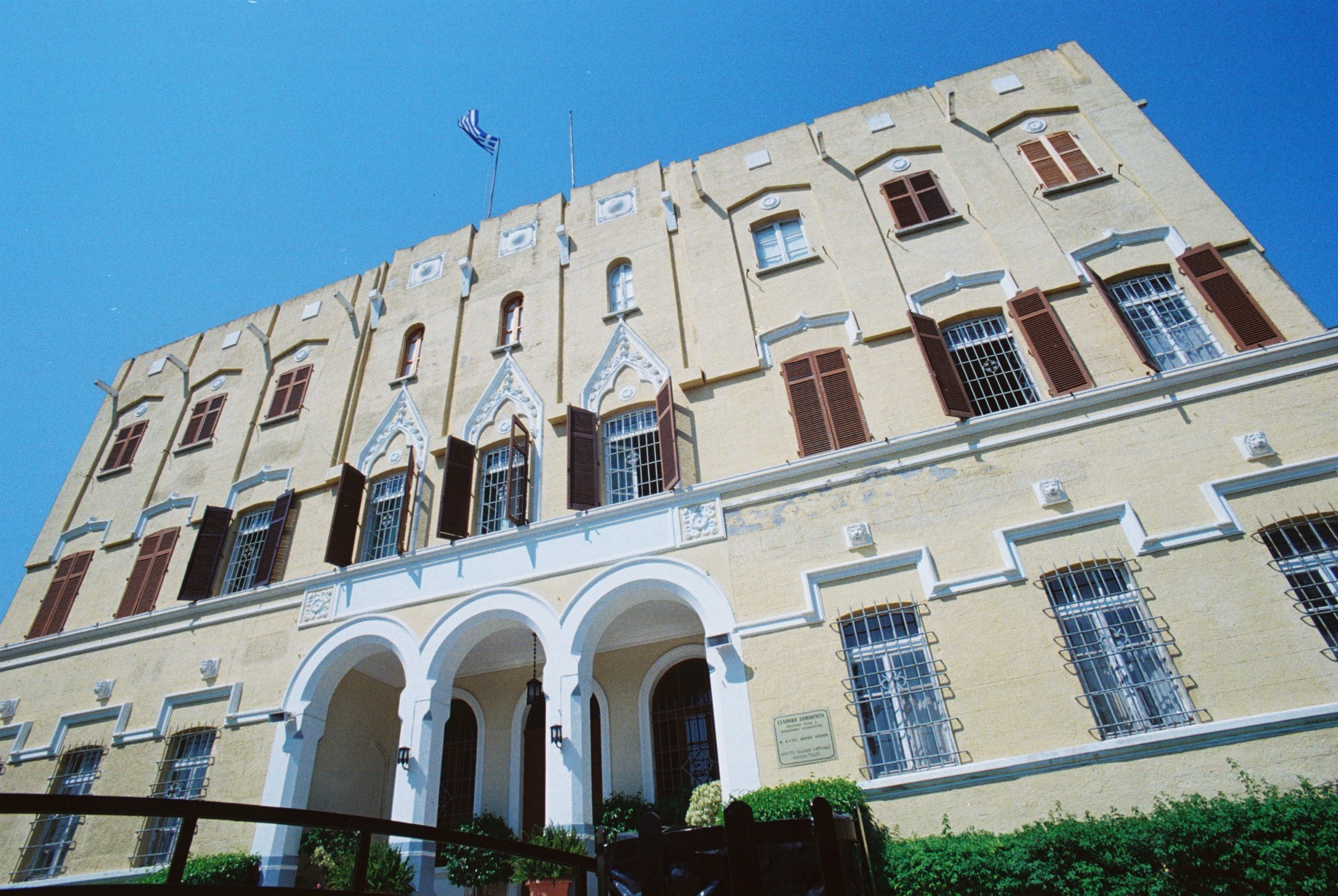
Girls' School, Rhodes, built with Andrea Torasso

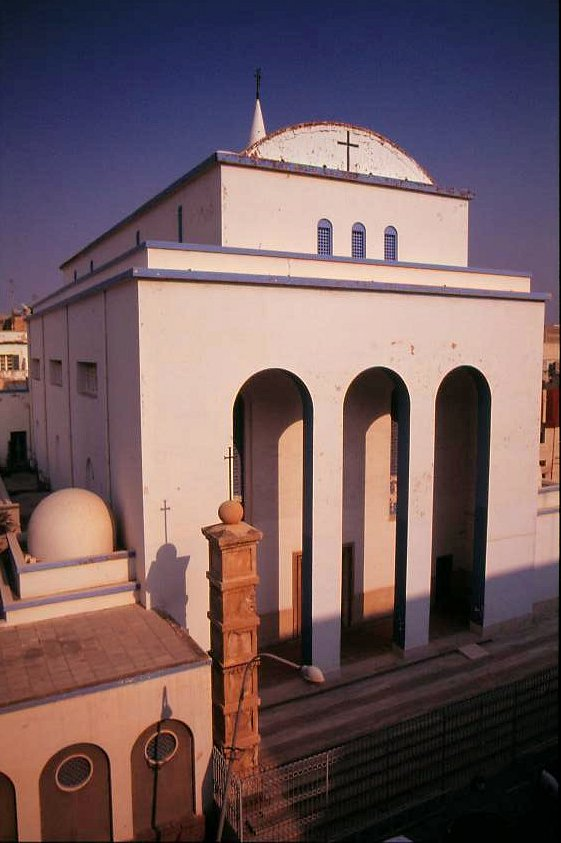
Catholic church, Tripoli

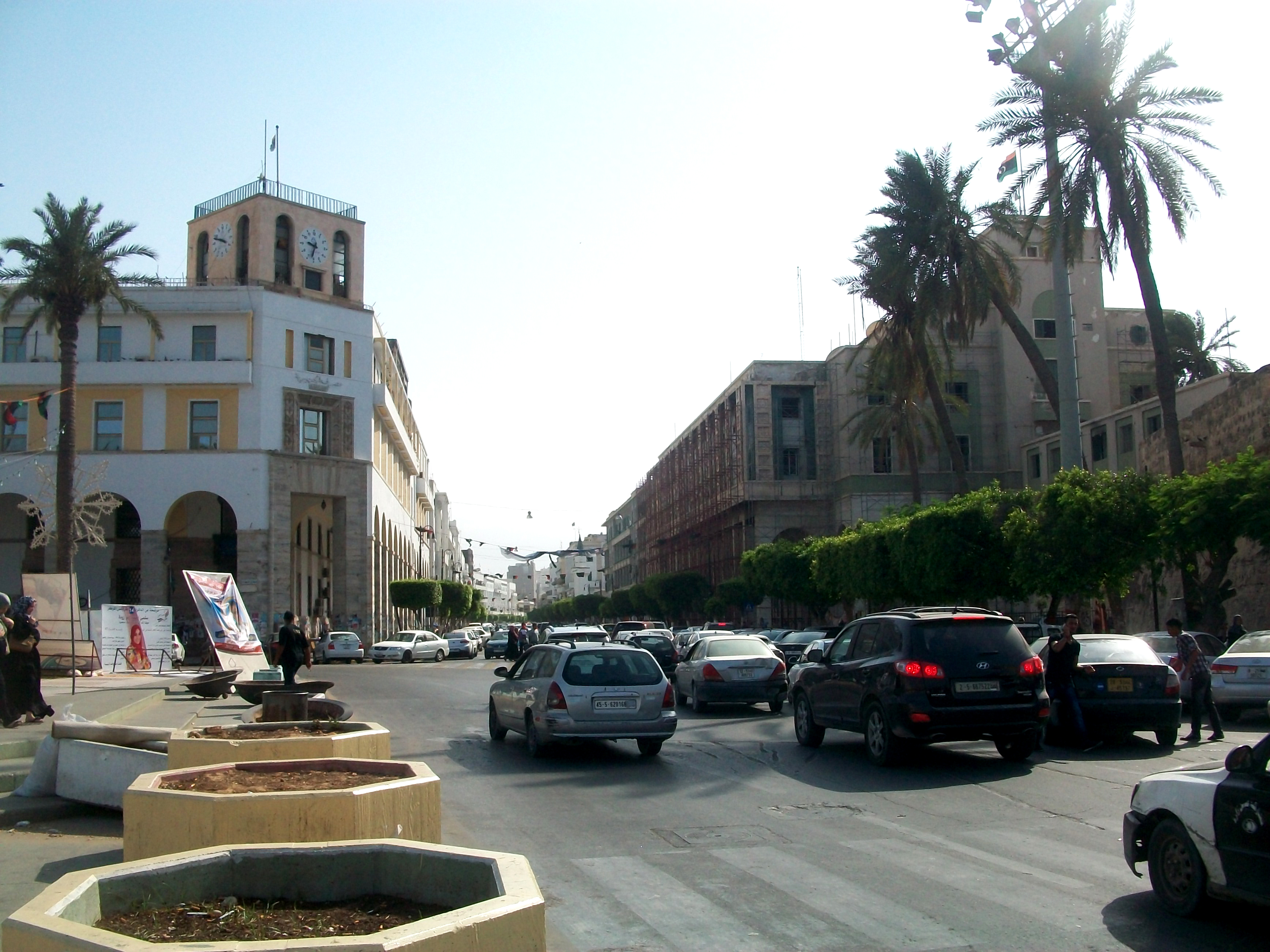
Omar Mukhtar Street, Tripoli

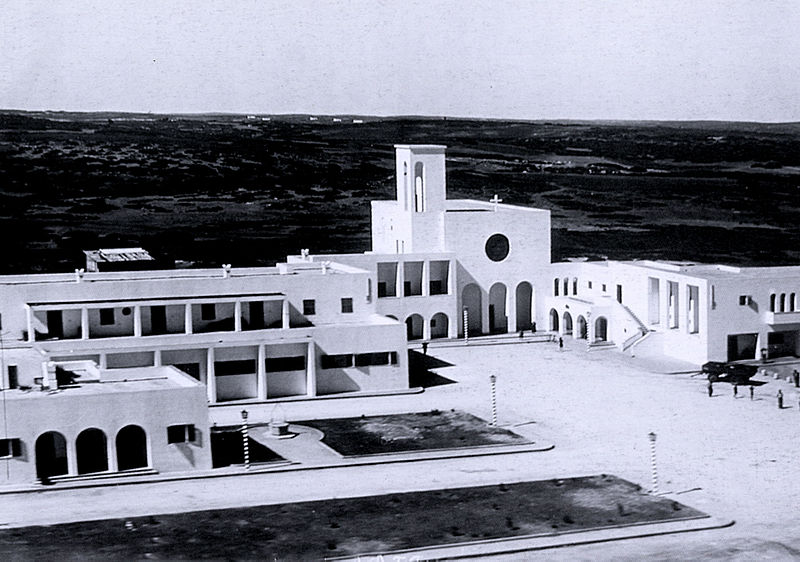
Cesare Battisti Village, Libya

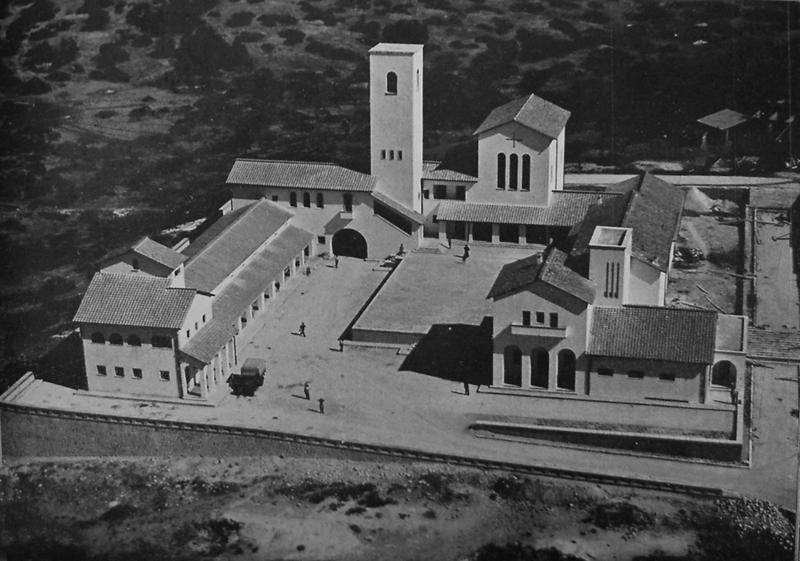
Gabriele D'Annunzio Village, Libya

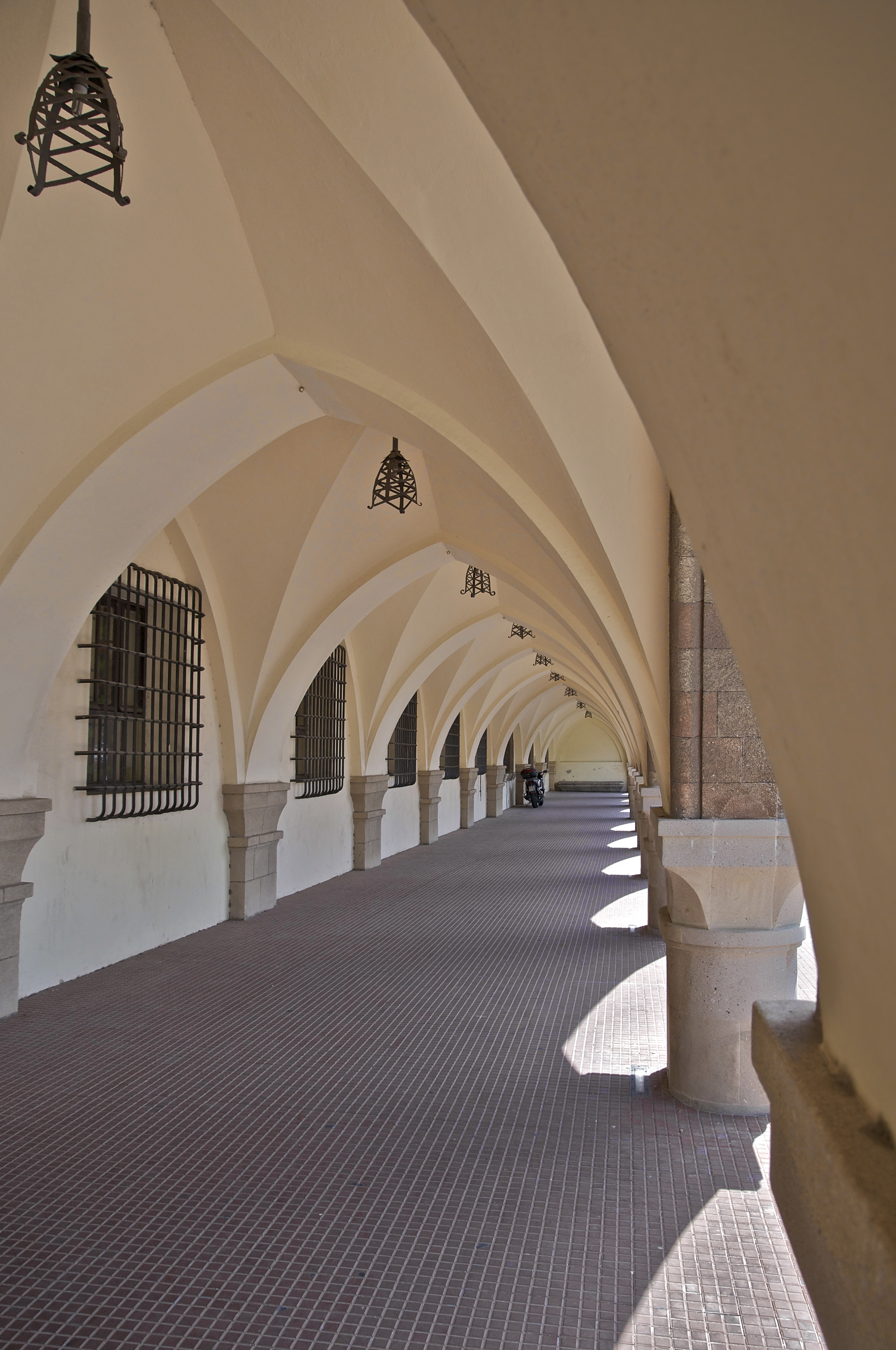
Portico of the Palazzo del Governo, now Prefecture building, Rhodes

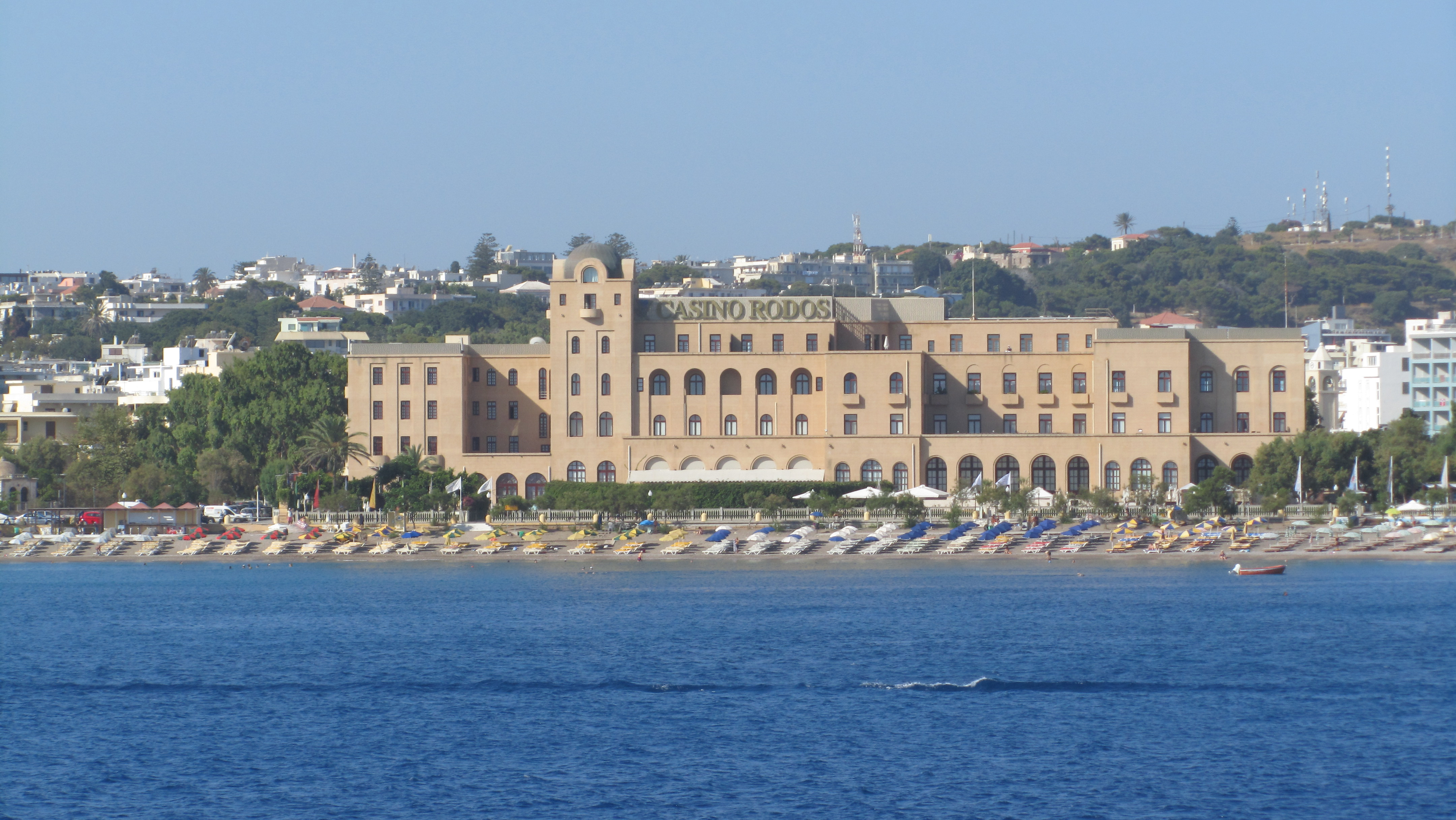
Grande albergo delle Rose, now Casino Rhodos, Rhodes, built with Michele Platania

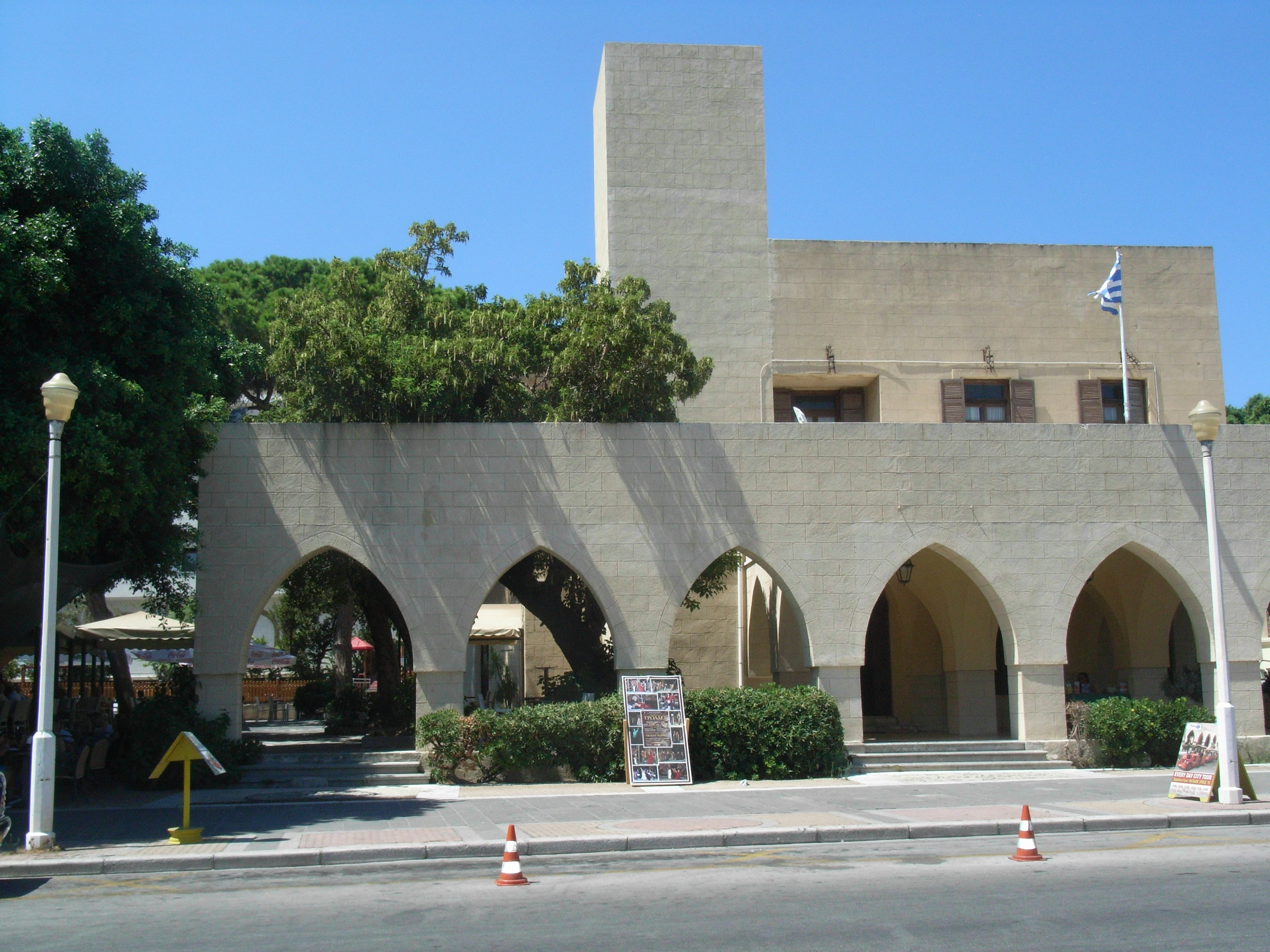
Circolo Italia in Rhodes, now a pastry shop

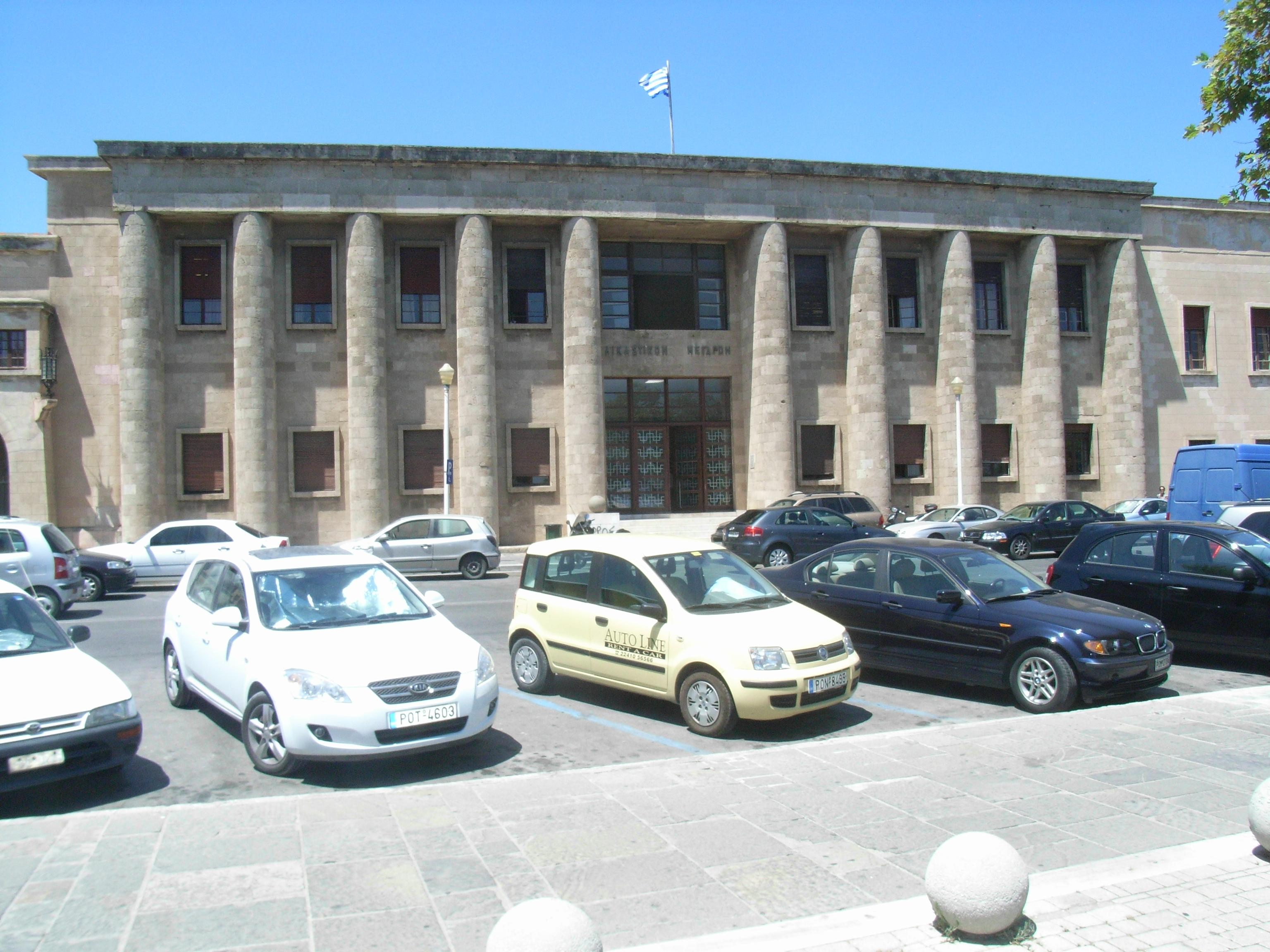
Palazzo di Giustizia, now Courthouse, Rhodes, built with Rodolfo Petracco

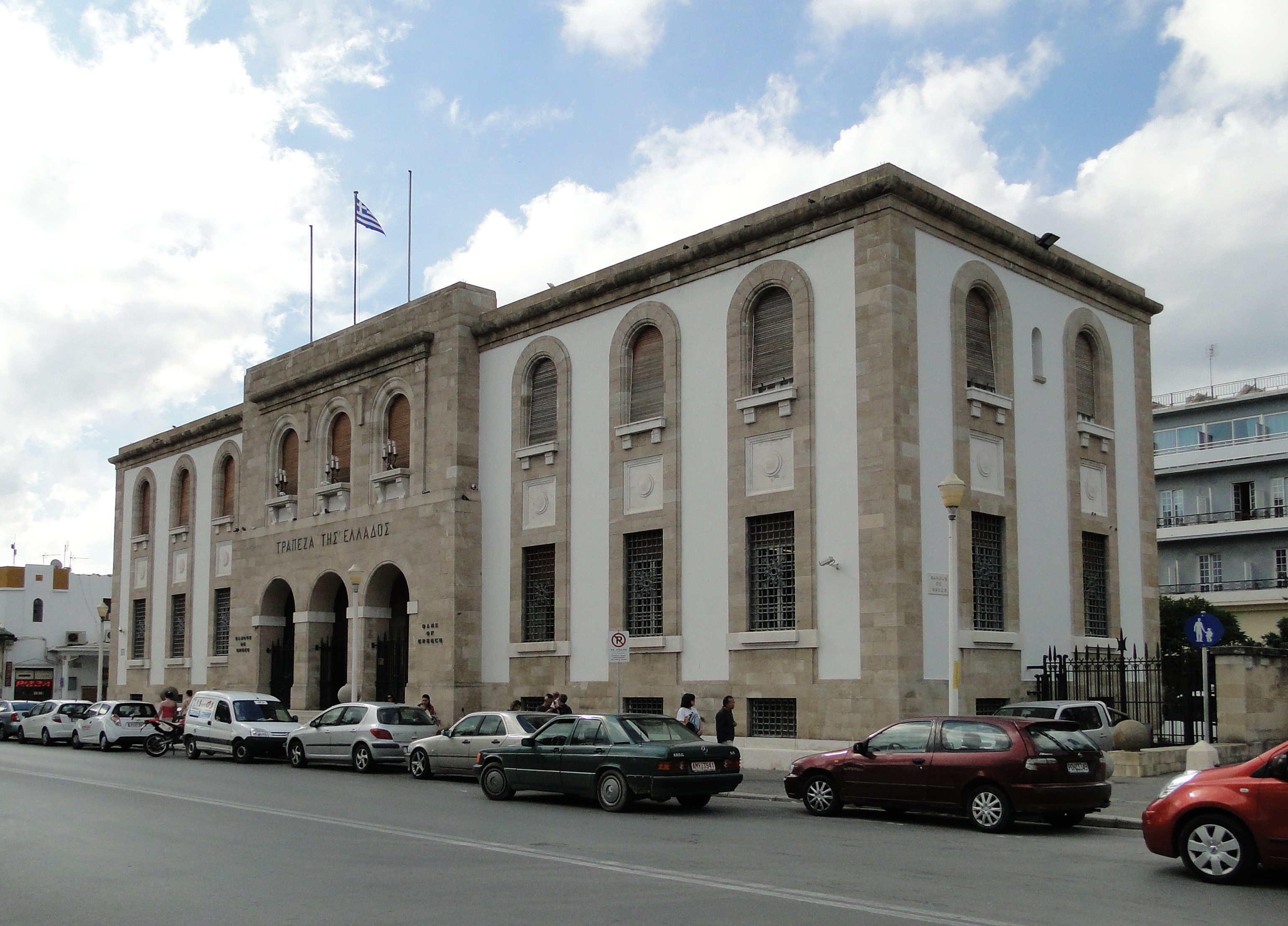
Banca d'Italia building, now Bank of Greece, Rhodes

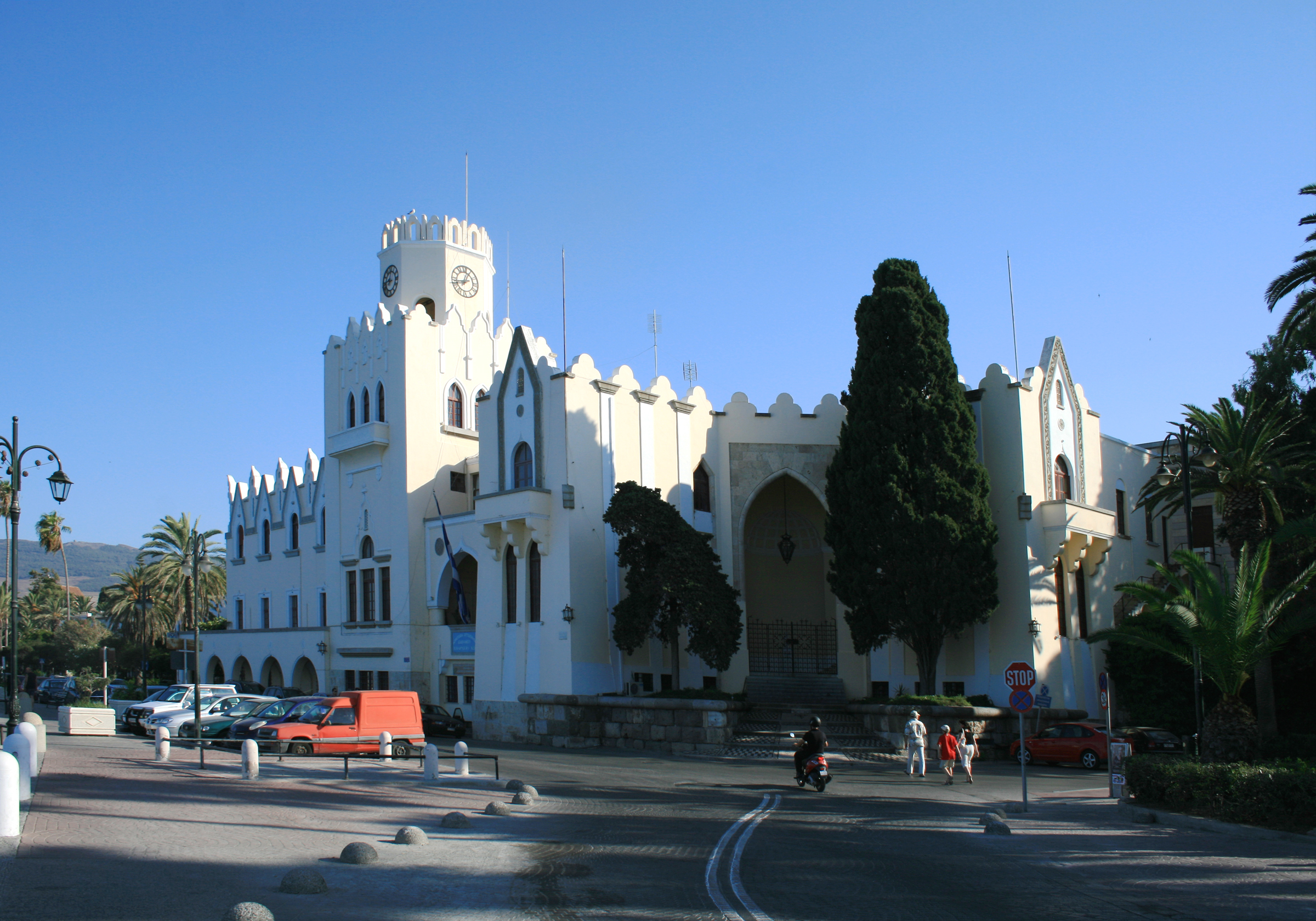
Palazzo del Governo, now Town Hall, Kos

== See also ==
- Armando Brasini

== Sources ==
- Di Fausto Florestano. Fascismo – Architettura – Arte / Arte fascista web site
- Giuseppe Miano (1991). "Florestano Di Fausto". Dizionario Biografico degli Italiani (in Italian). Enciclopedia Italiana.
- Vittorio Santoianni (2008). "Il Razionalismo nelle colonie italiane 1928–1943. La "nuova architettura" delle Terre d'Oltremare" (PDF) (in Italian). Università degli Studi di Napoli "Federico II" – Facoltà di Architettura. Dipartimento di Progettazione Architettonica e Ambientale.
- Sean Anderson (2010). "The Light and the Line: Florestano Di Fausto and the Politics of Mediterraneità". California Italian Studies. University of California. doi:10.5070/C311008864.
- Di Marco, Fabrizio (2011). "Florestano Di Fausto, architetto del Mediterraneo". In Varagnoli, Claudio (ed.). Pescara senza rughe (in Italian). Roma: Gangemi. ISBN 9788849222128.
