= Venus Verticordia =

Epithet of the Roman goddess Venus

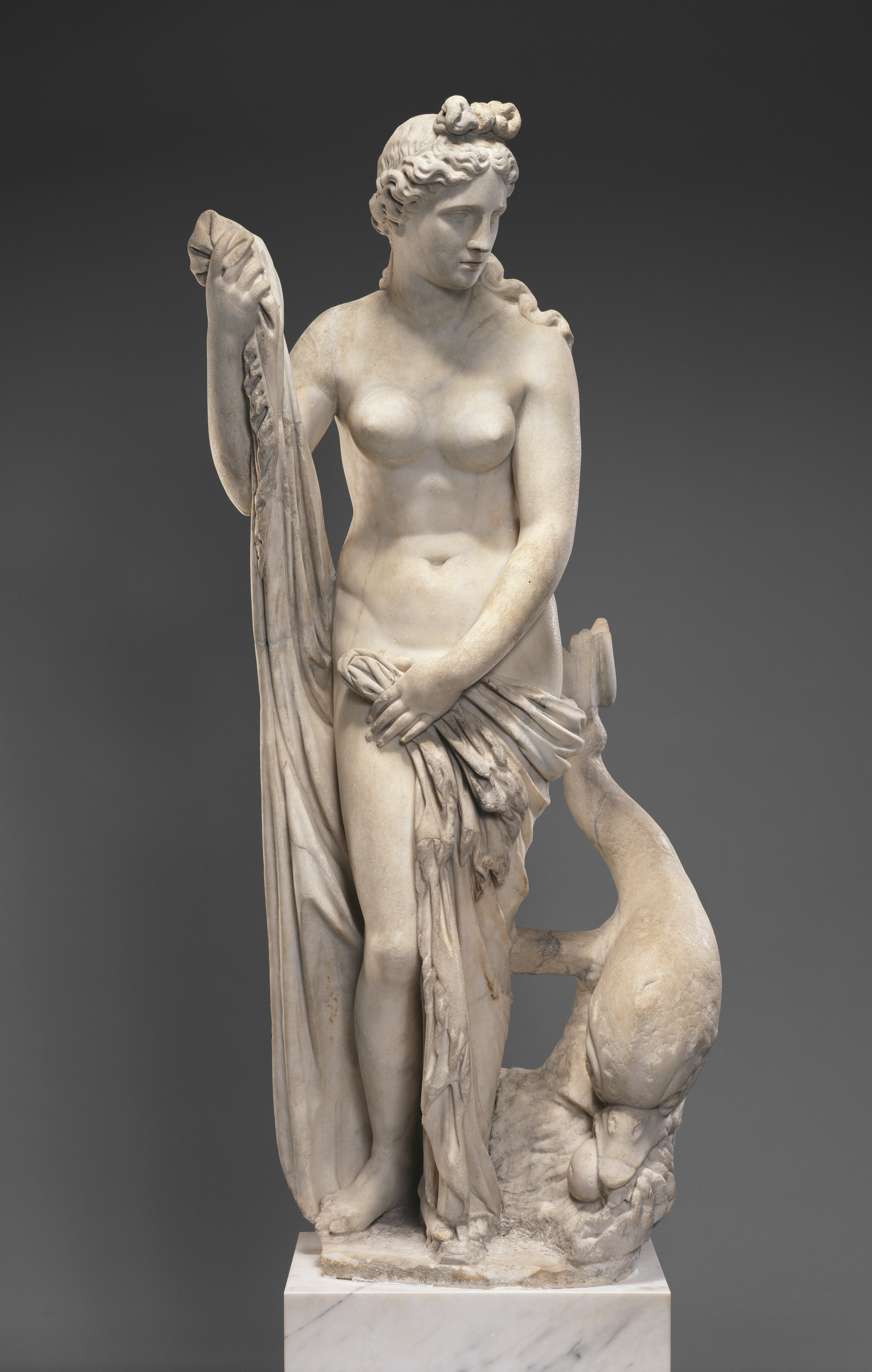
Mazarin Venus, a statuary type popular in the 2nd century AD that evokes the ritual of bathing

Venus Verticordia ("Changer of Hearts" or "Heart-Turner") was an aspect of the Roman goddess Venus conceived as having the power to convert either virgin brides or sexually active women from dissolute desire (libido) to sexual virtue (pudicitia). Under this title, Venus was especially cultivated by married women, and on 1 April she was celebrated at the Veneralia festival with public bathing.

The epithet Verticordia derives from the Latin words verto, "turn", and cor, the heart as "the seat of subjective experience and wisdom". The conversion, however, was thought of as occurring in the mind – the mens or "ethical core". Women were thus viewed as having the moral agency necessary for shaping society, albeit in roles differing from men.

Venus Verticordia was one of several goddesses whose new or reinterpreted theology or cult practice was meant to inform the conduct of women as a response to wartime upheaval and social crisis during the Roman Republic. Romans differed from Near Eastern and many Mediterranean societies in their idealizing of monogamy and marriage for companionship, expressed in the status accorded to matronae (respectably married women), and in the more visible public roles played by women, who were encouraged to display their personal excellence. The "turning" or conversion of Venus Verticordia was not meant to suppress sexual desire but to encourage its positive expression in marriage, a purposing of its power for social benefit.

== In Roman state religion ==
The first Roman shrine (aedes) for any form of Venus had been built during the Third Samnite War in 295 BC. Located near the racetrack of the Circus Maximus and dedicated to Venus Obsequens ("Compliant" Venus), it was funded by fines imposed by the aediles on upper-class married women charged with sexual misconduct (stuprum). During the wars of the Middle Republic that expanded Rome's presence throughout the Mediterranean world, and especially during the Punic Wars (264–146 BC), social and economic power among Roman women of the propertied classes increased, as they stepped in to manage domestic matters in the absence of men deployed at war. At the same time, anxieties about untethered women led to regulation of their behaviors in relation to men through both legislation and religious cultivation, counterbalancing their contributions to the Roman state and relative autonomy on the home front with expectations of loyalty and self-discipline expressed sexually.

The cult of Venus Verticordia (Note: Ancient literary sources for Venus Verticordia and rites on the Kalends of April include Ovid, Fasti 4, on practices and myths associated with the Kalends of April; Valerius Maximus 8.15, on Sulpicia as an exemplary woman and the purpose of Venus Verticordia; Fasti Praenestini, derived from the Augustan scholar Verrius Flaccus, on the rites of Fortuna Virilis; Pliny, Natural History 7.120 (34), on Sulpicia's appointment as a precedent for Claudia Quinta; Plutarch, Roman Questions 83, in a section on human sacrifice in which he relates the prodigy; Cassius Dio 26 fr. 87, in medias res on the Vestal scandal; Macrobius, Saturnalia 1.12.15 (1.56.20/23 W) from Verrius Flaccus; Julius Obsequens 37, a prodigy narrative; Orosius 5.15, also on the prodigy. The sources are at points incompatible in their details: "it is impossible to make all the texts agree unless we do violence to several of them".) was established with the installation of a statue (simulacrum) around the time of the Second Punic War, before 204 BC, possibly 220 or 214 BC, or as early as 237 or 224 BC. (Note: The earliest date of 237 BC is the first consulship of Fulvius Flaccus, if he is correctly identified as the husband of the dedicant, and if it's correct to assume that his wife performed this service during one of his consulships, the others being 224, 212, and 209 BC.) A note in Pliny the Elder that the statue was dedicated before the importation of the Mother of the Gods in 204 BC establishes a terminus ad quem. A commission of ten men (decemviri) was appointed by the Roman Senate to consult with the Sibylline Books, but no ancient source specifies a precipitating event. Schilling thought it likely that the statue was dedicated after the founding of Venus Erycina's temple in 217 BC, whose "unwholesome influences" as a goddess of sexual commerce Verticordia may have been meant to counterbalance. A date of 215/214 BC might suggest that expiation was sought after the conviction and deaths of two Vestals who broke their vows around that time, following the disastrous Battle of Cannae the year before.

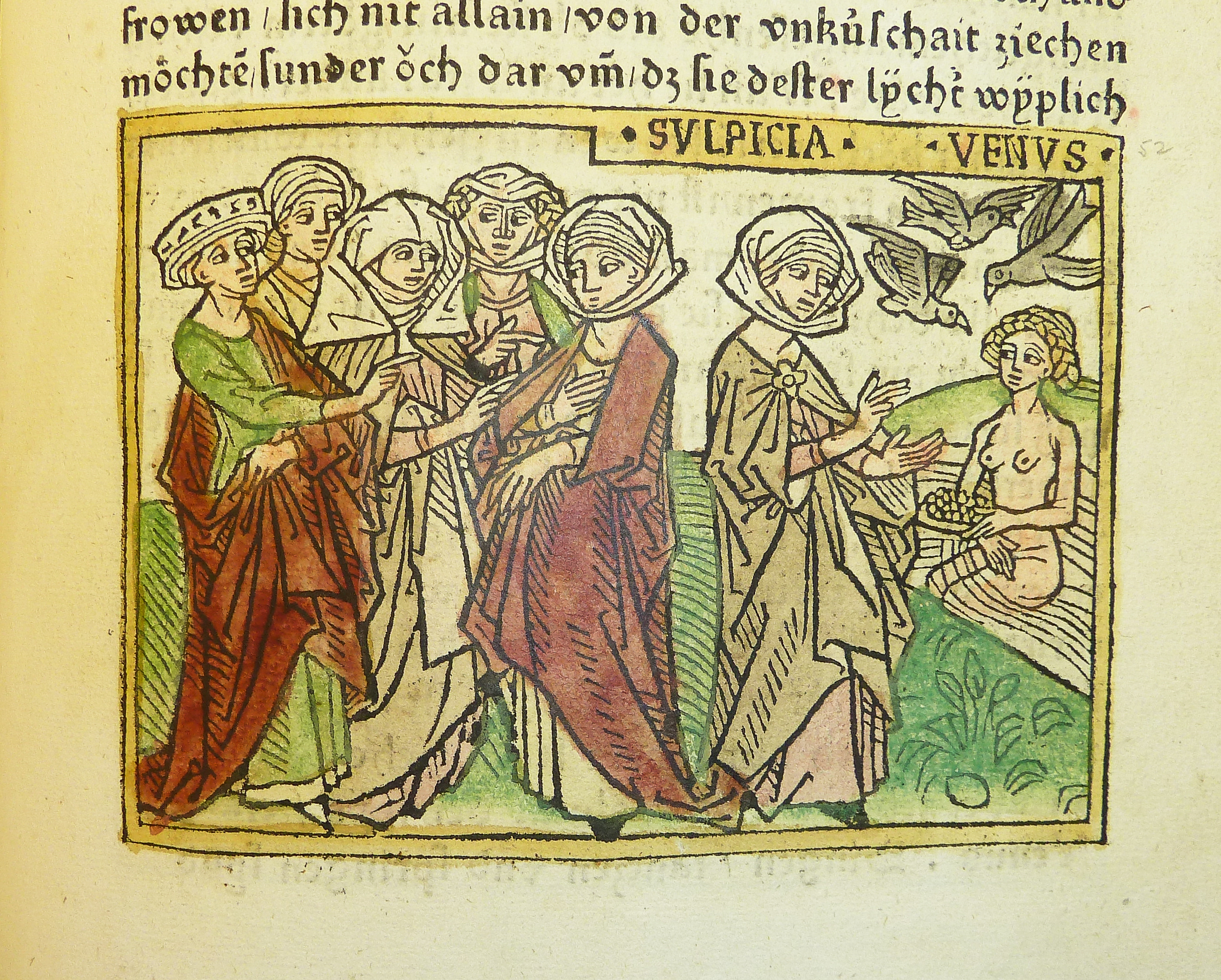
The election of Sulpicia by her peers (at left), and honoring Venus as she rises from inland water rather than the sea, in a 15th-century German woodcut

The official process behind the dedication was similar to the establishing of other women-centered cults such as that of Fortuna Muliebris at the beginning of the 5th century BC or the religious reparations owed to Juno Regina in 207 BC. A list was compiled of one hundred matronae – respectable married women – eligible to make the dedication, then their number was narrowed to ten by sortition (drawing lots). The ten women themselves nominated a Sulpicia, wife of a consul, as the most worthy of the honor among them. Pliny implies that it was the first time a woman was selected for a religious task on behalf of the state in this way, and says that this process was followed again in the selection of Claudia Quinta as the leading matron when the Magna Mater was brought to Rome in 204 BC.

The initial location of the founding statue is uncertain – generally, in the Vallis Murcia, between the northern slope of the Minor Aventine and the farther end of the Circus Maximus. It was possibly dedicated in the shrine of either Venus Obsequens or Erycina, or it may have been placed in an open-air precinct (templum) where Verticordia's shrine (aedes) was erected about a hundred years later.

=== Expansion of the cult ===
The Temple of Venus Verticordia was one of several established by the Roman Republic in response to perceived outbreaks of female debauchery, in this instance incestum, the violation of religious chastity by three of the six women serving as "professionally chaste" Vestals. By the end of the 2nd century BC, overall Rome was on sound military footing, but a few defeats, one major, signaled instability and external threats to Rome's security, which the order of the Vestals was meant to embody. The Sibylline books were again consulted, and Verticordia's became the last of eight temples – dedicated to ten different deities, seven of them goddesses – that the Romans built in accordance with Sibylline authority. The earlier cult statue of Verticordia would have been moved there.

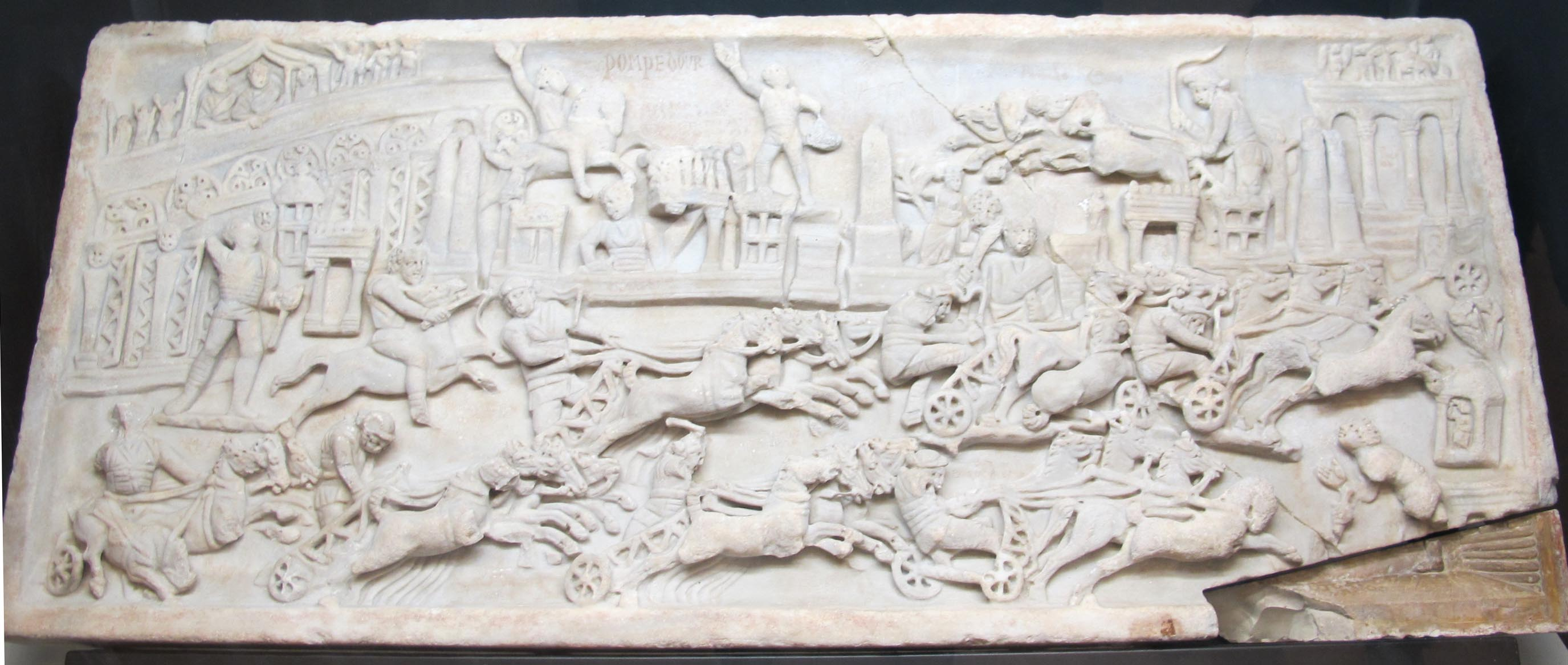
The Circus Maximus in the Vallis Murcia (3rd-century relief), dense with religious landmarks and icons such as the small shrine of Murcia with its myrtles (lower right corner)

Work on the temple started in 114 BC. It was located in the Vallis Murcia, possibly near the shrine of Murcia at the Circus Maximus, but the proximity of functionally overlapping temples to Murcia and multiple Venuses in this area leaves uncertainties in interpreting the ancient texts. Coarelli assumed that the Temple of Venus Verticordia physically replaced that of the archaic Fortuna Virilis; the two deities shared a feast day. No traces of these buildings have been detected in the archaeological record at the site. Other than the annual feast day when the statue was bathed, nothing is known of the shrine's quotidian operations; since Verticordia was cultivated only by women, it seems likely that temple personnel included priestesses and female attendants.

=== Denarius of 46 BC ===
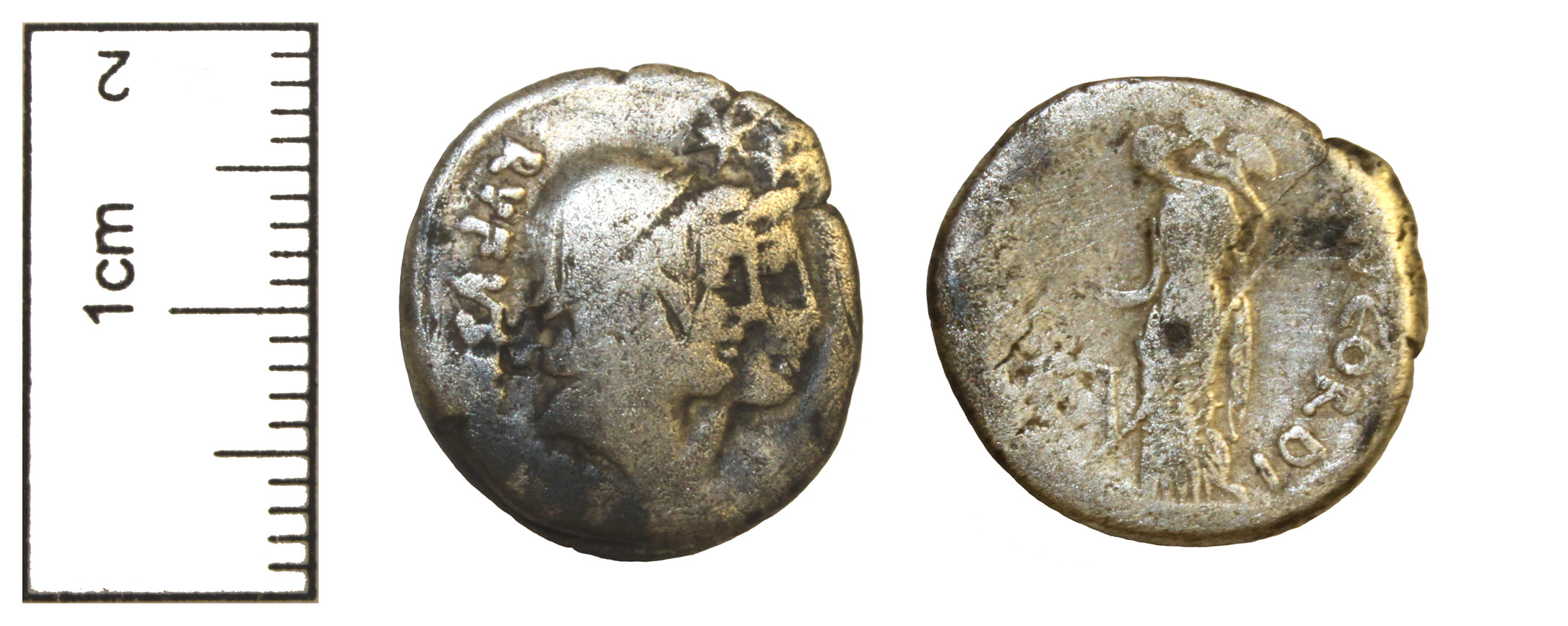
Denarius (46 BC) perhaps depicting Venus Verticordia on the reverse, with the Dioscuri on the obverse (Note: Clearer examples of this denarius are assembled at Coin Talk, posted 21 October 2019, accessed 13 October 2024)

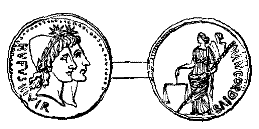
Woodcut reconstructing details (Dictionary of Roman Coins, 1889)

Since an identification by numismatists in the 19th century, a Republican denarius issued in 46 BC has sometimes been thought to depict Venus Verticordia on the reverse. The diademed figure holds a balance scale in her right hand and a sceptre in the left, with a small Cupid hovering at her shoulder. She wears a tunic and pallium (or palla). The Dioscuri appear on the obverse. The balance scale is a regular attribute of Aequitas ("Fair Measure"); the presence of Cupid marks the figure as a Venus.

Salomon Reinach thought it unlikely that the scale represented the power of Verticordia to bring balance to the passions, and considered it more generally to relate Venus to the zodiac sign of Libra, given the astrological preoccupations of the time, though in the late Republic Venus was more often associated with Taurus. While the cult of Verticordia is sometimes viewed as bringing equilibrium to the influence of Venus, countering her sexual force with the self-discipline of pudicitia, it may be a stretch to read the iconography of the coin as expressing that function.

The coin was issued by the moneyer Manius Cordius Rufus, and an identification as Verticordia is largely premised on an allusion to his family name, the gens Cordia. During this period, Julius Caesar was claiming Venus as his divine ancestor, and the goddess was prominent in his iconography under various cult titles, particularly Venus Genetrix, Venus as the mother of the Roman people. Although Verticordia expresses the more conservative values that Genetrix embodies, given that new instantiations of Venus were in vogue, no compelling reason emerges for Verticordia to have been revived at this time. Michael Crawford thought the figure of Venus more likely to be of the same type as the statue installed that year in the Temple of Venus Genetrix.

== Founding narratives ==
The narratives that explain the founding of Venus Verticordia's cult blend history and myth, as is characteristic of Roman mythology and its focus on human actions within a divine order that supports the Roman state. Ancient sources indicate that both the dedication of the statue and the building of the temple were religious responses during a time of military and social crisis.

=== Statue dedication ===
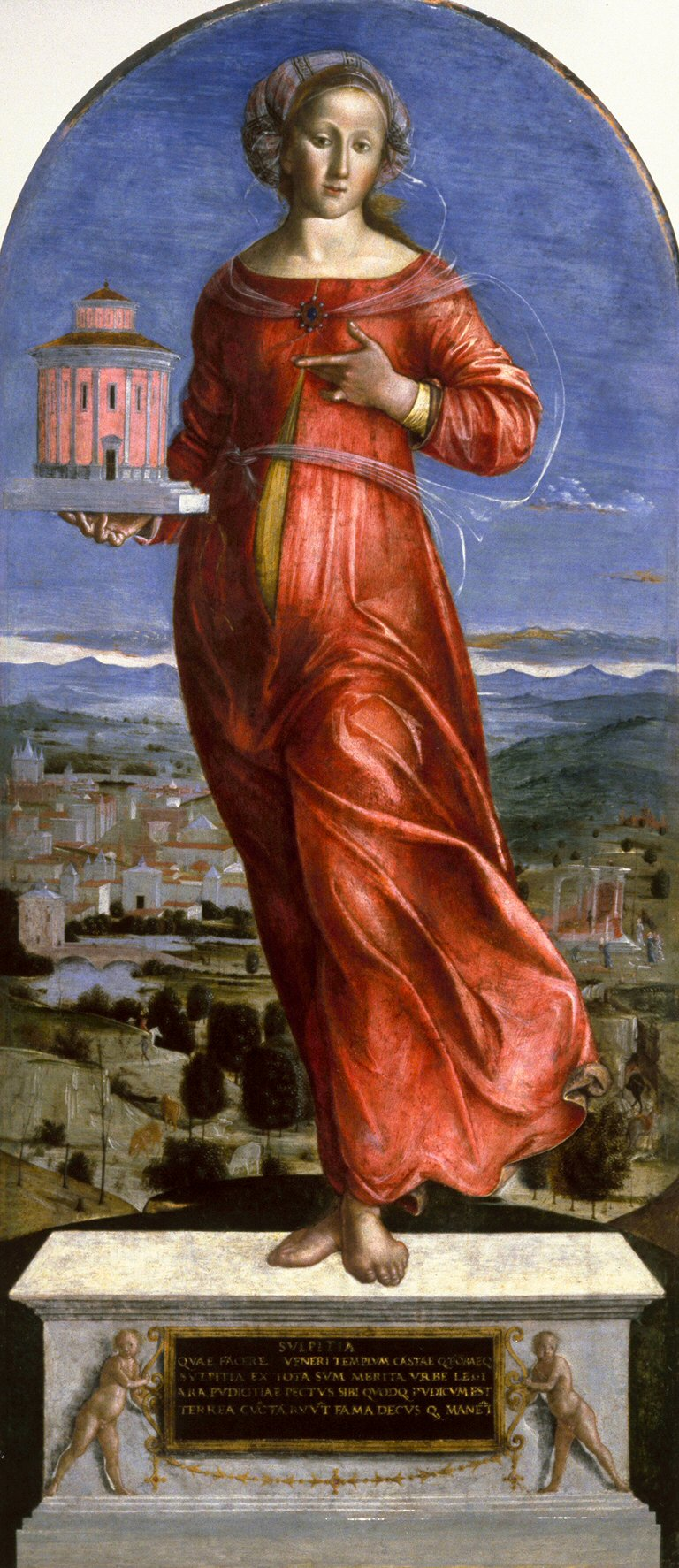
Sulpitia by Orioli, an Italian Renaissance depiction of Sulpicia as a model of virtue, holding a circular temple

In the latter 3rd century BC, following a consultation with the Sibylline Books, it was determined that a statue of Venus Verticordia was required in response to the impudicitia of Roman matrons. Legislative concern about the immoderate behavior of matrons, or more precisely their ability to control wealth, was expressed around this time in the passage of the lex Oppia of 216 BC, a sumptuary law that sought to restrict the amount of gold a woman could own as well as the ways she could display her wealth. The wealth of women would have increased through inheritance as losses in war reduced the male population – thousands had died in the Battle of Cannae in a single day that year. At a time of prodigies and moral panic, as well as the diminished presence of men in everyday life, Roman women throughout this century were called on to participate more visibly in state religion, and doing so required them to move in relative freedom about the city, either in carriages or on foot accompanied by numerous attendants. Aemilia, the wife of Scipio Africanus, arguably Rome's greatest general in the Second Punic War, was transported in an ornate carriage and employed implements of gold and silver in carrying out women's rites.

This greater public role put stress on conservative Roman society that the Oppian limitations on modes of mobility and wealth, caused in part by displays of religious piety, were meant to confine to the purpose of religious cultivation. The Oppian law was related to other extraordinary efforts in 216 BC toward restraining women who had been engaged in war protests and demonstrations in the Forum Romanum following Cannae. When Cato the Elder argued twenty years later against repealing the lex Oppia, he railed that women being given free rein to ride horses or drive carriages was a perversion, since the ungovernable nature of women required them to submit to the yoke of customs and laws even when they thought them unjust. His argument failed on the grounds that women were part of Rome's progress toward civilization, and the law was repealed.

The statue of Venus Verticordia was perhaps intended "to rebuke women who had formed 'irregular liaisons'" when their husbands or other men who held guardianship (tutela) over them were away at war. From a list of one hundred matrons, presumably of senatorial rank, who were religiously and morally eligible to dedicate the statue, ten were chosen by lot. After some sort of "real virtue contest" among the ten finalists, the women themselves chose Sulpicia for the honor.

Sulpicia is most likely historical, though she became a legendary figure. Valerius Maximus says that she was the daughter of a Paterculus and the wife of a Quintus Fulvius Flaccus, presumably the consul of 237 BC. She is described in superlatives as sanctissima ("most holy"), elevated above all others in castitas ("purity", both religious and sexual), and pudicissima, of utmost sexual integrity. The French sociologist Jean-Claude Kaufmann imagined Sulpicia herself as the model for the statue, since she embodied the desired virtues.

=== Prodigy of the temple ===
About a hundred years after the statue was dedicated, as tensions in North Africa were mounting for the Iugurthine War, the Temple of Venus Verticordia was built in response to a prodigy (prodigium). The protagonist in the story was a virgin, Greek parthenos in Plutarch and virgo in Latin sources, named as Elbia, Elvia, or Helvia. Plutarch (early 2nd century AD) says Elbia was out horseback riding when she was struck dead by a lightning bolt. She was found naked, with her dress (chiton) pulled up as if on purpose, and with her shoes, rings, and hair bindings (kekryphalos) torn off and scattered around. Her mouth was open, and the tongue was hanging out. Her horse was also found dead and stripped of its trappings. The haruspices (manteis) immediately connected the incident to a disgrace among the Vestals, probably issuing their response in September 114 BC, and an investigation was launched. (Note: Plutarch, Quaestiones Romanae 83, Greek edition of Babbitt (1936).)

Julius Obsequens (late 4th/early 5th century AD), who compiled a collection of prodigies and drew on now-lost parts of the Augustan-era historian Livy's work, dates the incident to the consulship of Manius Acilius Balbus and Gaius Porcius Cato in 114 BC. He identifies the virgin as the daughter of a Publius Elvius, a member of the equestrian order. While Plutarch has her out riding alone and her body later discovered, in Obsequens' account she is traveling in the company of her father from the Roman Games to Apulia when the incident occurs in the ager Stellas, the Stellate Plain. (Note: The place name translated into English as Stellate Plain is found in Latin variously as ager Stellas, Stellatis, and Stellatus.) She is left dead by the lightning strike, with her garment pulled up to expose her genitals and her tongue hanging out, as if fire had flashed from the "lower places" (per inferiores locos) to her mouth. While the death of the horse is not explicitly reported, its trappings (ornamenta) are said to have been scattered about. (Note: Julius Obsequens 37.)

In the version of the Christian writer Orosius (died ca. 420 AD), the equestrian Lucius Helvius was returning to Apulia from Rome with his wife and daughter when a storm struck the traveling party. Seeing that his daughter was upset by the storm, he decided to leave the vehicles behind and to proceed more quickly on horseback to seek shelter. But when the girl rode into the middle of the traveling party, she was struck dead by lightning, which caused her clothing to be pulled off without being torn – the bindings at her breast and feet were undone, and her necklaces and rings yanked off. She was left lying "in an obscene manner", naked but with no injury apparent, and her tongue hanging out "just a little". As with Plutarch, the horse is struck dead too, and its bridle and harnessing unfastened and scattered. The wife, unmentioned in the other versions, plays no role in the story. (Note: Orosius 5.15.20–21.)

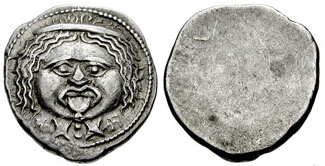
Gorgoneion on an Etruscan coin from Populonia with blank reverse (211 BC or later)

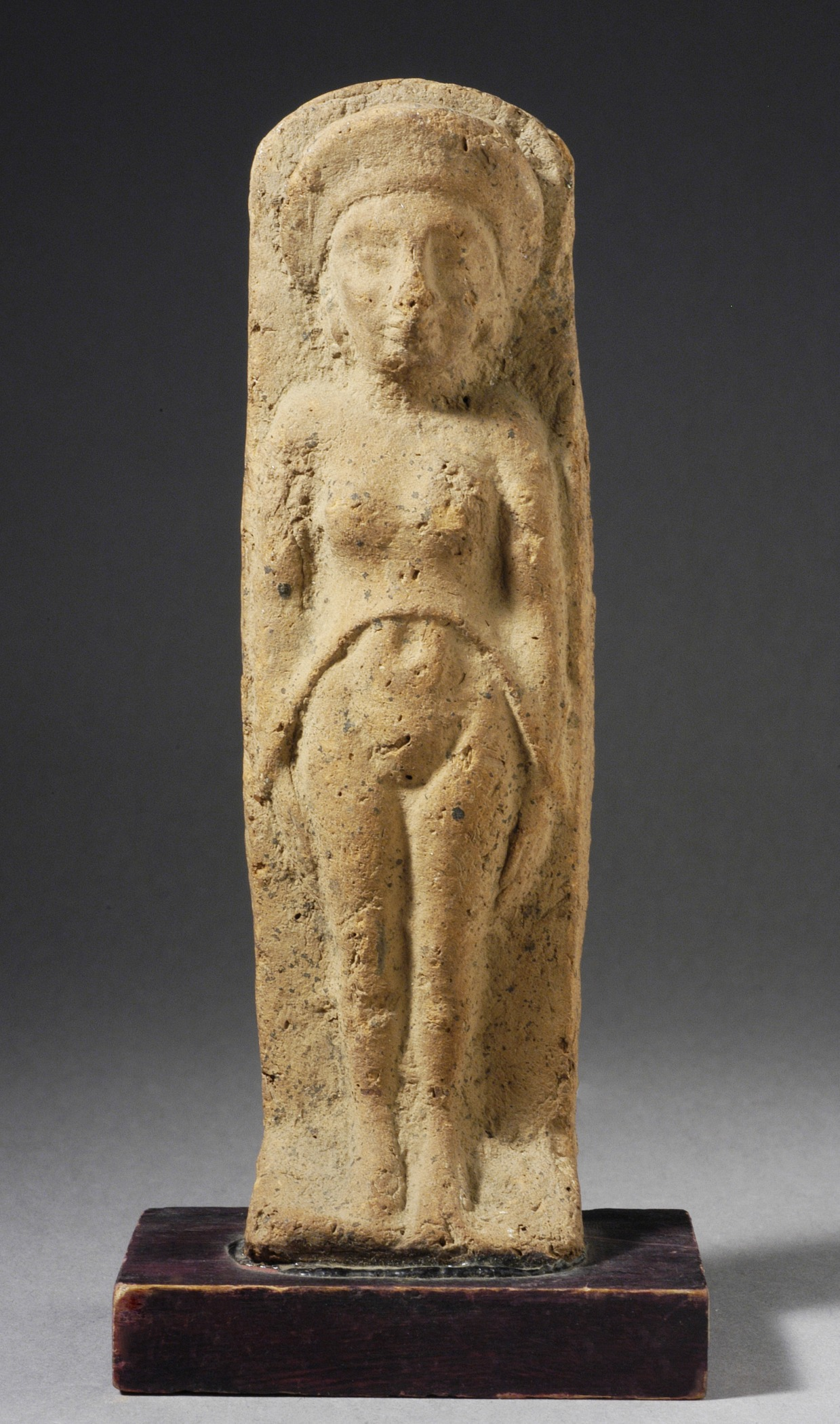
"Baubo" figurine of the Astarte-Isis-Aphrodite anasyrma type (Egypt, 1st century BC–1st century AD)

Outside the taking of official auspices, an unsought sign that violated the predictable orderliness of the physical world occasioned alarm. The prodigium was a sign of divine displeasure, and the religious offense that provoked it had to be identified and expiated. The frequency of recorded prodigies seems to have been especially intense during the Second Punic War, and these were often accompanied by lightning, a speciality of Etruscan divination. The forensic techniques for interpreting lightning accounted for elements such as the direction from which the strike came and what kind of damage it left. For instance, Julius Obsequens traced the path of the strike from "lower places" to the mouth – lightning from below being one of the standard signifying types. The scattering of the horse trappings, according to Obsequens, was a sign that pointed to the involvement of the equestrian order. (Note: Julius Obsequens 37: Responsum infamiam virginibus et equestri ordini portendi, quia equi ornamenta dispersa erant.)

The Sibylline Books were consulted, and an official pronouncement (responsum) formalized the accusation against members of the equestrian order along with three Vestals in the disgrace, which Obsequens labels infamia. The consultation with the Sibylline Books may have been the source for the epithet Verticordia, modeled after the Greek cult of Aphrodite Apostrophia, who turned away (from apo-, "away," and stroph-, "turn") disordered acts of sexuality. Danielle Porte saw apotropaism in the powers of Venus Verticordia, as can be read into the prodigy's imagery of the protruding tongue characteristic of gorgoneia and female genitalia exposed as in the anasyrma skirt-lifting gesture. (Note: The gorgon's head was concretely connected to genitalia in figurines such as those found in Priene in a temple of Demeter, and was displayed on armor, including the aegis of the virgin goddess Athena, as a form of "war magic".) Plutarch writes of anasyrma by women as a gesture of repelling a besieging enemy. In the telling of the Roman poet Ovid, the beautiful virgin Medusa becomes the frightening gorgon after she is raped by Poseidon/Neptune. The connection between the wrathful power of Medusa's gaze and the deflecting gesture of anasyrma is expressed in a complex of myths encompassing Medusa and Baubo, who lifted her skirts in impudent mockery and warded off Demeter's fury over the rape of her daughter Persephone. Reinach uniquely argued that Verticordia was herself une ravageuse ("ravager"), taking the verb verto to mean overturning or upsetting hearts, based on Latin usage at the time of the cult's initial founding. Hence the temple was a way to appease a seething goddess who caused disordered behavior that affected women.

==== Trial of the Vestals ====
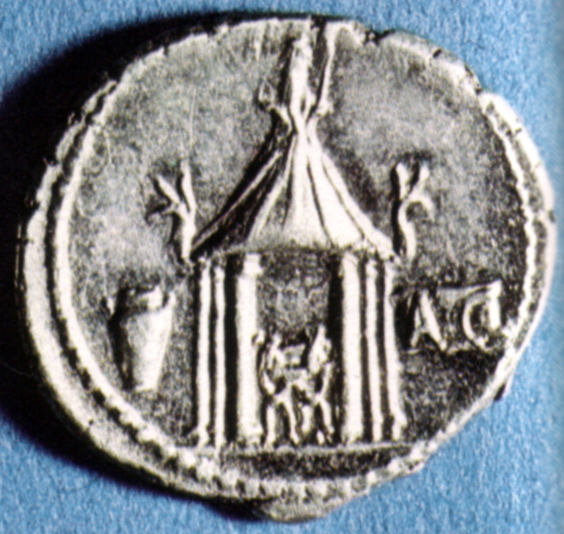
Reverse of a denarius (55 BC) depicting the Temple of Vesta, site of the trial; at left is a voting urn, with a ballot on the right marked A for Absolvo ("I acquit") and C for Condemno ("I convict")

The story of the Vestals that caused the founding of Venus Verticordia's temple is "extraordinary" in the scope of its crimen incesti (criminal unchastity), involving three Vestals in acts of unprecedented sexual excess. Among the duties of the public priesthood of the Vestals was religious maintenance: of the eternal flame of the virgin goddess Vesta; of a state storehouse of archives and artifacts such as the Palladium; and of their own chastity – all regarded as not merely symbols but actual guarantors of Roman security and power. A Vestal's castitas differed from the pudicitia of a matron in that, like Rome's walls, her body was not to be breached. The temple was open to the public during the day, but at night men were forbidden even to enter. Even one incident of unchastity (incestum) involving a single Vestal spelled instability or a pending disaster for Rome. The Vestal who violated her vow not only had done something morally and religiously wrong but was a criminal and a traitor. The execution of a condemned Vestal was simultaneously an expiation of a religious pollution and a sentence for treason.

The prodigy of the horse-riding virgin was linked to three Vestals – from three illustrious families, the gentes Marcia, Aemilia, and Licinia – committing repeated acts of sexual misconduct with several members of the equestrian order. The Greek historian Cassius Dio, writing in the early 3rd century AD, gives an account "of orgiastic proportion". Marcia had discreetly taken one equestrian (often translated as "knight", though not a precise equivalent to the Roman social rank) as her lover, but Aemilia and Licinia carried on with several serially, telling each man he was the only one. Then the two women started having sex with anyone who knew about it, so as to implicate them and ensure their silence under the threat of the execution that awaited any man who violated a Vestal. Finally they progressed to hosting group sex together and, in an act of quasi-incest in the modern sense, traded off sex with each other's brother.

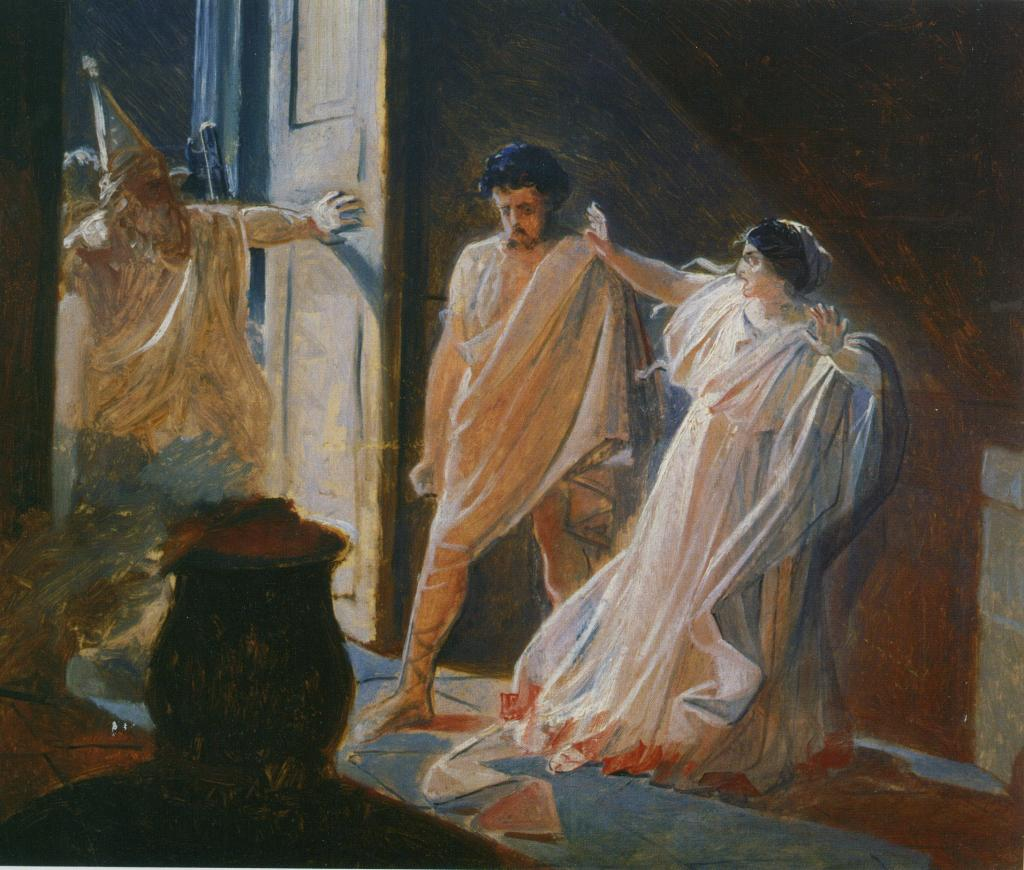
Love of the Vestal (1857) by Nikolay Ge

The trial before the pontiffs started in December 114 BC; the proceedings have been described as "exceptional and no doubt politically motivated." According to Asconius, only Aemilia was condemned, and the other two were absolved; (Note: The statement of Asconius is unambiguous, and no crux or manuscript variance appears in the critical apparatus at this point in the edition of Clark. Some scholarship, however, asserts that only Marcia was condemned by the pontiffs at the first trial.) however, the people (populus), unsatisfied with the verdict, demanded a quaestio, a specially convened tribunal. The decision of the pontiffs was reversed, and all three Vestals were condemned for incestum. Although the incident has sometimes been seen as a clash between the senatorial and equestrian orders, not all the men implicated were equestrians, and the political utility of the "religious hysteria" generated during this time seems to have resided in challenging the judgment and authority of the pontifex maximus and censuring the College of Pontiffs. Popularist politics may have been in play in rebuking an elite for the abuse of privilege.

Because of the magico-religious aura of the Vestals, trials involving them often took on the character of witch hunts in the literal sense; however, the attendant moral panic in Rome was directed not at the socially disadvantaged but at the most elite women: the Vestal Virgins, who in this period came only from upper-class families, and matronae, respectably married women of the propertied classes, perceived as conspiring amongst themselves. The guilt and behaviors of the Vestals may have been exaggerated, or they may have been genuinely rebelling against the strictures of their office at a time when Roman women in general were pushing against the boundaries of traditional roles. In explaining the Temple of Venus Verticordia, the Augustan poet Ovid blames a general decline in pudicitia in his great-grandfathers' day.

==== Human sacrifice ====
The prodigy of the lightning-struck virgin precipitated a religious crisis and moral panic, and the consultation of the Sibylline Books by the decemviri produced a further demand in addition to the founding of Verticordia's temple along with the punishment of the Vestals for inchastity – a rare instance of human sacrifice in ancient Rome. Livy calls the practice "hardly Roman", but this particular rite had been enacted once or twice before, in 216 BC during the Hannibalic War or more certainly in 228 BC. (Note: There is a lack of consensus among scholars as to whether there are two or three documented instances of this form of human sacrifice in Rome, owing to some confusion of the 228 and 216 dates. It's possible that a sacrifice of this nature was carried out both times. Also complicating a desirable coherence is the question of whether a Vestal's death sentence was a form of human sacrifice, and whether all the unusual religious events occurring around the same time were necessarily intertwined.) An external threat to Rome, a lightning prodigy, consultation of the Sibylline Books, a Vestal scandal, and the sacrifice of two couples, one Gallic and one Greek, are shared elements that scholars have sought to reconcile in the previous sacrifice and that of 114 BC.

In the earlier instance, the Sibylline Books had warned that a lightning strike near the Capitol would be a warning to guard against a Gallic occupation. To fulfill the prophecy while averting harm from Rome, the couples were buried alive in the Forum Boarium, so that they could be said to have occupied the city. Burial alive was also the ritual form of death for a Vestal who broke her vows, but punishing a Vestal is not a prerequisite for carrying out the couples sacrifice. According to Plutarch, the human sacrifice associated with Verticordia's temple founding in 114 BC was the last human sacrifice carried out in Rome.

== The Veneralia and the calendar ==
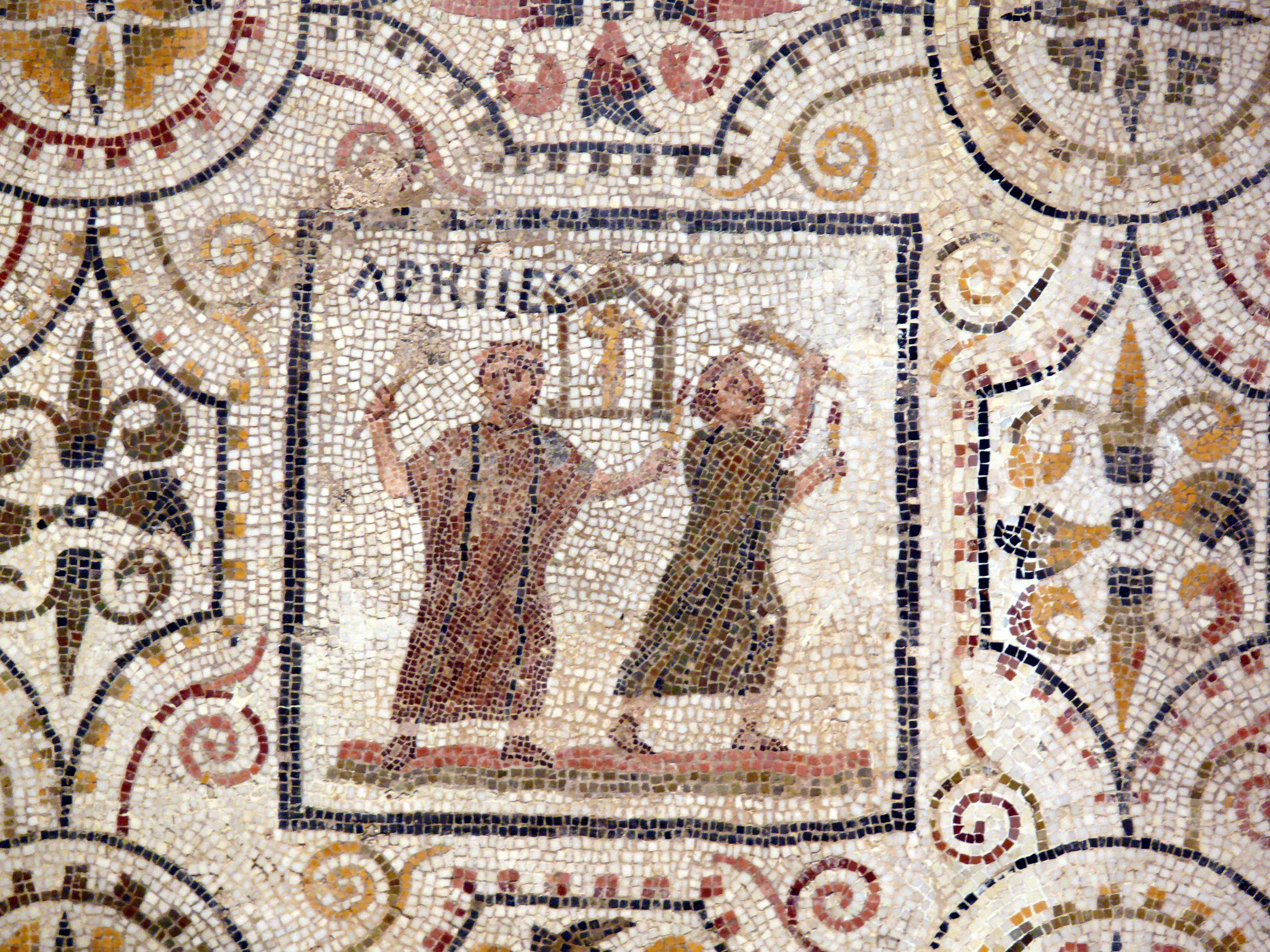
Two women celebrate an April rite of Venus, probably the Veneralia, before a cult statue of the Anadyomene type, on a calendar mosaic from El Djem, Roman Africa, 3rd century AD

The feast day of Venus took place on 1 April (the Kalends). Verticordia may have supplanted or been a refinement of an older form of Venus originally honored on the Kalends, and she shares the day with Fortuna Virilis, an older instantiation of the goddess Fortuna whose origins are unknown. The Kalends of April was one of three days during the year when a woman expected to receive a gift from her male romantic partner, the other two being her birthday and the Sigillaria in December. No games (ludi) were held as they were for many other religious festivals.

The whole month of April, Latin Aprilis, was under the guardianship (tutela) of Venus, and Ovid and others took Aphrodite, the name of her Greek counterpart, as the origin of the word Aprilis. The more common view among the Romans was that Aprilis derived from the verb aperire, "to open", according to Verrius Flaccus because it was the month when "fruits and flowers and animals and seas and lands do open". April and June were the most propitious months for weddings, as they were presided over by Venus and then Juno as a goddess of marriage. The April religious calendar was dominated by female rites, with major festivals for Magna Mater ("Great Mother") and Ceres as well as days for Venus. The Kalends is not named as the Veneralia until the Calendar of Filocalus in AD 354, which illustrates the month of April with a scene from the theatrical ludi of Magna Mater.

=== The Kalends of April in Ovid's Fasti ===
The most detailed source on the rites of Venus on 1 April is the Kalends of April section in Book 4 of Ovid's poem about the Roman calendar, the Fasti, but the word Verticordia is metrically impossible in elegiac couplets and thus can't be used as an epithet for Venus in the poem. Ovid refers to Verticordia, however, in a line that plays on the etymology of the epithet: inde Venus verso nomina corde tenet, "and from her change of heart Venus holds her title."

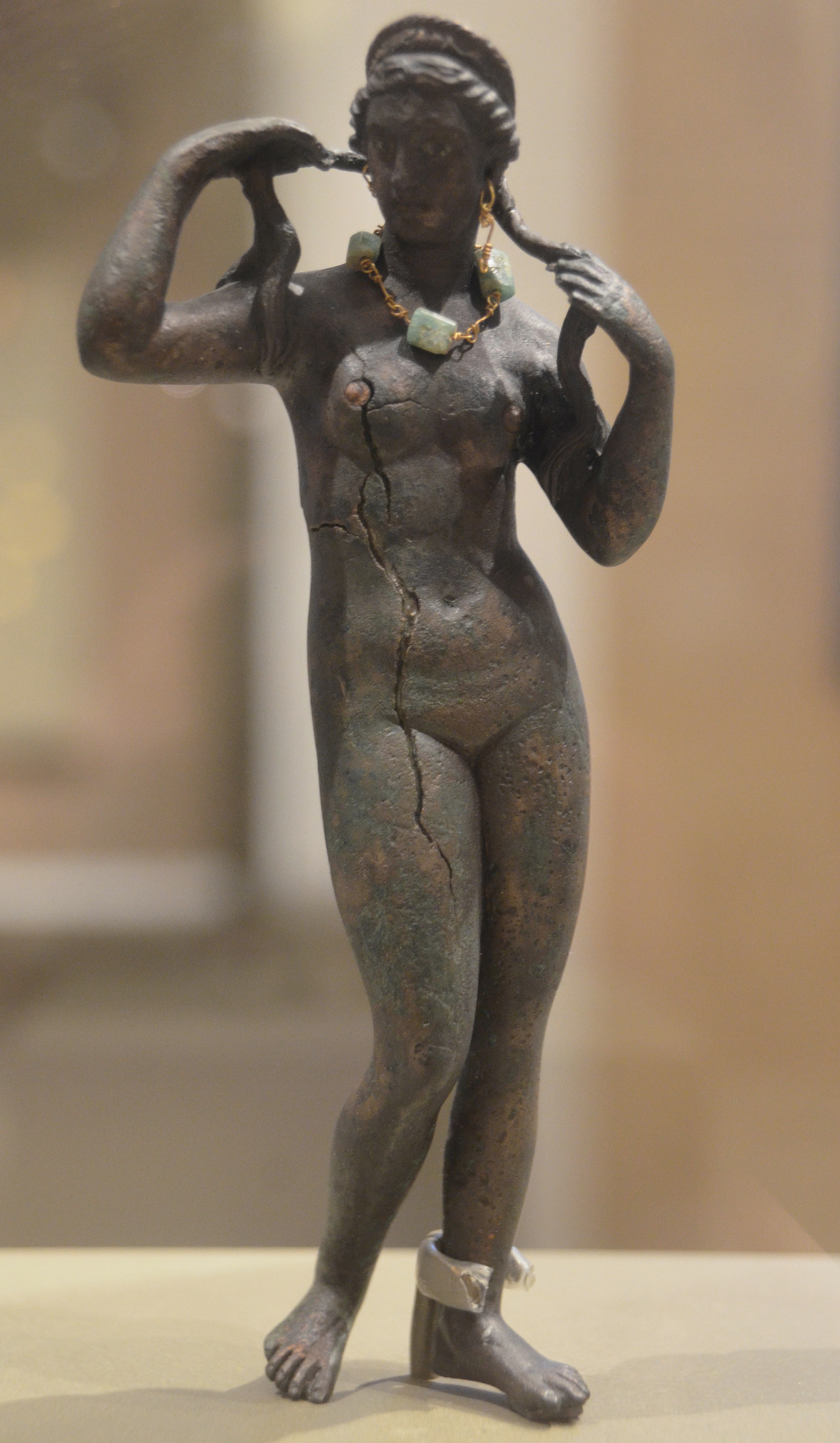
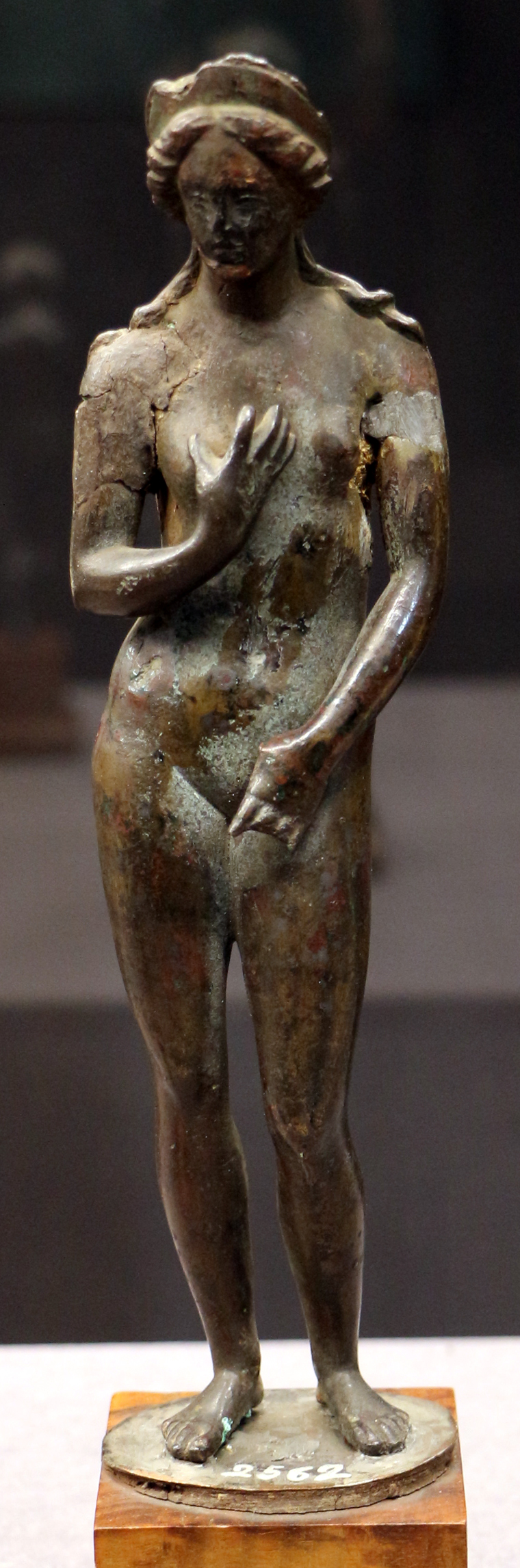
Bronze statuettes of a diademed Venus with the loose locks of the Anadyomene type: at left, jewelled from Baalbek, Roman Africa (1st–2nd century AD); at right, a pudica pose (ca. 150 AD, National Archaeological Museum, Florence)

According to Ovid, the cult image of Venus was bathed and redressed in the ritual act of lavatio. The goddess's rich adornments and gold necklaces were removed, and after she had been washed head to toe and polished dry, she was decked with not only her jewellery but also fresh roses and other flowers. Rose adornment was also part of the Vinalia, the wine festival on 23 April when Venus Erycina was celebrated. Ovid is the only source for Verticordia's lavatio, and the earliest for the bathing of the cult statue of the Magna Mater, which was carried to the river Almo during her festival 4–10 April, the Megalensia. Statue-bathing was not characteristic of early Roman religion; it may have served a practical purpose that was ritualized to preserve the sanctity of the image, or even been reconceptualized as an annual cleansing of offenses committed against the goddesses.

On the Kalends, matrons and brides were to supplicate Verticordia, seeking physical beauty, socially approved behaviors, and a good reputation, (Note: Ovid, Fasti 4.156: forma et mores et bona fama; the word for "brides" in the passage is nurus in a meaning extended from "daughter-in-law".) while women of lesser standing (mulieres humiliores) celebrated Fortuna Virilis by burning incense. The celebrants of Verticordia bathed communally, crowned in wreaths of myrtle, a plant especially associated with Venus and eroticism but not used in bridal wreaths. Ovid explains the origin (aetion) of myrtle-wearing with a brief version of the myth of Venus Anadyomene rising naked from the sea, recognizable as such in the poem by the "hair-drying pose" he describes. As she is wringing out her dripping hair on the shore, she becomes aware of a rowdy band of satyrs watching her. Unlike the usual myth in which an enraged goddess punishes the man who has seen her, (Note: Artistically, Ovid's description of the lavatio overtly echoes the Lautro Palladis ("Bath of Pallas"), Hymn 5 of Callimachus, in wording, meter, and imagery, including adornment with flowers and gold. But "the theme of prohibition central to the Bath of Pallas has been turned upside down". Pallas Athena is a virgin goddess, and Callimachus warns men not to look upon her, lest she strike them blind as she did the sex-changing seer Tiresias when he came upon her bathing. The hymn begins with her unharnessing her horses from her war chariot and showing care by washing them down, in contrast to the ominous, violent equine elements in Verticordia's myths. Despite the collocation of temples to Venus near the Circus Maximus, when Venus is depicted in a chariot, it is usually drawn by swans, doves, or even, in a wall painting from Pompeii showing the city's syncretized patron Venus in a chariot shaped like the prow of a boat, elephants. In the Thebaid of Statius, only Venus can delay the course of Mars' "seething chariot" when he sets off to make war.) Ovid's Venus simply covers herself with myrtle and goes about her pleasurable business. "Nakedness, baths, and female sexuality" form a kind of "expressive module" for the holiday. "The nakedness that lies at the center of this celebration is no taboo," Alessandro Barchiesi observed of Ovid's reassembling of the religious materials, but "is a public gesture" emulating the ancestress of the Romans as Aeneadae, (Note: Ovid, Fasti 4.161; towards the end of the Republican era, Lucretius opened his Epicurean poem De Rerum Natura by invoking Venus as the Aeneadum genetrix, begetter of the line of Aeneas.) descendants of Aeneas, son of Venus.

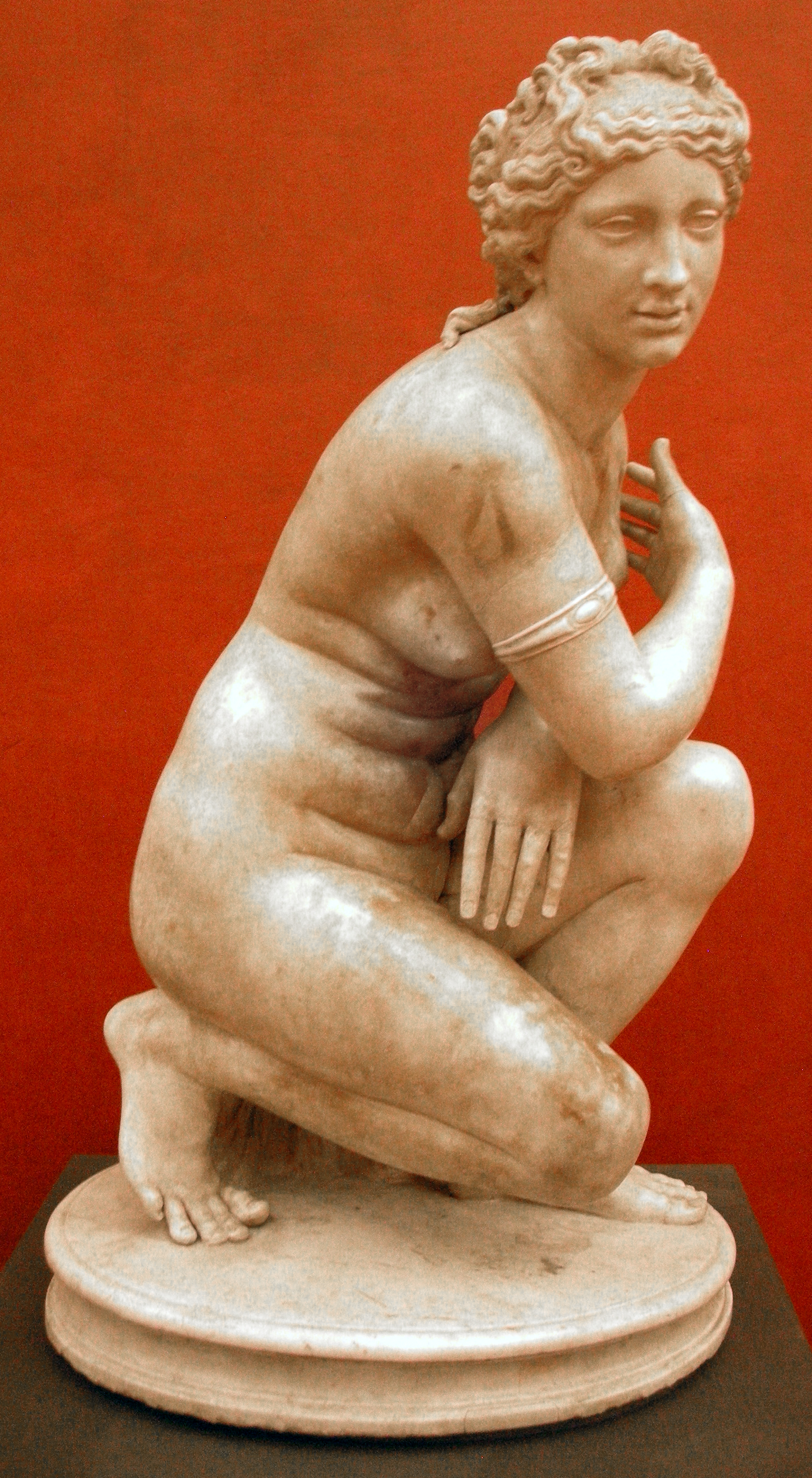
Crouching Venus variant on the goddess at her bath, here with jewellery, perhaps intended to gaze at her reflection in a pool

Participants also emulated Venus in consuming cocetum, a slurry of poppy seed, milk, and honey that served a ceremonial purpose similar to the kykeon of the Eleusinian Mysteries. The festival of Ceres – Greek Demeter for whom poppy was emblematic – began 12 April with games and performances in the Circus Maximus and concluded 19 April with the Cerialia. The poppy beverage may have helped relax or sedate anxious virgin brides, or had an aphrodisiac or more strongly narcotic or hallucinatory effect, depending on the opiate content of the poppy. Ovid offers another origin story for brides consuming the cocetum, saying that Venus herself drank it on her wedding night. But he undermines an image of Venus as a model wife with the sexuality of Venus as a woman, framing her feast day with reminders of Mars, her regular consort to whom she was not married. Ovid repeats in the Fasti a double entendre he had made in his Ars Amatoria ("The Art of Love") on how Mars "hooks up" with Venus on the Kalends of April, the day that joins his month of March to hers. On this day, Venus drank the cocetum to endure her wedding night, forced to marry the unattractive but eager bridegroom Vulcan. (Note: The joke about Venus and Mars cuckolding Vulcan is a Greek import, but in Roman literature it's at least as old as the comic playwright Naevius (3rd century BC).) Her son Aeneas, father of the Roman people, was born from her adulterous desire for the mortal Anchises.

The mutual desire of Mars and Venus being fundamental to the Roman state, their allegorization as the generative couple of Rome's founding, coupled with the high value Romans placed on a marriage between well-matched partners, eventually led to conceiving of Mars and Venus as married. The role of Venus Verticordia was not to inhibit sexuality but to promote libido within marriage, which Cicero described as "the seedbed of the republic" (seminarium rei publicae). About nine months after Venus's feast day on 1 April, the Carmentalia that celebrated the goddess of childbirth was celebrated for all women giving birth, and was a festival unusually without social stratification.

==== Fortuna Virilis and social organization ====
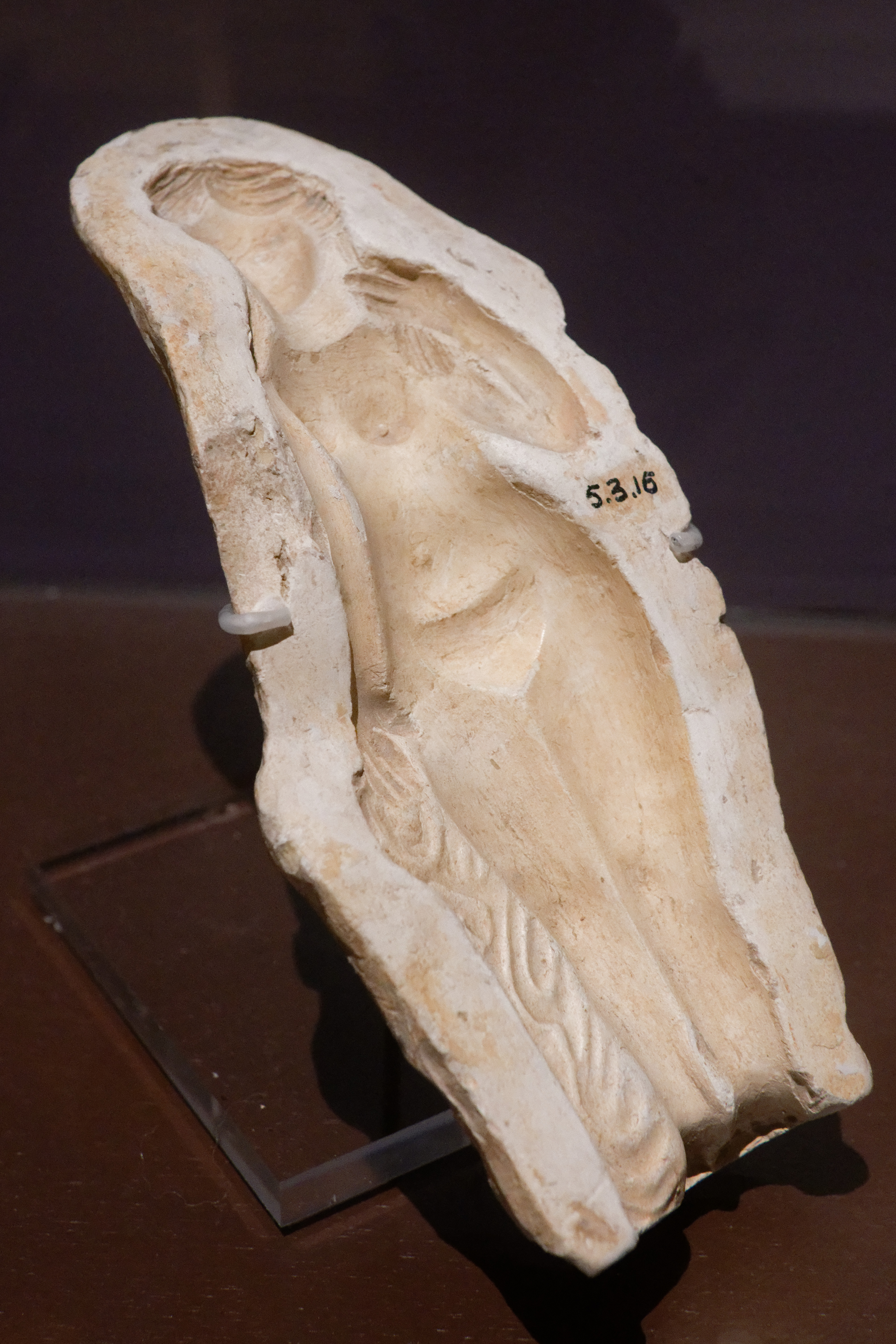
Gallo-Roman mold for manufacturing Venus terra cotta figurines

Ovid's artistic intermingling of Verticordia and Fortuna Virilis and his social commentary on the division of the celebrants is "notoriously controversial" and "puzzlingly paradigmatic" as a historical source. The relation of the two goddesses is difficult to disentangle, (Note: Molly Pasco-Pranger summarizes that "the rites of the two goddesses are inextricably entangled with one another in the tradition. Two possible interpretations of the calendrical coincidence of the festivals of the goddesses and the apparent cultic relationship between them present themselves: 1) The two cults are at base related in purpose and meaning and the coincidence of their dates expresses that relationship; 2) The two cults were originally unrelated and the coincidence of their dates caused them to be interpreted in relation to one another. Modern scholarship, though in general consensus that the two rites were related, is divided as to whether Venus or Fortuna was the original honoree of the festival, who took part in what rite, and what the rite(s) meant." In the early 20th century, William Warde Fowler and Uberto Pestalozza regarded the bath as a "fertility" ritual and Fortuna Virilis as the original goddess honored; in the mid-20th century, Robert Schilling, Charal Floratos, and Franz Bömer saw Venus as the primary honoree of the feast day. James Halporn (1976) states "the devotions of women to Fortuna Virilis on the Kalends have nothing to do with the cult of Venus. Fortuna Virilis is a counterpart to Fortuna Muliebris"; he sees the cult of Verticordia as having a broadly moralizing objective and the two goddesses as complementary and finds no "evidence that their cults were separated by class distinction." The comprehensive work on Fortuna by Jacqueline Champeaux in the 1980s supports Fortuna's priority. Ariadne Staples (1998) holds that "Fortuna Virilis … is nothing more than a cult title of Venus. It is not a name meant to denote a separate entity. Fortuna Virilis has the same force as Verticordia." Celia Schultz (2006) treats the Kalends of April as one of the days of "paired cults reinforcing marital and social divisions", with Anise Strong (2016) broadly agreeing that the two goddesses are distinct but that the participants in the rites are not rigidly segregated, except for certain privileges of elite women. T. P. Wiseman (2008) writes, "The construction of this complex passage [in Ovid's Fasti] makes it clear that the offering to Fortuna Virilis is an integral part of the Venus ritual … . It was a single ritual with two goddesses involved, no doubt the result of an ancient Fortuna cult being combined with Venus Verticordia in the third or second century BC.") and Venus and Fortuna in their varying manifestations had overlapping functions in early Roman religion, owing in part to their association in the legends of Servius Tullius, sixth king of Rome. The origins of Fortuna Virilis are no later than the 4th century BC, predating the dedication of Verticordia's statue, and Plutarch traces a temple of Fortuna Virilis back to Servius Tullius himself, to whom many such foundings were attributed.

The 1 April feast day was celebrated widely, perhaps universally, by Roman women, but ancient sources seem to indicate social segregation in what aspects they might participate in. The bathing and adornment of Verticordia's statue could involve only a limited number of women, and selectivity of merit was inherent in the establishment of her cult. The women who attended on her wore the respectable attire of the matron.

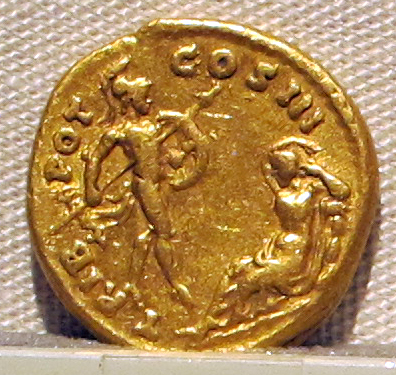
A nude Mars and clothed Venus on an aureus of Antoninus Pius (2nd century AD)

Women of lesser status attended to Fortuna Virilis, and then they – or perhaps all women (Note: Barchiesi and Wiseman hold that Ovid's Aeneadae indicates that in his time, at least, all women participated in public bathing, not just women of the lower classes. Wiseman conjectures, however, that matrons of the highest rank might bathe in the semi-public space of the domus, with the desired fecundation performed in the marital bed or lectus genialis in the atrium. Staples points to the phrase accipit ille locus … cunctas (Fasti 4.147, "that place [the baths] receives all"), with cunctae [mulieres] occupying the emphatic last position in the line.) – crowned themselves in myrtle like Venus and went to share a "fecundating" bath in public view of men, who watch as the satyrs did. Earlier in the Fasti, Ovid had used the word iuventus ("the youth" as a collective), which in this period often meant an elite troop of young men of the equestrian order, to refer to a band of satyrs subject to Venus. T. P. Wiseman conjectured that in the 4th century BC, the rites on the Kalends of April may even have involved men dressing as satyrs. The male gaze played an essential role in the rites of Fortuna Virilis and Venus Verticordia, though they were celebrated only by women – a marked contrast to most all-female cults, which excluded or religiously prohibited the presence of men.

In the late 4th century BC, public bathing might have taken place at the public pool (piscina publica), but the appearance of the women at the men's public baths has to be a later development, since these were not in use until the 2nd century BC. The name Fortuna Virilis means something closer to "Good Luck in Men" than "Manly Fortune", or "Lucky Guy" if the women's actions are meant as a "privileged exhibition" for the men – the women may be hesitant that taking off their clothes exposes physical imperfection, but that isn't what Fortuna Virilis lets men see. Ovid's contemporary Verrius Flaccus emphasizes that male desire is exposed as well at the baths, "because in them men are naked in that part of the body where the favor of women is desired".

=== In the era of Christianization ===
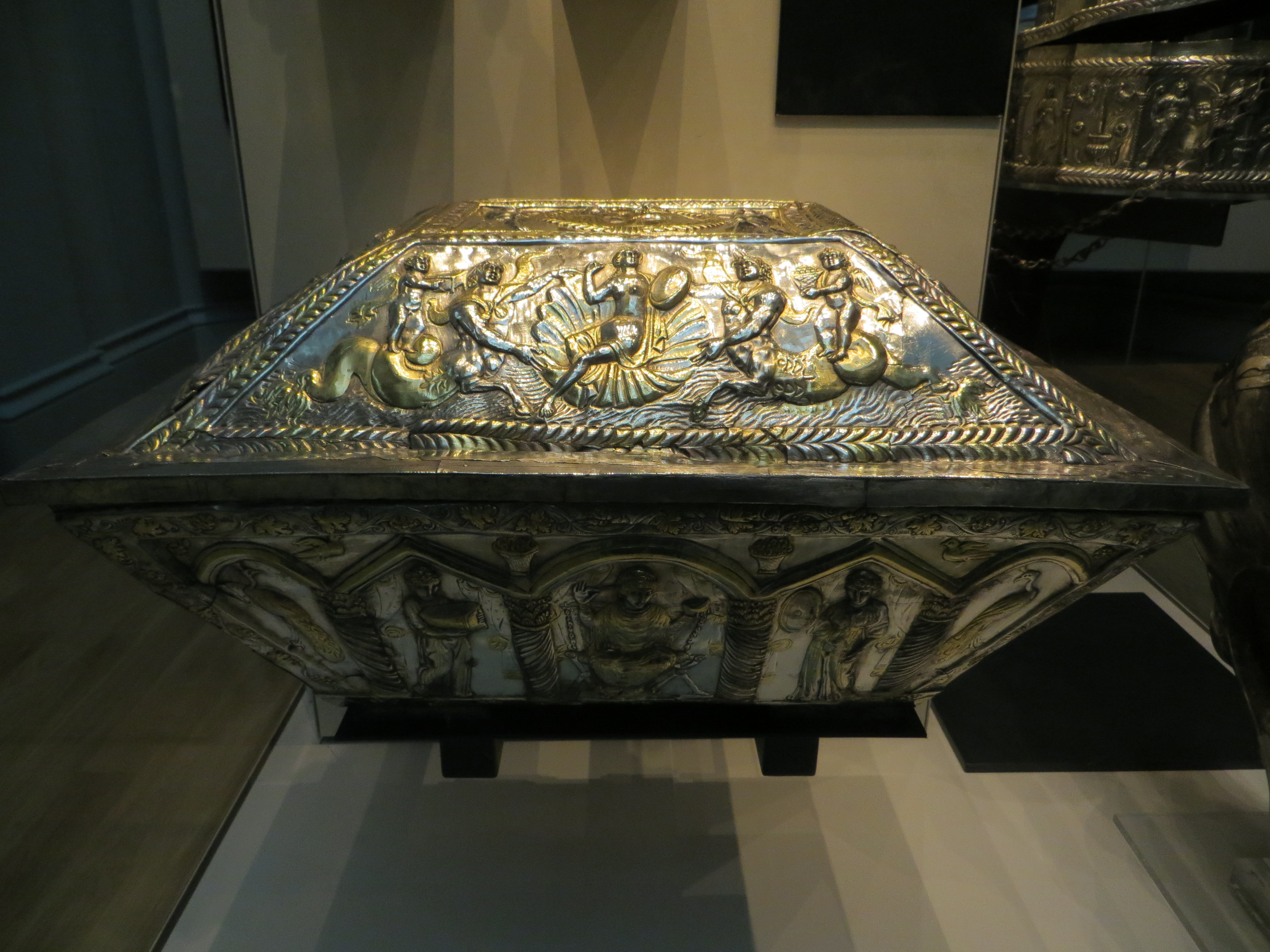
The bridal casket (ca. 380 AD) from the Esquiline Treasure found in Rome, with Venus Anadyomene on the top echoed in the imagery of the bride Projecta below, and a Christian inscription (British Museum)

By the early second century AD, the rituals of Fortuna Virilis seem to have been absorbed into the cult of Venus Verticordia. By late antiquity, the drinking of cocetum and practices associated with Fortuna Virilis appear to have fallen into disuse, but celebrations on the Kalends continued to serve the purpose of Verticordia in promoting conjugal life. The name Veneralia for the festival on 1 April first appears in AD 354 in the Calendar of Filocalus, the work of a Christian illustrator and chronographer that integrates Christian elements into the traditional Roman calendar. A temple of Venus, possibly that of Verticordia, was restored at Rome even in the latter 4th century, after Christian laws banning certain religious practices under the catchall label "paganism" were coming into effect.

As an example of how mythological imagery could be adapted by Christians, the bridal casket from the Esquiline Treasure, dating to around 380 AD, mirrors an image of Venus Anadyomene in depicting the bride, with a similar composition of the scene and the pose of the central figure. An inscription enjoins the newlyweds to live in Christ. Venus is attended by the marine thiasos that more commonly surrounds Poseidon-Neptune. A centaurotriton presents Venus with a convex mirror gripped like a shield as a servant holds up a similar but flat or concave mirror for the bride below. The Venus scene is framed by winged Cupids and the bride's toilette by peacocks.

The Veneralia may have been the setting Augustine of Hippo had in mind in a sermon on Mary and Martha, dated to AD 393, when he writes that "we" should not get carnally distracted by "banquets of Venus" (epulae venerales) (Note: The usual adjectival form of Venus in Classical Latin was venereus, and Augustine is conscious of using venerales as a stylistic choice: nec venerales, ut ita dicam, epulas cogitemus ("and not dwell on banquets of Venus, as I might put it"). The only other known use of veneralis in antiquity is the name of the festival in the neuter plural, Veneralia, which first appears likewise in the 4th century as a precedent.) but practice moderate behavior (modestia). Augustine advised forbearance, not passion, as a way to approach the secular banquet of Venus, which he seems to regard as "rather a respectable affair in 'celebration of a life of harmony and fullness'". The 6th-century antiquarian Ioannes Lydus, writing in Greek, says that women of higher rank had worshipped Aphrodite on 1 April "to achieve concord (homonoia) and a modest life", with no mention of Fortuna Virilis.

== Relation to other goddesses ==
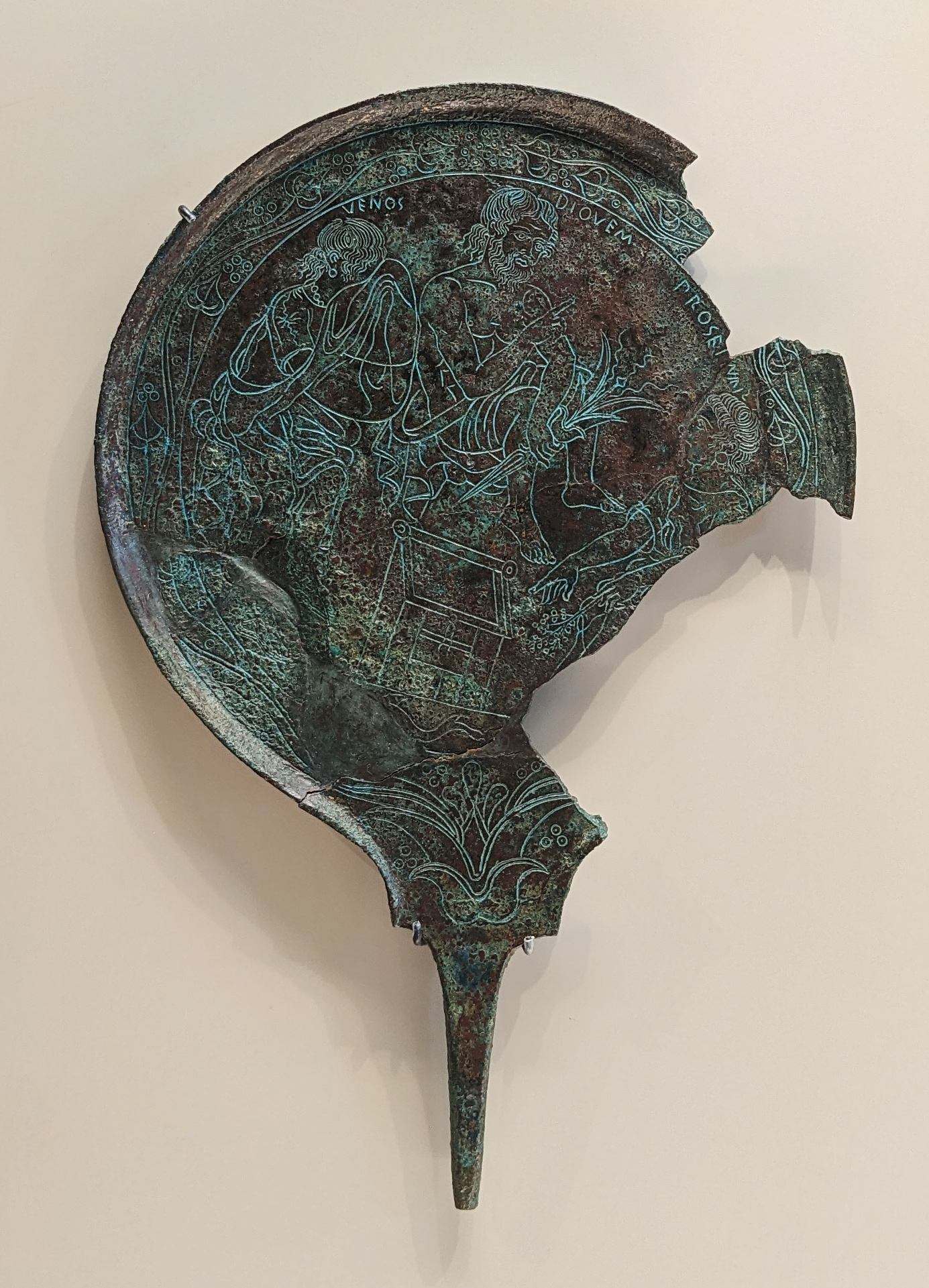
The oldest evidence for Venus depicts her with Proserpina in a custody dispute over the infant Adonis before Jove, holding a lightning bolt, on a mirror from Praeneste (375–350 BC)

In the associations made among goddesses in the April book of the Fasti, Ovid's underlying theology is consonant with that of Varro, who wrote at the end of the Republic and into the reign of Augustus. For Varro, the apparent tensions among deities were dynamic functional alignments. Venus, Ceres, and Cybele were mother goddesses who were also concerned in their manifold ways with the chastity and virginity that Vesta embodied. The rape of Ceres' daughter Proserpina is a pivotal moment of transformation, "the essential union of male and female by violence"; Varro states flatly that "a woman does not cease to be a virgin without violence".

Venus herself "is the force of conjunction that leads to generation". The coniunctio (connection, union, conjunction) of Venus integrates the range of women's experiences; Vesta is concerned with virginity in isolation, the rites and myths of Ceres have no place for prostitutes, and matrons have little to do with Flora, whose festival ends the month of April and continues into May. But all women find a power in Venus, through whom the expiation of sexual excesses can occur. In presiding over the turning of the heart, Venus Verticordia is pivotal in negotiating a woman's own independent desire, either libido or the effort to remain intact apart from a man's desire, in relation to the realities of male violence and subjection of women.

=== Venus Erycina and the cults of Pudicitia ===
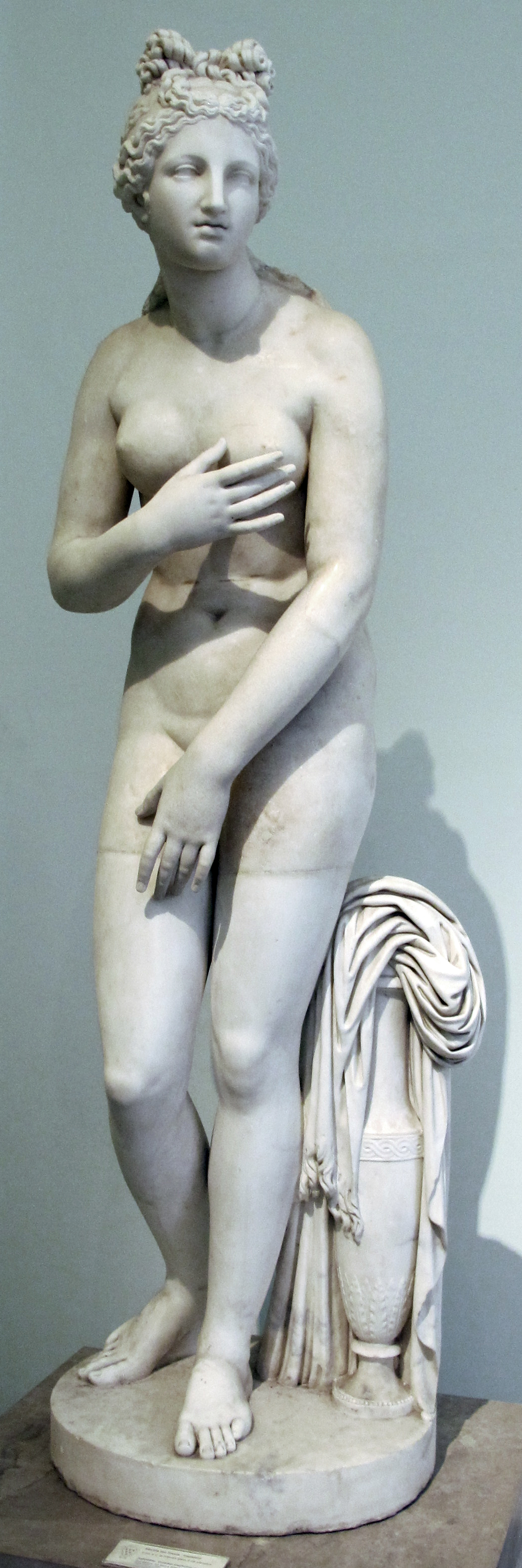
Venus Pudica of the Capitoline type, with hydria (2nd century AD)

In the month of Venus, on 23 April, a day comparable to the Greek Aphrodisia festival was devoted to Venus Erycina extra portam Collinam, "Venus of Eryx outside the Colline Gate" and hence outside the sacred boundary of Rome (pomerium) as foreign rites traditionally were. Sex workers (meretrices) attended while socially respectable women celebrated the same goddess with "cleaned up" rites at the Vinalia festival on the Capitoline. The lower-class women (mulieres humiliores) who celebrated Fortuna Virilis on the Kalends of April would have included prostitutes as well. Sarah Pomeroy believed that the humiliores comprised only prostitutes, but this is not standard usage of the word, and Ovid undermines even the usual social distinction between the humiliores and women of the upper social orders (Note: In the later Roman Empire, starting at the end of the 2nd century AD, a distinction arose in Roman society between honestiores and humiliores, with those who had achieved decurial rank or above accorded privileges by law and those of humble birth subjected to penalties and debilities once reserved for slaves. This legally codified distinction existed only in a loose social sense during the Republic and Principate, when in theory at least all citizens held the same rights, with freeborn male citizens exercising privileges in public life. The use of the word humiliores in Ovid and Verrius Flaccus has a more general sense of common, humble, not elite, not upper class.) in the inclusivity of the 1 April festivities.

Venus Erycina was a Punic cult imported from Sicily, and her temple was built as the result of a wartime vow, most likely in 212 BC at the close of the Siege of Syracuse which gave Rome control of the island. At her temple on the Capitoline, Erycina was eventually assimilated to Venus Genetrix, Venus as the generative mother of the Roman people, a moral amelioration of Erycina that indicates "prostitution was not the only item in her portfolio." The development of Erycina's cult shows the counterbalancing of an ideation of sexual women as whores by advancing the more self-controlled form of sexuality (pudicitia) for women within marriage, which Verticordia also embodied.

The social separation between Fortuna Virilis and Venus Verticordia, and between the two temples of Venus Erycina, had played out earlier in similar dynamic tension as the Conflict of the Orders sought resolution. A patrician woman had married a plebeian and consequently was deemed ineligible to participate in the cult of Pudicitia Patricia, "Pudicitia for Patricians". In response, she established a shrine to Pudicitia Plebeia as an alternative for socially aspiring plebeians in 295 BC. Pudicitia was the public moral arena in which women competed as men did in virtus, "manly" excellence. Only univirae, married women who had been with only one man, could be admitted to either cult of Pudicitia, emphasizing a woman's success at the self-management of her own sexuality beyond social expectations or male desire. The shrines of both Pudicitia Plebeia and Venus Verticordia were established in response to prodigies at a time of crisis in the Roman state; it is a frequent pattern that repairing social disorder required the public demonstration of the sexual and moral integrity of Roman women.

=== Murcia and the myrtle ===
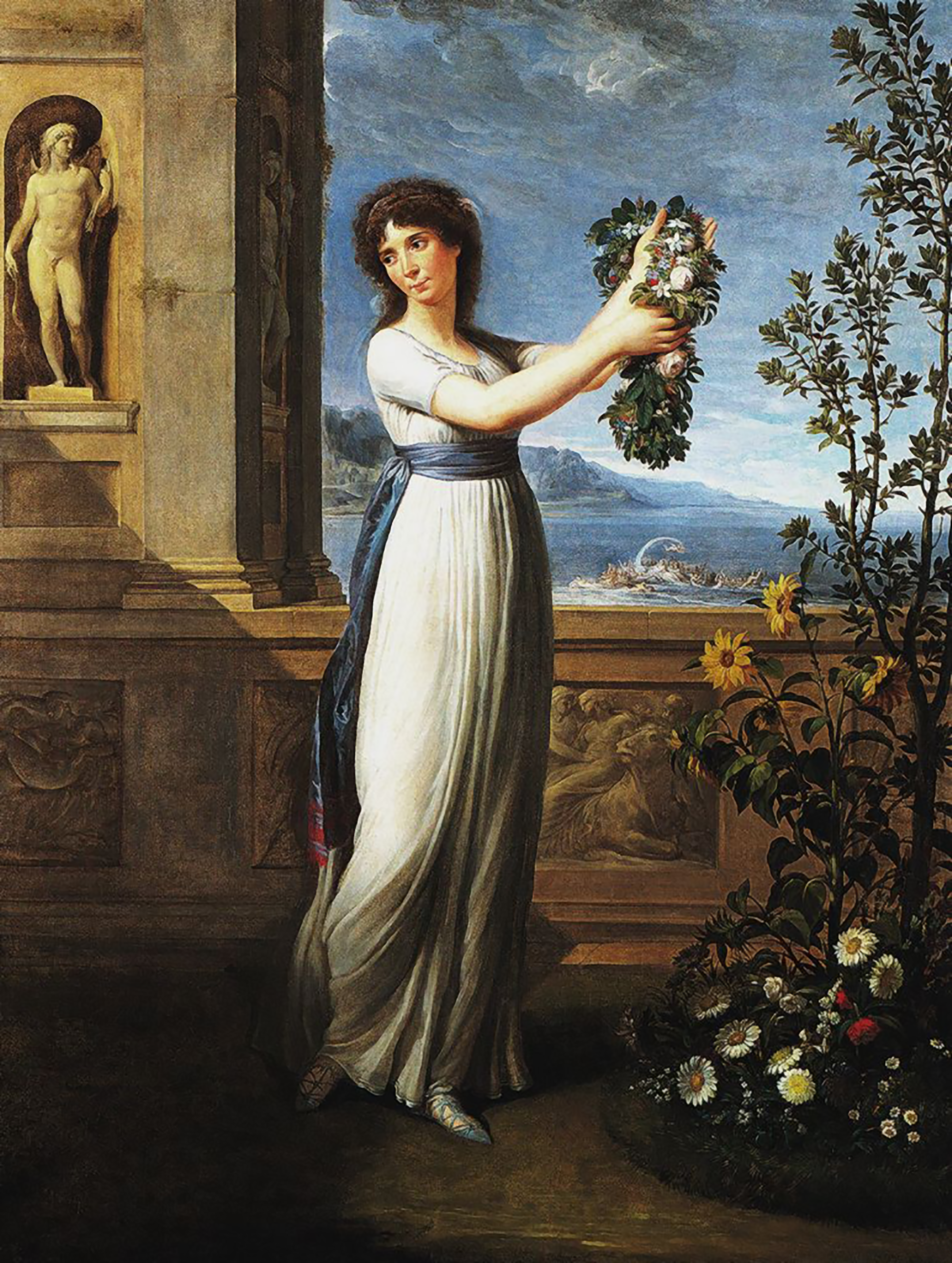
The myrtle continued to represent marital/martial Venus in the Classical tradition: in Andrea Appiani's Joséphine Bonaparte Crowning a Myrtle Tree (1796), painted soon after her marriage and the Battle of Lodi, the wife of Napoleon adorns a myrtle tree with a wreath that mingles the flowers of Venus with the laurel and oak of a conqueror, in a classicizing setting

The location of the Temple of Venus Verticordia in the Vallis Murcia also raises questions about her relation to the obscure goddess Murcia, the varied spelling of whose name led to her identification with Venus Murtea or Myrtea, "Venus of the Myrtle Grove".

Servius says that Verticordia's temple precinct (fanum) was near the Circus Maximus in a former myrtle grove, which was also the site of the Rape of the Sabine Women. As a pretext for the founding act of bride abduction, Romulus had invited the Sabine families to a festival in honor of the god named by Plutarch as Poseidon Hippios ("Horse Poseidon"), Latinized as Neptunus Equester ("Equestrian Neptune") and identified with the archaic god Consus. The underground altar of Consus was located at one of the two points of the Circus Maximus where the chariots turned, the metae Murciae, near the myrtle grove. In earliest times, the site was largely flooded by the Tiber river in April, a terrain supporting the conceptualization of Venus rising from the "sea" among the myrtles, but in the driest months, the area was devoted to horse races, especially in August, when Venus's second wine festival of the year was held on the 19th, two days before the horse-racing festival of Consus.

In the Ars Amatoria, Ovid had characterized the Sabine abduction as a crime of artless violence to "be redeemed … as a kind of ritual between the sexes." Livy and Dionysius have Romulus reassure the abducted virgins that the intention is marriage for the purpose of building society, not an outrage against their person. At the end of hostilities, both the Sabines and the newcomer Romans laid down their arms and used myrtle wands to purge their violence. Myrtle more broadly signified Venus as a force arising "not from mere longing but from some impulse of capture" or intention (mens), (Note: Wagenvoort argues that the archaic meaning of the originally neuter noun venus as a force – sometimes that of an aestus (a surge, seething heat, tide) – is why the goddess can encompass such disparate deities as Mefitis (whom Vergil, Aeneid 7.568ff., associated with Erinys), Libitina, and Cloacina, which to the modern mind sit ill at ease with the conception of a charming or seductive Venus.) as indicated by the awarding of a wreath of Venus's myrtle to generals who earned an ovation. (Note: The first to receive the myrtle of ovation was Publius Postumius Tubertus in 503 BC, for a victory against the Sabines: Pliny, Natural History 15.125 (38).) In an extended passage on myrtle, including several magico-medical uses, Pliny notes that rings crafted from myrtle twigs "virgin" to the touch of iron cure the swelling of genitals.

In Ovid's etiology of practices on the Kalends of April, Venus's use of myrtle wards off the potential for violence in the male gaze of the satyrs, mediating the sexual antagonism associated with the Vallis Murcia – the men can still look, but on Venus's terms. The myrtle is a screen that makes Venus safe (tuta), and by extension the women who wear her myrtle. The vatic poet of the Fasti is himself allowed to observe the rites of Venus and to speak of them only after the goddess "lightly touched his temples with myrtle".

=== Demeter, Bona Dea, and Aphrodite Apostrophia ===
The Greek equivalent of Verticordia, Aphrodite Apostrophia ("Aphrodite of Turning Away" (Note: "The Rejector" in the 1918 Loeb Classical Library translation.)) was complementary to Demeter Erinys. The April rites of Roman Ceres were not based on the primary Greek myth of Demeter – the abduction of her daughter Persephone to serve as the bride of Pluto – and yet Ovid chooses to narrate it at disproportionate length in his treatment of April in the Fasti. This choice may have been motivated by the complex nexus in Greek myth and cult between Demeter Erinys and Aphrodite Apostrophia. Demeter Erinys ("Furious Demeter") represents the rightful anger the goddess felt after she herself was raped during her search for her daughter, having turned herself into a mare to try to evade Poseidon only to have him transform into a stallion to mount her. (Note: Pausanias (8.25.4–7) records that Demeter Erinys had a cult at Thelpusa, where she was regarded as the mother of the mythological horse Arion, having been forcibly impregnated by Poseidon in the form of a stallion, one of several versions of Arion's genealogy. Her cult may have involved initiatory rites.) Erinys is the drive for vengeance, rendered into lawfulness by Demeter Thesmophoros ("Bringer of Laws", thesmoi) who preserves family order and the state. Although Demeter's Thesmophoria is framed broadly as an all-female "fertility" festival, the second day became a "forum for crime detection and dispute resolution" pervaded by the complaint of the wronged goddess.

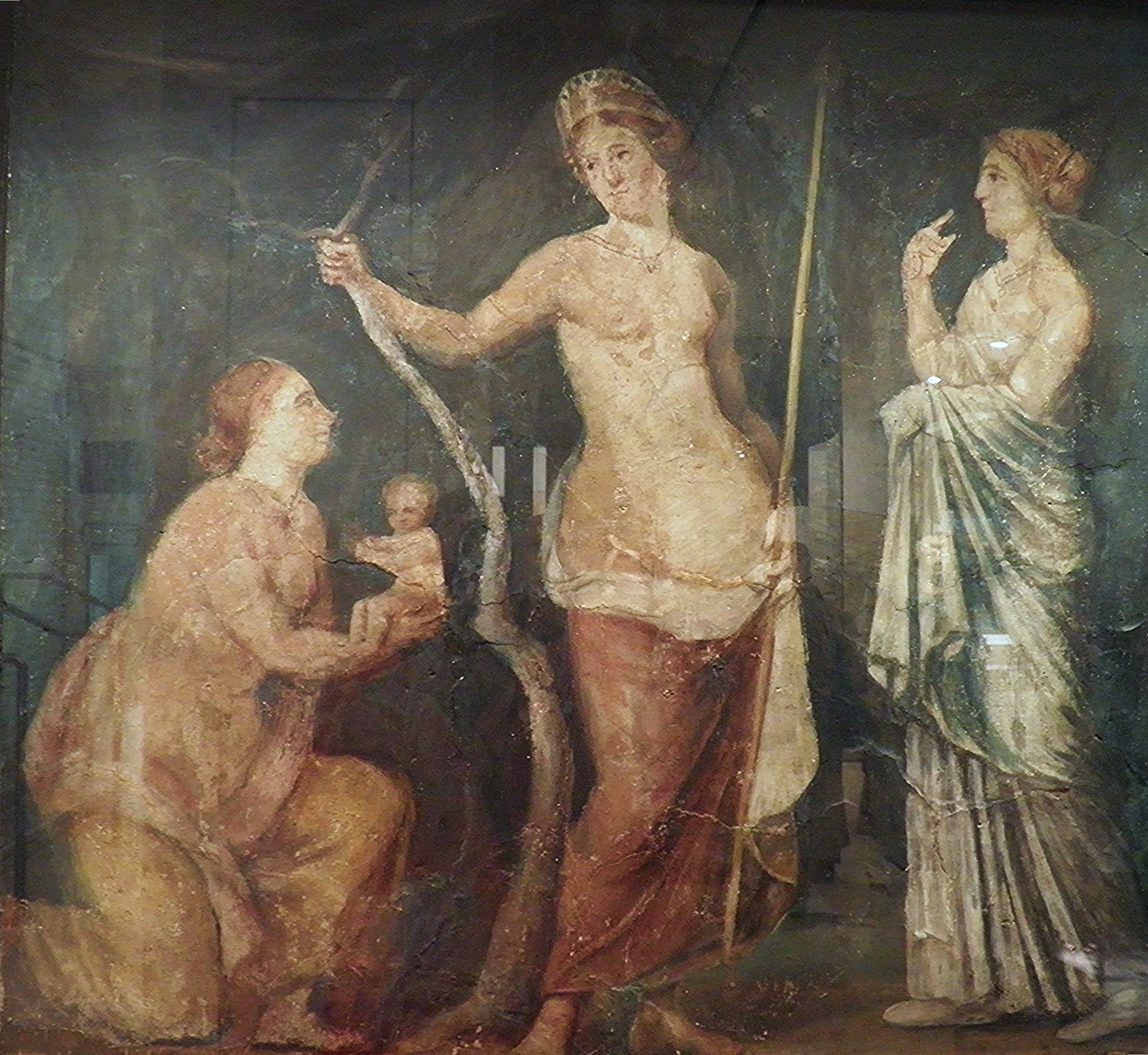
Venus presented with the infant Adonis as she holds the myrrh tree into which his mother had been turned to escape incest (1st-century wall painting from the Domus Aurea)

The animalizing potential of desire is "turned away" by Aphrodite Apostrophia (from apo-, "away" and strophein, "to turn") – so called because she diverted the human race from acting on desires that were contrary to nomos (ἐπιθυμίας τε ἀνόμου) and from unholy deeds (ἔργων ἀνοσίων). As examples of wrongly turned desire to be averted by Apostrophia, Pausanias cites the rape committed by Tereus, who cut out his victim's tongue so she couldn't speak; Phaedra, who tried to seduce her stepson and then accused him of rape when he spurned her; (Note: Phaedra was the daughter of Pasiphaë, who disguised herself as a cow so she could be mounted by a bull; transgressions involving Aphrodite ran in the family.) and the incestuous desire of Myrrha for her father, which produced the beautiful youth Adonis, unsatisfactorily loved by both Aphrodite and Persephone. (Note: Pausanias (9.16.3–4) describes three wooden statues of Aphrodite at Thebes that were said to be of such great antiquity that they had been votive offerings of Harmonia (Roman Concordia, though Iohannes Lydus associates the Aphrodite of the Kalends with the quality of Homonoia), the wife of the legendary Theban founder Cadmus. Apostrophia was one of the three. For the depiction of Venus and Mars in the Thebaid, Statius draws on the tradition of the Theban Aphrodite and Ares, to whom had been transferred earlier functions of Demeter and Poseidon. In the Theban tradition, Venus was the mother of Harmonia.) In his treatment of Venus Verticordia, Ovid averts his own eyes from these kinds of stories and sublimates the historical circumstances of her cult founding: he omits the prodigy of the scorched equestrian virgin Helvia, the Vestals' incestum that led to the founding of Verticordia's temple, and the horror of human sacrifice as joint expiation, as if complicit in the cover-up of Venus.

Incest plays a role in one version of how the Roman Bona Dea, whose rites seem most comparable to the Thesmophoria, became a goddess. In most tellings, she is deified after her husband, Faunus, beats her with a myrtle branch – in one account, to death – when he finds her drinking wine, but Macrobius has her as his daughter, whom he beats with myrtle when she refuses sex even though he has plied her with wine. In the hands of Faunus, who in the later tradition is often depicted with satyr-like features, the myrtle of Venus becomes an instrument for "excessive erotic desire". Both men and myrtle were banned from Bona Dea's rites, and her temple was situated on the slope of the Aventine, above the Valley of Myrtle where the "horsey" Neptune had presided over the abduction of the Sabine virgins.

In Verticordia's mythology, the threat of bestial sexuality is represented by the satyrs in Ovid's account of Venus's bath, and by the prodigy of the horse-riding virgin, whose body is found with signs that ordinarily might be interpreted as rape. The German philologist Carl Koch suggested that the Sibylline consultation calling for a temple to Venus Verticordia might have directly prescribed the model of Apostrophia, as was the case with some other transferrals of Greek or other deities to Rome.

=== The nudity of Venus ===
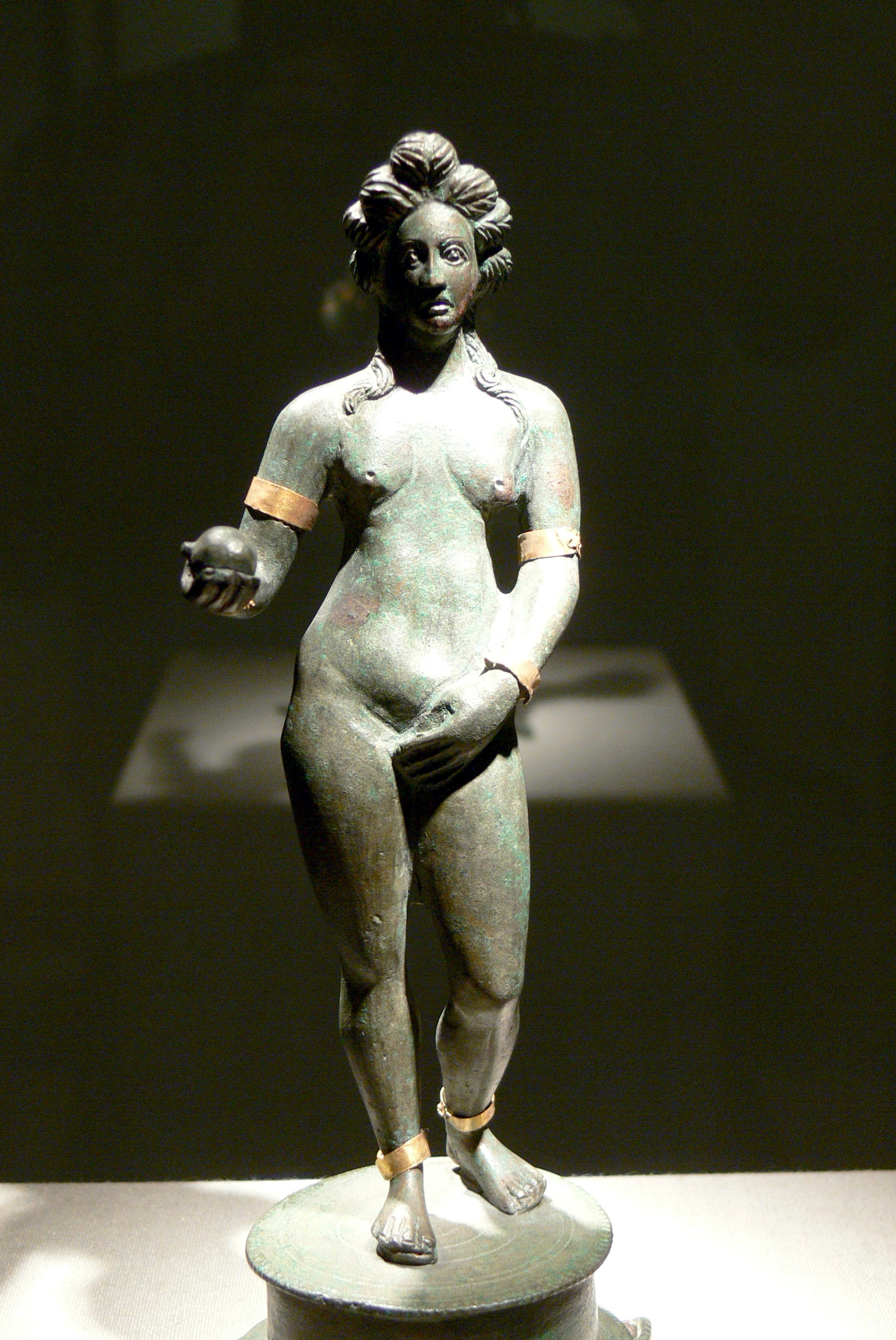
Bronze statuette of a multi-braceleted Venus (2nd/3rd century AD, Roman Museum of Weißenburg in Bayern)

The feast day of Venus Verticordia was one of two April holidays featuring the public nudity of women, the second being stage performances at the Floralia that started at the end of the month and continued into May. For the Floralia, however, the bodies of entertainers and prostitutes were on display; on the Kalends, even respectable matrons removed the garments that marked them as such, the long dress (stola) that covered them to their feet and the headbands (vittae) that bound their hair. Valerius Maximus attributed a kind of inviolability to the stola, stating that it was not to be subjected to the touch of an "alien" hand (Note: Valerius Maximus 2.1.5b: inviolata manus alienae tactu stola relinqueretur.) – meaning someone outside the family – even if the matron came under arrest. The unwilling removal of the protective garment would be a violation, but its willing removal and the reclaiming of the nude body held power: "Like the Gorgon's eye, it can paralyze or protect." Although female nudity among the Archaic and Classical Greeks had been taboo, "respectable female nudity" was imported into Italy via the Etruscans and took the form of Hellenistic Aphrodite.

The Venus Pudica statuary type displays the goddess naked, and the placement of her hands is not obviously defensive but rather instructs the viewer toward the erogenous zones of the female body. The sometime presence of a cloth or drapery is ambiguous as to whether Pudica has just removed her garment or is about to put it on, and in some versions, such as the Mazarin Venus (at the top of this article), suggests a striptease. The ancient calendars that illustrate April with a statue of Venus show her in the pudica or anadyomene poses. The apparent erasure of social rank in emulating the nude Venus was renegotiated by the practice of wearing jewellery in the baths, as modeled by the bejewelling of these nude statues and documented by archaeological finds in the drains.

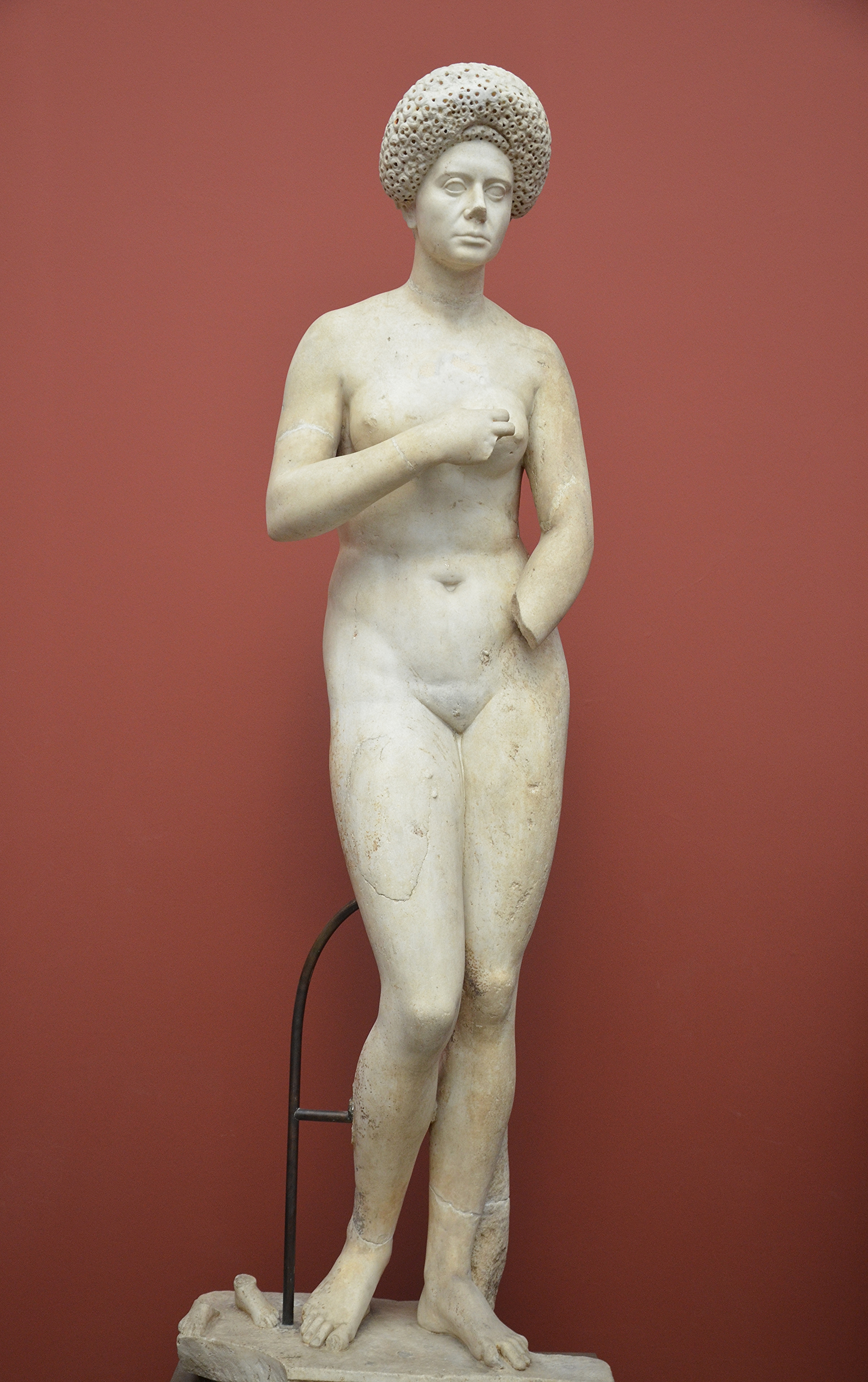
Roman woman with a Flavian-era hairstyle portrayed as Venus Pudica (98–117 CE)

Both the Venus Anadyomene and Pudica types are associated with rising from the water, sometimes indicated by a hydria (water vessel) or dolphin, with bathing a reenactment of the goddess's birth from the sea. Ovid's description of Venus with dripping hair for the Kalends of April may have been inspired by a painting in the anaydomene pose that Augustus had exhibited in the Temple of the Deified Julius. Pudica, however, is well coiffed. Roman matrons were not portrayed with the loose, wet locks of Anadyomene, which released an eroticism that might not be fully under control; elaborately bound-up hairstyles were not simply ornamental but "upright" in the moral sense. The polymath Varro said that the piled-up hairstyle of Roman matrons was called a tutulus from the word tutus, "safe", and was also nicknamed an arx, like the citadel of the city – just as functionally the cult of Verticordia was established for matrons to safeguard the city after the Vestal Virgins failed in that role. And just as women reenacted the role of Venus in the rites of 1 April, they were portrayed quite literally as Venus in sculpture, with their own portrait head placed on a conventional body type of the goddess – a costly form of self-expression available only to those who could afford it, from the wives of emperors to successful freedwomen. Although nude, their portraits exhibit "flawless reserve and self-possession".

== See also ==
- Venus Verticordia (1868), an allegorical Pre-Raphaelite painting by Dante Gabriel Rossetti
- Dea Viriplaca, the husband-pleasing goddess

== Sources ==
- Andrews, Margaret M. (2019). "Review of Prostitutes and Matrons in the Roman World by Anise K. Strong". Classical Philology. 114 (3): 529–537. doi:10.1086/702922. JSTOR 26850719.
- Babelon, Ernest (1885). Description historique et chronologique des monnaies de la République romaine. Rollin & Feuardent.
- Barchiesi, Alessandro (1997). The Poet and the Prince: Ovid and Augustan Discourse. University of California Press.
- Bergman, Bettina (2018). "At Face Value: Painted Ladies on Pompeiian Walls". In Longfellow, Brenda; Perry, Ellen E. (eds.). Roman Artists, Patrons, and Public Consumption: Familiar Works Reconsidered. University of Michigan Press. pp. 142–166.
- Blythe, Barbara (2018). "Apples to Apples: Forbidden Fruit in Petronius's Cena Trimalchionis". Transactions of the American Philological Association. 148 (2): 393–419. JSTOR 26695498.
- Boatwright, Mary T. (2011). "Women and Gender in the Forum Romanum". Transactions of the American Philological Association. 141 (1): 105–141. doi:10.1353/apa.2011.0007. JSTOR 41289737.
- Bömer, Franz [in German] (1958). P. Ovidius Naso. Die Fasten, Band II (in German). Carl Winter.
- Bonfante, Larissa (1989). "Nudity as a Costume in Classical Art". American Journal of Archaeology. 93 (4): 543–570. doi:10.2307/505328. JSTOR 505328.
- Bowden, Hugh (2009). "Cults of Demeter Eleusinia and the Transmission of Religious Ideas". In Malkin, Irad; Constantakopoulou, Christy; Panagopoulou, Katerina (eds.). Greek and Roman Networks in the Mediterranean. Routledge.
- Bowers, Susan R. (1990). "Medusa and the Female Gaze". NWSA Journal. 2 (2): 217–235. JSTOR 4316018.
- Brouwer, H. H. J. (1989). Bona Dea: The Sources and a Description of the Cult. Brill.
- Cavedoni, Celestino (1829). Saggio di osservazioni sopra alcune medaglie di famiglie romane (in Italian). Eredi Soliani.
- Clark, Jessica H. (2014). Triumph in Defeat: Military Loss and the Roman Republic. Oxford University Press.
- Coarelli, Filippo (2008). Rome and Environs: An Archaeological Guide. University of California Press.
- Crawford, Michael (1974). Roman Republican Coinage. Cambridge University Press.
- Culham, Phyllis (1982). "The Lex Oppia". Latomus. 41 (4): 786–793. JSTOR 41532685.
- D'Ambra, Eve (1996). "The Calculus of Venus: Nude Portraits of Roman Matrons". In Kampen, Nathalie Boymel (ed.). Sexuality in Ancient Art: Near East, Egypt, Greece, and Italy. Cambridge Studies in New Art History and Criticism. Cambridge University Press. pp. 219–232.
- D'Ambra, Eve (2020). "Is Beauty Divine? A Reassessment of the Portraiture of Sabina". Memoirs of the American Academy in Rome. 65: 132–171. doi:10.2307/27031297. JSTOR 27031297.
- de Grummond, Nancy Thomson (2004). "For the Mother and for the Daughter: Some Thoughts on Dedications from Etruria and Praeneste". Hesperia. 33: 351–370. JSTOR 1354077.
- DiLuzio, Meghan J. (2016). A Place at the Altar: Priestesses in Republican Rome. Princeton University Press.
- Eckstein, Arthur M. (2012). "Polybius, the Gallic Crisis, and the Ebro Treaty". Classical Philology. 107 (3): 206–229. doi:10.1086/665622. JSTOR 10.1086/665622.
- Eden, P. T. (1963). "Venus and the Cabbage". Hermes. 91 (4): 448–459. JSTOR 4475274.
- Estienne, Sylvia (2006). "Images et culte: pratiques 'romaines' / influences 'orientales'". In Bonnet, Corinne; Rüpke, Jörg; Scarpi, Paolo (eds.). Religions orientales – culti misterici. Potsdamer Altertumswissenschaftliche Beiträge (in French). Vol. 16. Franz Steiner. pp. 147–158.
- Fantham, Elaine (1998). Fantham, Elaine (ed.). Ovid: Fasti Book IV. Cambridge Greek and Latin Classics. Cambridge University Press. doi:10.1017/CBO9781139163767. ISBN 978-0-521-44538-2.
- Fantham, Elaine (2002a). "The Fasti as a Source for Women's Participation in Roman Cult". In Herbert-Brown, Geraldine (ed.). Ovid's Fasti: Historical Readings at Its Bimillennium. Oxford University Press. pp. 23–46.
- Fantham, Elaine (2002b). "Ovid's Fasti: Politics, History, and Religion". In Weiden Boyd, Barbara (ed.). Brill's Companion to Ovid. Brill. pp. 197–234.
- Fantham, Elaine (2011). Roman Readings: Roman Response to Greek Literature from Plautus to Statius and Quintilian. De Gruyter.
- Faraone, Christopher A. (2011). "Curses, Crime Detection and Conflict Resolution at the Festival of Demeter Thesmophoros". Journal of Hellenic Studies. 131: 25–44. doi:10.1017/S0075426911000036. JSTOR 41722131.
- Floratos, Charal (1960). "Veneralia". Hermes (in German). 88 (2): 197–216. JSTOR 4475113.
- Grandazzi, Alexandre (1997). The Foundation of Rome: Myth and History. Cornell University Press.
- Green, C. M. C. (2002). "Varro's Three Theologies and their Influence on the Fasti". In Herbert-Brown, Geraldine (ed.). Ovid's Fasti: Historical Readings at Its Bimillennium. Oxford University Press. pp. 71–100.
- Grimal, Pierre (1986). Love in Ancient Rome. Translated by Arthur Train Jr. University of Oklahoma Press.
- Gruen, Erich S. (1968). "M. Antonius and the Trial of the Vestal Virgins". Rheinisches Museum für Philologie. 111 (1): 59–63. JSTOR 41244355.
- Halporn, James (1976). "Saint Augustine Sermon 104 and the Epulae Veneris". Jahrbuch für Antike und Christentum. 19: 82–108.
- Harries, Jill (2007). Law and Crime in the Roman World. Cambridge University Press.
- Hooey, A. J. (1937). "Rosaliae signorum". Harvard Theological Review. 30 (1): 15–35. doi:10.1017/S0017816000022124. JSTOR 1508289.
- Hudson, Jared (2016). "Carpento certe: Conveying Gender in Roman Transportation". Classical Antiquity. 35 (2): 215–246. doi:10.1525/ca.2016.35.2.215. JSTOR 26362670.
- Humphrey, John H. (1986). Roman Circuses: Arenas for Chariot Racing. University of California Press.
- Jost, Madeleine (2007). "The Religious System in Arcadia". In Ogden, Daniel (ed.). A Companion to Greek Religion. Blackwell Companions to the Ancient World. Blackwell. pp. 264–280.
- Kaufmann, Jean-Claude [in French] (2011). The Curious History of Love. Translated by David Macey. Polity.
- Kelsen, Hans (1943). Society and Nature: A Sociological Inquiry. University of Chicago Press.
- Kiefer, Otto (1934). Sexual Life in Ancient Rome. Translated by Gilbert and Helen Highet. Routledge. ISBN 9780710307019.
- King, Richard Jackson (2006). Desiring Rome: Male Subjectivity and Reading Ovid's Fasti. Ohio State University Press.
- Koch, Carl (1955). "Untersuchungen zur Geschichte der Römischen Venus-Verehrung". Hermes (in German). 83 (1): 1–51.
- Kraemer, Rose Shepard (1992). Her Share of the Blessings: Women's Religions among Pagans, Jews, and Christians in the Greco-Roman World. Oxford University Press.
- Labate, Mario (2007). "Erotic Aetiology: Romulus, Augustus, and the Rape of the Sabine Women". In Green, Steven (ed.). The Art of Love: Bimillennial Essays on Ovid's Ars Amatoria and Remedia Amoris. Oxford University Press. pp. 193–215.
- Langlands, Rebecca (2006). Sexual Morality in Ancient Rome. Cambridge University Press.
- Lazzaro, Claudia (1991). "The Visual Language of Gender in Sixteenth-Century Garden Sculpture". In Migiel, Marilyn; Schiesari, Juliana (eds.). Refiguring Women: Perspectives on Gender and the Italian Renaissance. Cornell University Press. pp. 71–113.
- Lee, Mireille M. (2015). Body, Dress, and Identity in Ancient Greece. Cambridge University Press.
- Lerner, Judith (1996). "Horizontal-Handled Mirrors: East and West". Metropolitan Museum Journal. 31: 11–40. doi:10.2307/1512970. JSTOR 1512970.
- Magini, Leonardo (1996). Le Feste di Venere: Fertilità femminile e configurazioni astrali and calendario di Roman antica (in Italian). «L'ERMA» di Bretschneider.
- Markus, R. A. (1990). The End of Ancient Christianity. Cambridge University Press.
- Matthews, J. F. (1970). "The Historical Setting of the Carmen contra Paganos (Cod. Par. Lat. 8084)". Historia. 19 (4): 464–479.
- Matthews, V. J. (1996). Antimachus of Colophon: Text and Commentary. Brill.
- McGinn, Thomas A. J. (1998). Prostitution, Sexuality and the Law in Ancient Rome. Oxford University Press.
- Mignone, Lisa Marie (2016). The Republican Aventine and Rome's Social Order. University of Michigan Press.
- Miller, John F. (1980). "Ritual Directions in Ovid's Fasti: Dramatic Hymns and Didactic Poetry". Classical Journal. 75 (3): 204–214.
- Nagle, Betty Rose (1995). Ovid's Fasti: Roman Holidays. Indiana University Press.
- Orlin, Eric M. (2002). Temples, Religion, and Politics in the Roman Republic. Brill.
- Palmer, Robert E. A. (1974). "Roman Shrines of Female Chastity from the Caste Struggle to the Papacy of Innocent I". Rivista Storica dell' Antichà. 4: 122–159.
- Pandey (2021). "Engendering Aeneas's Shield: The Union of Venus and Vulcan at Aeneid 8.370–453". Vergilius. 67: 47–68. JSTOR 27078492.
- Parker, Holt N. (2004). "Why Were the Vestals Virgins? Or the Chastity of Women and the Safety of the Roman State". American Journal of Philology. 125 (4): 563–601. doi:10.1353/ajp.2005.0009.
- Pasco-Pranger, Molly (2006). Founding the Year: Ovid's Fasti and the Poetics of the Roman Calendar. Brill.
- Pasco-Pranger, Molly (2019). "With the Veil Removed: Women's Public Nudity in the Early Roman Empire". Classical Antiquity. 38 (2): 217–249. doi:10.1525/ca.2019.38.2.217.
- Porte, Danielle (1978). "Les Fastes d'Ovide et le sourcil latin". Latomus (in French). 37 (4): 851–873.
- Porte, Danielle (1985). L'Etiologie religieuse dans les Fastes d'Ovide (in French). Les Belles Lettres.
- Purcell, Nicholas (1986). "Livia and the Womanhood of Rome". Proceedings of the Cambridge Philological Society. 32 (212): 78–105. doi:10.1017/S0068673500004831. JSTOR 44696918.
- Rasmussen, Susanne William (2003). Public Portents in Republican Rome. L'ERMA di BRETSCHNEIDER.
- Rawson, Elizabeth (1974). "Religion and Politics in the Late Second Century B. C. at Rome". Phoenix. 28 (2): 193–212. doi:10.2307/1087418. JSTOR 1087418.
- Reinach, Salomon (1917). "Vénus à la balance". Revue Archéologique (in French). 5: 289–295. JSTOR 41030673.
- Richardson Jr., Lawrence (1992). A New Topographical Dictionary of Ancient Rome. Johns Hopkins University Press. ISBN 9780801843006.
- Richlin, Amy (2014). Arguments with Silence: Writing the History of Roman Women. University of Michigan Press.
- Ridgway, Brunhilde Sismondo (1981). "Greek Antecedents of Garden Sculpture". In Jashemski, Wilhelmina F. (ed.). Ancient Roman Gardens. Dumbarton Oaks. pp. 7–28.
- Rives, J. B. (2006). "Venus". Brill's New Pauly Online. Brill. doi:10.1163/1574-9347_bnp_e12200430.
- Roberts, Michael (1989). "The Use of Myth in Latin Epithalamia from Statius to Venantius Fortunatus". Transactions of the American Philological Association. 119: 321–348. doi:10.2307/284279. JSTOR 284279.
- Romero, Irene Mañas; López, José Nicolás Saiz (2020). "Pueri nascentes: rituals, birth and social recognition in Ancient Rome". In Rebay-Salisbury, Katharina; Pany-Kucera, Doris (eds.). Ages and Abilities: The Stages of Childhood and their Social Recognition in Prehistoric Europe and Beyond. Childhood in the Past Monograph Series. Archaeopress. pp. 235–248.
- Salzman, Michele Renee (1990). On Roman Time: The Codex-Calendar of 354 and the Rhythms of Urban Life in Late Antiquity. University of California Press.
- Santangelo, Frederic (2013). Divination, Prediction and the End of the Roman Republic. Cambridge University Press.
- Schilling, Robert (1954). La Religion romaine de Vénus depuis les origines jusqu'au temps d'Auguste. Bibliothèque des écoles françaises d’Athènes et de Rome. Vol. 178. E. de Boccard.
- Schultz, Celia E. (2006). Women's Religious Activity in the Roman Republic. University of North Carolina Press.
- Schultz, Celia E.; Ward, Allen M.; Heichelheim, F. M.; Yeo, C. A. (2019). A History of the Roman People (7 ed.). Routledge.
- Scullard, H. H. (1981). Festivals and Ceremonies of the Roman Republic. Cornell University Press.
- Slaney, Helen (2020). Kinaesthesia and Classical Antiquity 1750–1820: Moved by Stone. Bloomsbury.
- Spencer, Diana (2019). Language and Authority in De Lingua Latina: Varro's Guide to Being Roman. University of Wisconsin Press.
- Staples, Ariadne (1998). From Good Goddess to Vestal Virgins: Sex and Category in Roman Religion. Routledge.
- Sutor, Ann (2015). "The Anasyrma: Baubo, Medusa, and the Gendering of Obscenity". In Dutsch, Dorota (ed.). Ancient Obscenities: Their Nature and Use in the Ancient Greek and Roman Worlds. University of Michigan Press. pp. 21–43.
- Strong, Anise K. (2016). Prostitutes and Matrons in the Roman World. Cambridge University Press.
- Van Den Berg, R. M. (2001). Proclus' Hymns: Essays, Translations, Commentary. Philosophia Antiqua: A Series of Studies on Ancient Philosophy. Vol. 90. Brill.
- Versnel, H. S. (1992). "The Festival for Bona Dea and the Thesmophoria". Greece & Rome. 39 (1): 31–55. doi:10.1017/S0017383500023974.
- Vessey, David (1973). Statius and the Thebaid (2010 ed.). Cambridge University Press.
- Wagenvoort, Hendrik (1980). Pietas: Selected Studies in Roman Religion. Brill.
- Wallace-Hadrill, Andrew (1981). "Galba's Aequitas". Numismatic Chronicle. 141: 20–39. JSTOR 42667331.
- Wildfang, Robin Lorsch (2006). Rome's Vestal Virgins: A Study of Rome's Vestal Priestesses in the Late Republic and Early Empire. Routledge.
- Wiseman, T. P. (1979). Clio's Cosmetics: Three Studies in Greco-Roman Literature. Leicester University Press.
- Wiseman, T. P. (2008). Unwritten Rome. University of Exeter Press.
- Zeiner-Carmichael, Noelle K. (2007). "Perfecting the Ideal: Molding Roman Women in Statius's Silvae". Arethusa. 40 (2): 165–181. doi:10.1353/are.2007.0019. JSTOR 44578473.
- Zeitlin, Froma I. (1982). "Cultic Models of the Female: Rites of Dionysus and Demeter". Arethusa. 15 (1/2): 129–157.
