= Murcia (deity) =

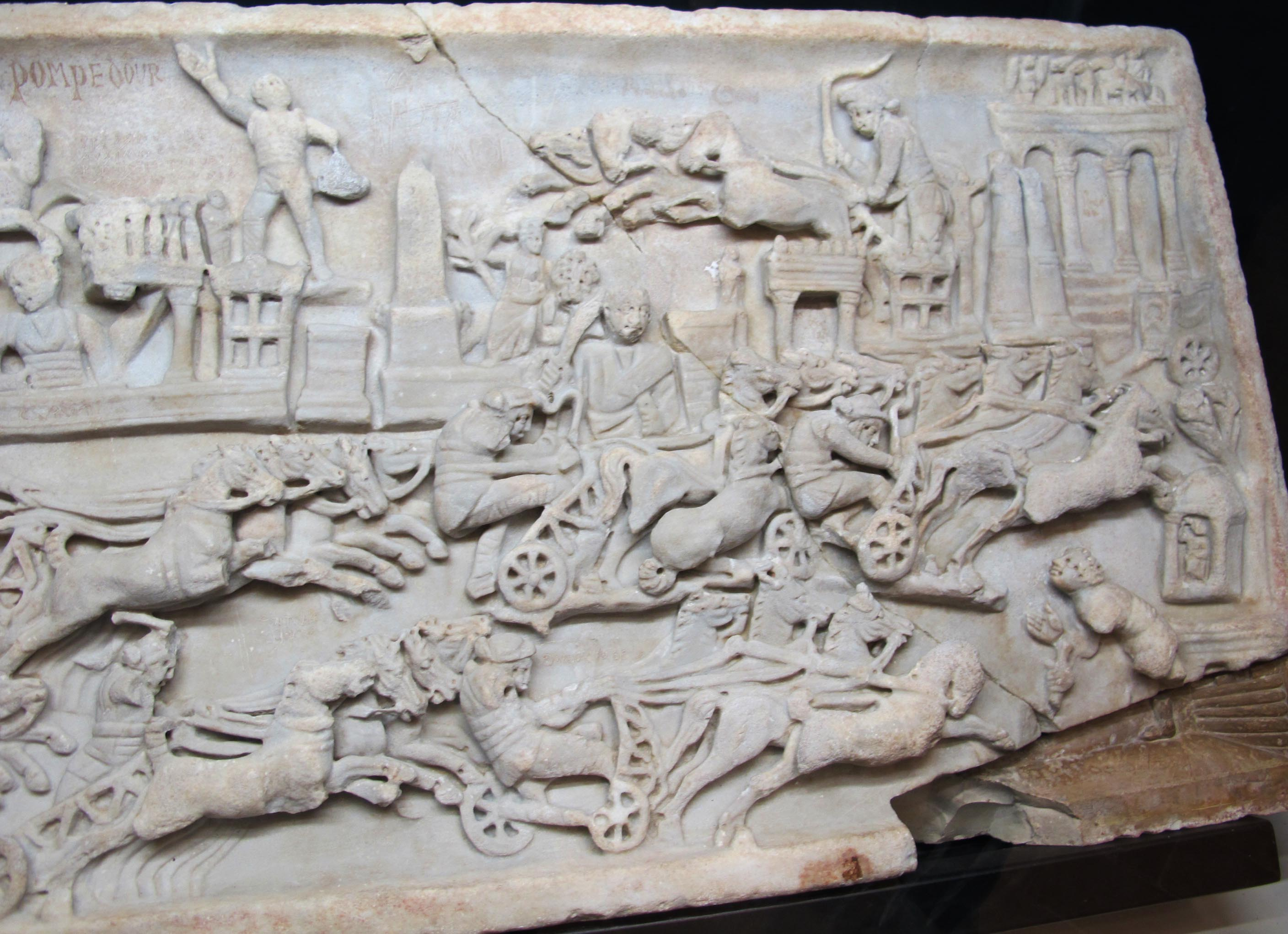
Detail from the Foligno relief of the Circus Maximus, showing the shrine of Murcia with a myrtle tree in the lower right, just above the broken corner

Murcia was a little-known goddess in ancient Rome. Her name occurs as an epithet of Venus.

According to Livy she had a temple at the foot of the Aventine Hill near to the Palatine Hill. Murcus is said to have been an old name for the Aventine Hill itself; hence the adjective murtius (= murcius) was applied to the turning-posts of the Circus Maximus, which was also situated in a valley between the Aventine and the Palatine Hills.

The name Murcia was linked to the name of the myrtle tree (Latin myrtus) by folk etymology; hence the spellings Murtia and Murtea. This association with myrtle, which was a sign of Venus, led to her naming as "Venus of the Myrtles". Christian writers, in their turn, connected Murcia with the adjective murcus or murcidus "lazy, inactive", thus interpreting her as a "goddess of sloth and laziness".

== See also ==
- Vallis Murcia
- Venus Verticordia and Murcia

== Sources ==
- Humphrey, John H. (1986). Roman Circuses: Arenas for Chariot Racing. University of California Press.
