= Robert Schilling (historian) =

French historian and Latinist (1913-2004)

- Born: Jean Léon Robert Schilling; 17 April 1913; Guebwiller
- Died: 30 October 2004 (aged 91); Strasbourg
- Occupations: Historian; Latinist

Robert Schilling (17 April 1913 – 30 October 2004) was a 20th-century French historian and Latinist, a specialist in the history of religion in ancient Rome.

== Biography ==
A former student of the École Normale Supérieure where he was admitted in 1935, received at the agrégation de lettres in 1938, Robert Schilling was appointed a member of the École française de Rome in 1939. Mobilized until 1941, however, he was unable to make the intended stay. Official representative of the National Museums in 1941, appointed professor in the high school of Moulins (Allier) in 1942, he soon after became assistant and lecturer of Latin at the Sorbonne where he was elected maître de conférence in 1945, and some time later professor of Latin language and civilization at the University of Strasbourg. He held this position until 1982, the year of his retirement. Since 1957, he also was director of studies at the École pratique des hautes études, Vth section, for a teaching about religions of Rome. In the last part of his life, he held the title of emeritus professor of the university of Strasbourg.

In 1988, he was elected a corresponding member of the Académie des Inscriptions et Belles-Lettres. He was also a correspondent of the Pontifical Academy of Archaeology.

He was doctor honoris causa of the University of Freiburg, chevalier of the Légion d'honneur, officier of the Ordre des Palmes académiques, holder of the croix de guerre 1939-1945, commandeur of the ordre national du Lion du Sénégal and in 1982, one of the laureates of the Prix Broquette-Gonin awarded by the Académie française for his work La Religion romaine de Vénus.

== Principal publications ==
- 1948: L'Alsace, Éditions Fernand Nathan
- 1954: La religion romaine de Vénus depuis les origines jusqu'au temps d'Auguste (Review), De Boccard, rep. 2003 (thesis).
- 1979: Rites, cultes, dieux de Rome (Review), Paris, Éditions Klincksieck, 450 pages. ISBN 9782252019764
- 1988: Dans le sillage de Rome : Religion, poésie, humanisme, Klincksieck

== Translations ==
- 1944: La veillée de Vénus Pervigilium Veneris, Les Belles Lettres, reprint 2003, 80 pages
- 1992: Ovid, Les Fastes, Tome I, livres I à III; Paris, Les Belles Lettres

== Bibliography ==
- Gustave Hentz, "Jean Léon Robert Schilling", in Nouveau Dictionnaire de biographie alsacienne, vol. 47, p. 4920
- H. Zehnacker, G. Hentz (éd.), Hommages à Robert Schilling, Paris, 1983.
- H. Zehnacker, In memoriam Robert Schilling (1913–2004), in Revue des Études Latines, tome 82, 2004 (2005), (pp. 15–16).
- J.-J. Maffre, Nécrologie dans Bulletin de la Société Nationale des Antiquaires de France, 2004–2005, (pp. 239–240).
