= Mazarin Venus =

Roman sculpture of Venus

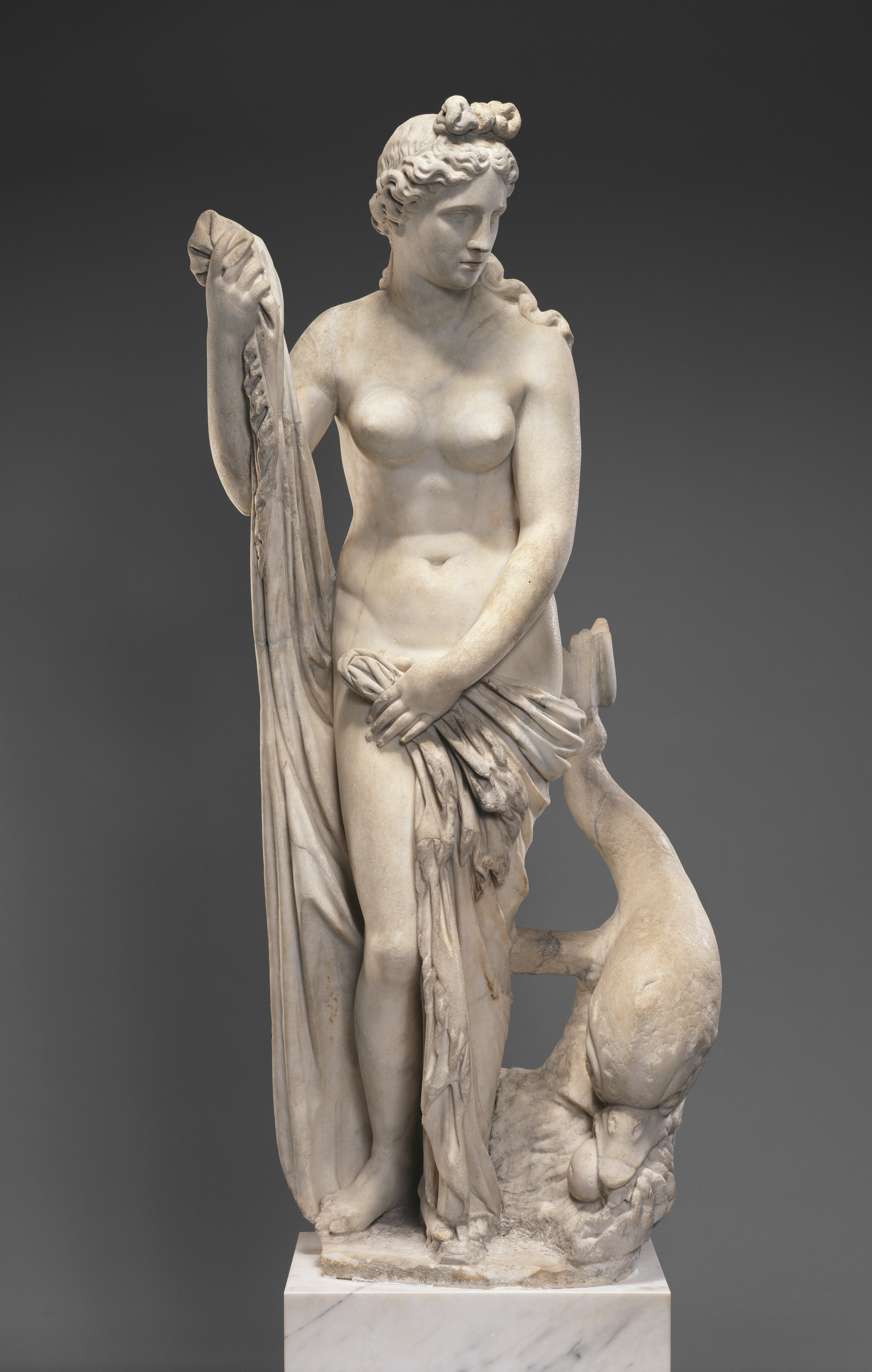
- Year: 2nd century AD
- Catalogue: 54.AA.11
- Medium: Marble
- Location: Getty Villa

The Mazarin Venus is a Roman marble sculpture dating to the 2nd century AD. It was discovered in Rome, Italy about 1510 and is currently on view at the Getty Villa. Its name comes from the belief that the sculpture was owned by Cardinal Jules Mazarin, but this is now considered unlikely.

== Influence ==
The Mazarin Venus is a Roman reproduction of Greek sculptures inspired by a sculpture of Venus in the nude made by Praxiteles around 350 BC.

The Mazarin Venus influenced Raphael in several of his designs, including a fresco at the Villa Farnesina in Rome.
