= Celia Schultz =

American classical philologist and latinist

Celia Schultz is Professor of Classical Studies and History in the College of Literature, Science and the Arts at University of Michigan. She specialises in Latin literature, Roman history, and Roman religion.

== Education ==
Schultz received her PhD from Bryn Mawr College in 1999. Her thesis was entitled Women in Roman Republican Religion.

== Career and research ==
Schultz taught at Yale University and Johns Hopkins University before her employment at the University of Michigan in 2010. She was awarded a Rome Prize Fellowship at the American Academy in Rome 2004–5, and she received a Loeb Classical Library Fellowship in 2016. In 2020–21, she was a Fellow at the Swedish Collegium for Advanced Study in Uppsala, Sweden and she was the William Evans Fellow at the University of Otago (2021).

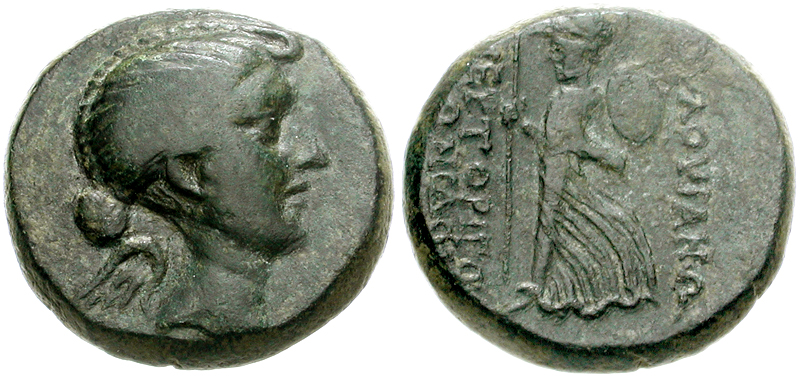
Coin (ca. 41-40 BCE) featuring a bust of Fulvia on the obverse, with a standing Athena on the reverse

Schultz's publications have centred on Roman Republican religion, sacrifice, and women. She published a commentary on Cicero's De Divinatione I (2014) and the monograph Women's Religious Activity in the Roman Republic (2006). She co-edited Religion in Republican Italy for Yale University Press in 2006, and The Religious Life of Things in 2016.

In 2021, she published a biography of Fulvia, the second wife of Mark Antony, with Oxford University Press: Fulvia. Playing for Power at the End of the Roman Republic.
