= Vallis Murcia =

Valley in the city of Rome Between the Palatine and Aventine hills

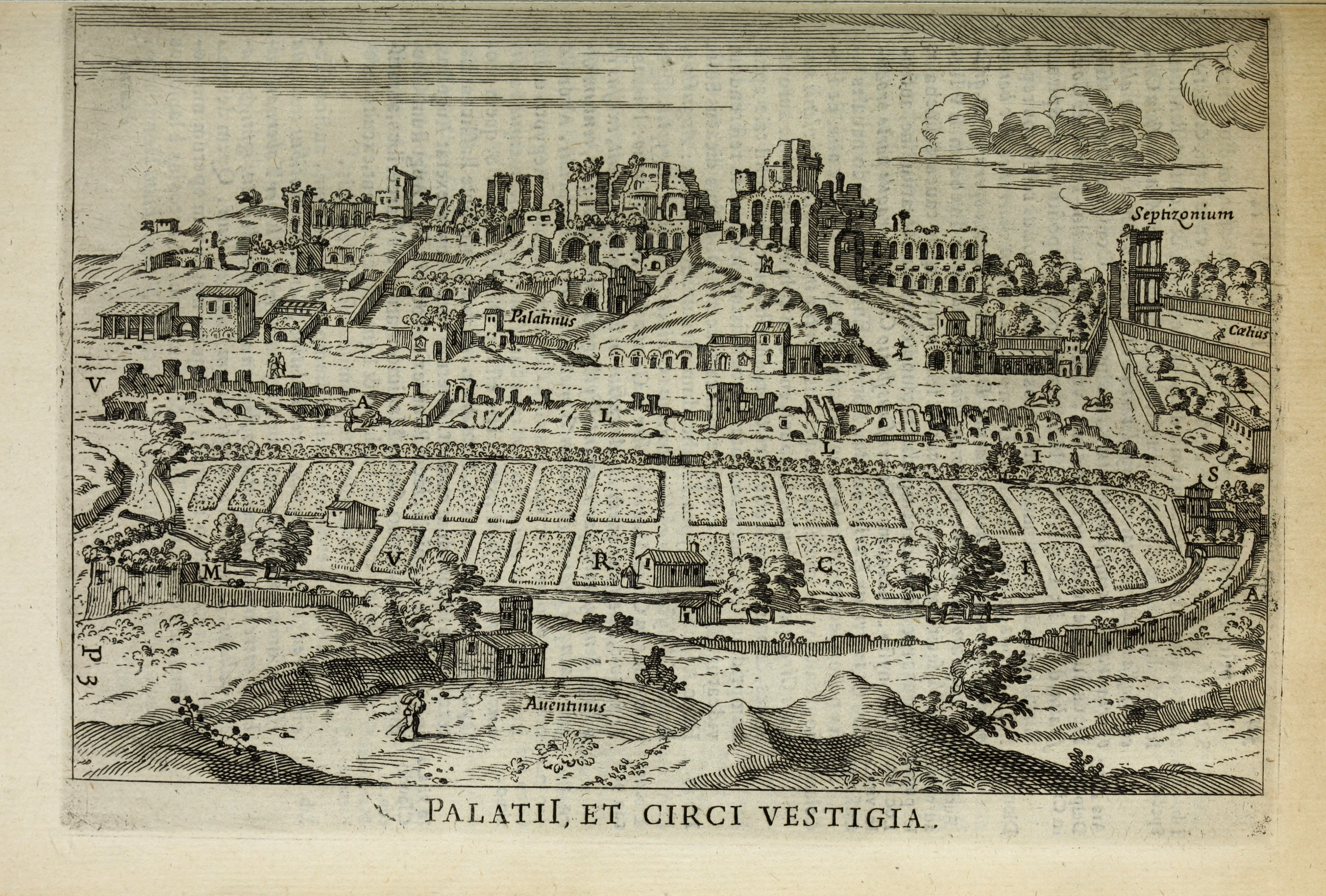
The Vallis Murcia lay between the Palatine (upper third) and Aventine hills, where the traces of the Circus Maximus are shown in this drawing from Roma Vetus ac Recens (1725) by the antiquarian Alessandro Donati

The Vallis Murcia was the Latin name of a valley in the city of Rome between the Palatine and the Aventine Hill, where the Circus Maximus was sited. It was historically significant as a communication route and a neutral place of assembly for events, ceremonies, and performances involving harvest, trade, and military exercises. The valley was particularly associated with activities of the plebs and also those bridging the patrician and plebeian divide.

== Topography ==
The Vallis Murcia was a marshy area extending about 700 meters from northwest to southeast and about 100 meters at its widest point, and was known for flooding periodically until the late 19th century. It was formed from a stream that issued from the east and headed toward the Tiber River. Diane Favro has described the topography:

Carved out by this stream descending from the eastern plateaus, the valley is defined by the sharp slopes of the Palatine Hill on the north and those of the Aventine Hill on the south. To the southeast, the valley opens to a relatively flat plain traverse by the Via Appia; to the northwest it broadens into the riverside plain occupied by the Forum Boarium.

== Name and religious associations ==
The name Vallis Murcia is found only in late antiquity, and earlier the place was simply designated ad Murciae, "at [the altar] of Murcia". The relation of the Vallis Murcia to the cult of the goddess Murcia is somewhat unclear; because the name of the valley appears as such only in later sources, it may be that it derived from the shrine of Murcia. Murcia was identified with Venus Myrtea, Venus of the Myrtle Grove, which Varro suggested had once grown where her altar was. The valley was the site of festivals and rites for several agricultural deities, including a festival of Ceres on April 19 in which torches were tied to the tails of foxes.

== Sources ==
- DiLuzio, Meghan J. (2016). A Place at the Altar: Priestesses in Republican Rome. Princeton University Press.
- Favro, Diane (1999). "The City Is a Living Thing: The Performative Role of an Urban Site in Ancient Rome, the Vallis Murcia". Studies in the History of Art. 56: 204–219.
- Humphrey, John H. (1986). Roman Circuses: Arenas for Chariot Racing. University of California Press.
- Richardson Jr., Lawrence (1992). A New Topographical Dictionary of Ancient Rome. Johns Hopkins University Press.
- Spaeth, Barbette Stanley (2010). The Roman Goddess Ceres. University of California Press.
- Wiseman, T. P. (1995). Remus: A Roman Myth. Cambridge University Press.
