= Shrine of Venus Cloacina =

Shrine of Venus of the Sewer

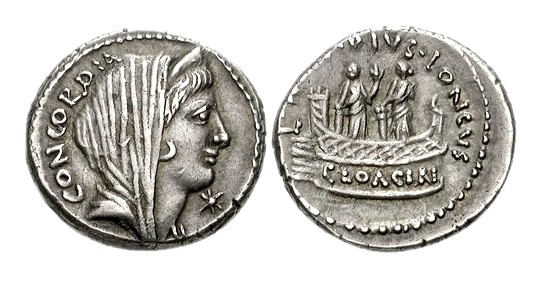
- Denarius of L. Mussidius Longus (42 BC) showing two elevated statues within the balustrade of the shrine of Venus Cloacina

- Shown in ancient Rome
- Interactive map of Shrine of Venus Cloacina
- 41°53′35″N 12°29′10″E

The Shrine of Venus Cloacina (Sacellum Cloacinae or Sacrum Cloacina) was a small sanctuary on the Roman Forum, honoring the divinity of the Cloaca Maxima, the "Great Drain" or sewer of Rome. Cloacina, the goddess associated with the entrance to the sewer system, was later identified with the Roman goddess Venus for unknown reasons, according to Pliny the Elder.

== History ==
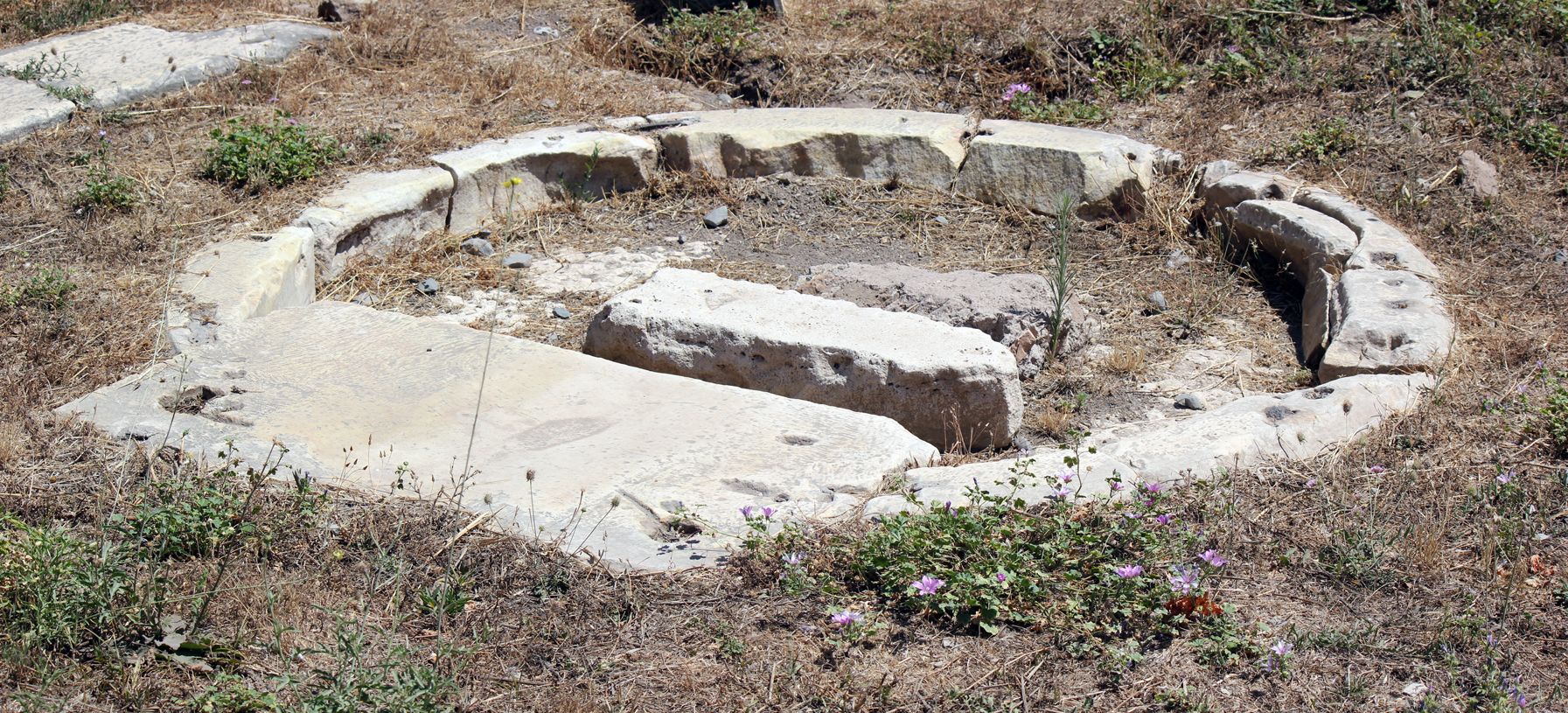
The Sacrum Cloacina as it appeared in August 2012. The top of the shrine is seen at ground level. Its base is several meters below the surface.

The foundation and cult of the shrine was associated in Roman legend with the Sabine king Titus Tatius, who ruled during the time of Romulus (8th century BC). The deity Cloacina may have been associated originally with the small brook which marked the boundary between the Sabines on the Quirinal Hill and Romans on the Palatine Hill and later became the city's Cloaca Maxima.

Two important episodes from Rome's founding are said to have taken place at this shrine, including the purification of the Sabine and Roman armies after a war and the death of Verginia. According to legend, the father of the virtuous Verginia, using a butcher's knife from one of the stalls of the Tabernae Novae ("new shops"), killed his daughter rather than let her fall victim to the lecherous attentions of Appius Claudius in 449 BC.

The Shrine of Venus Cloacina is first mentioned by the playwright Plautus in the early second century BC. It was located in the Forum in front of the Tabernae Novae and on the Via Sacra. The Tabernae Novae were replaced by the expanded Basilica Aemilia in the middle Republic (179 BC), but the shrine was preserved. The round masonry Shrine probably dates from this construction.

== Description ==
Coins minted during the Second Triumvirate (ca. 42 BC) by a moneyer named Lucius Mussidius Longus give a fairly clear visual representation of the shrine. They show a round sacellum (small, uncovered shrine) with a metal balustrade. The scant archaeological remains uncovered between 1899 and 1901 (round travertine substructure, marble rim, diameter 2.40 meters) conform nicely to the pictures on the coins. In his Natural History (77-79 AD), Pliny the Elder refers to signa Cloacinae, which were evidently the two statues shown on the coins and perhaps some other, unidentified objects. One of the statues is holding or waving an object (possibly a flower). Each statue has a low pillar with a bird on it (flowers and birds were well known attributes of Venus). The two statues may have represented the two aspects of the divinity, Cloacina and Venus.

== Religious significance ==
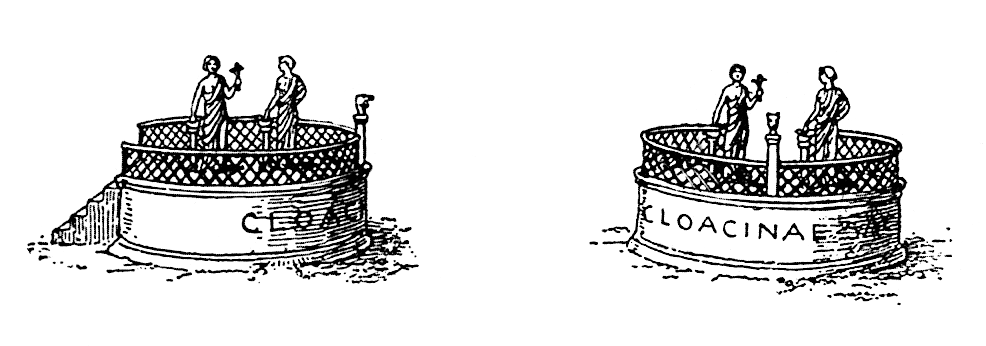
Reconstruction of the Shrine of Venus Cloacina, shown in two views in a 1906 drawing

The Romans believed that a good sewage system was important for the future success of Rome, as a good sewer system was necessary for physical health. Romans cultivated Cloacina as the goddess of purity and the goddess of filth. Cloacina's name is probably derived from the Latin verb cloare (“to purify” or “to clean”), or from cloaca (“sewer)”.

== See also ==
- List of Ancient Roman temples
