= Cloacina =

Roman Goddess of the Cloaca Maxima

- Goddess of the Cloaca Maxima
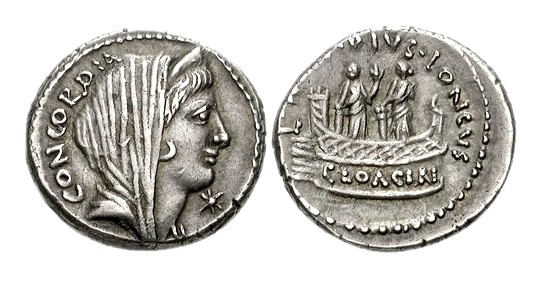
- Denarius of L. Mussidius Longus (42 BC) showing Concordia on the obverse, and two statues within the balustrade of the shrine of Venus Cloacina on the reverse
- Other names: Venus Cloacina
- Major cult center: Rome
- Symbol: Cloaca Maxima
- Gender: Female
- Temple: Shrine of Venus Cloacina

In Roman mythology and culture, Cloacina, also spelled Cluacina, was a goddess who presided over the ancient Cloaca Maxima ('Greatest Drainage'): Rome's main sewer and drainage system.

Cloacina was associated with Venus, the Roman goddess of love and sexuality. Venus was bestowed with the epithet Venus Cloacina ('Venus the Purifier'), an entity that embodied the purifying aspect of her functions. A shrine to Venus Cloacina stood in the Roman Forum, along the Via Sacra.

== Name ==
The theonym Cloācīna is a derivative of the noun cloāca ('sewer, underground drainage'; cf. cluere 'to purify'), itself from Proto-Italic *klowā-, ultimately from Proto-Indo-European *ḱleuH-o- ('clean'). As Venus Cloacina— an epithet or cultic title of Venus— Cloācīna may be interpreted as meaning 'The Purifier'.

== Cloaca Maxima ==
The construction of the Cloaca Maxima was claimed to have been initiated in 600 BCE by Tarquinius Priscus, the legendary fifth king of Rome. As Tarquinius was believed to be from Etruria, Cloacina may have originally been an Etruscan deity. The structure was originally created to drain the surrounding marshes and canalize a stream— a tributary of the Tiber known as the Spinon— that flowed through the areas that would become the Roman Forum, Velabrum, and Forum Boarium.

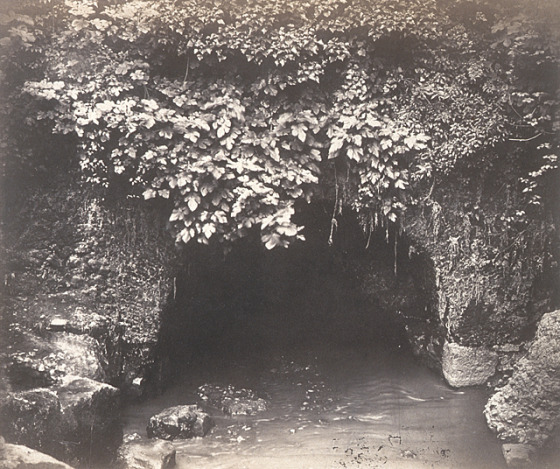
The mouth of the Cloaca Maxima, pictured in 1859

Over the next 700 years, the canal was expanded significantly, with the completed system conveying water from the Forum Augustus to the Tiber. It was also connected to the city's eleven aqueducts, and covered with a roof. The system was used to move fresh water through the city, clear trash and debris from the streets, and drain dirty flood waters; resultantly, the Cloaca Maxima's importance to the city's hygiene was well-recognized by the Romans. Unlike modern sewers, the system very likely did not receive human waste from private or public latrines

== Functions ==
Worship of Cloacina is attested to as early as Plautus (254-184 BCE) in his play Curculio, which was likely written around 197-194 BCE. The ancient Romans believed that moving water— which Varro and Servius called 'living water'— was sacred. As the Cloaca Maxima was originally a stream, the drainage system itself may have also been considered sacred. This may explain why the Romans preserved the original winding path of the stream, even though the twists and turns in the system made the Cloaca Maxima less effective than the city's other, straighter drainage systems.

Therefore, as a goddess, Cloacina may have presided over the system and embodied its sacred and purifying properties. However, other scholars have claimed that Cloacina was not affiliated with the Cloaca Maxima as a source of purification; the system itself was not clean, and it instead ultimately polluted the city's drinking water. Alternately, she may have presided specifically over the ancient Velabrum and the stream that ran through it, the Spinon, and embodied the purifying properties of its waters.

=== As Venus Cloacina ===
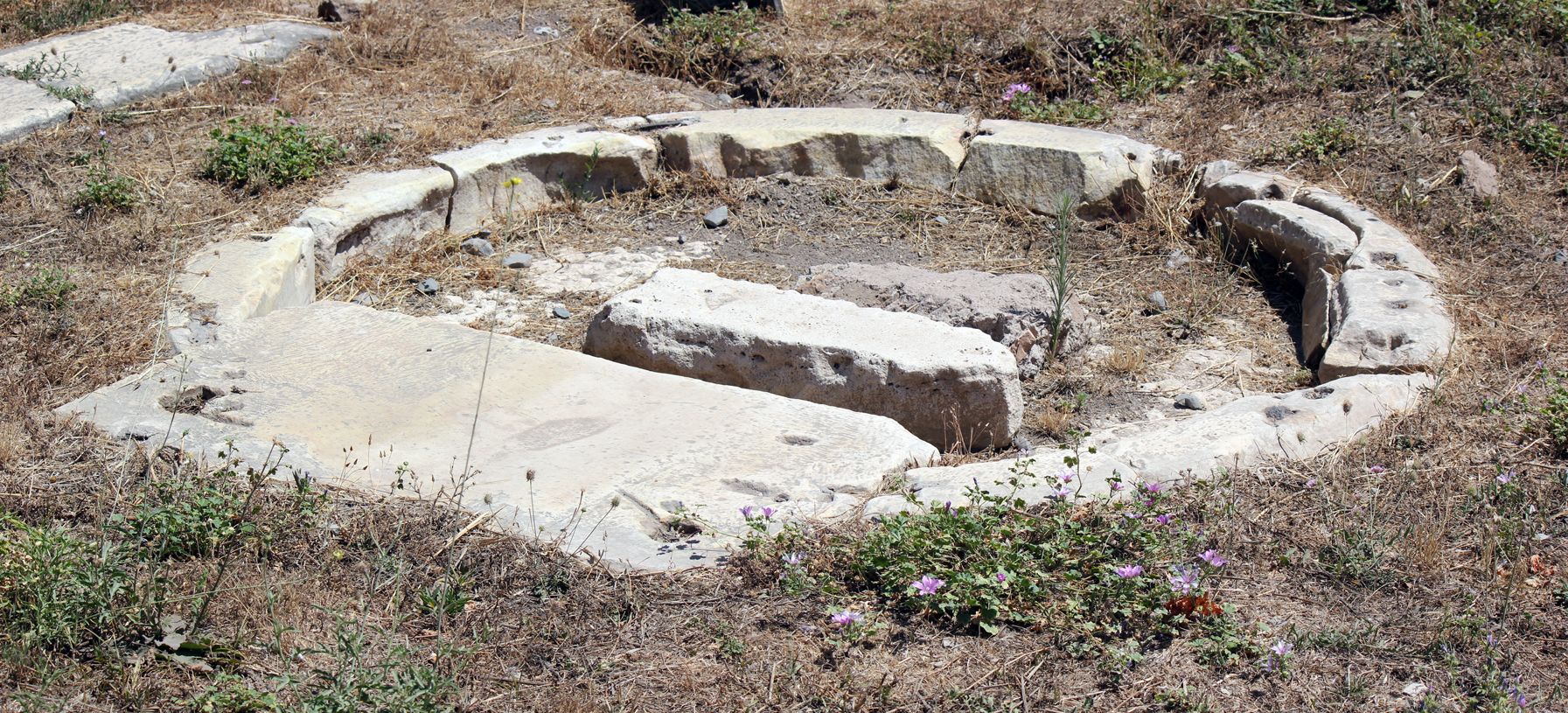
Remains of the Shrine of Venus Cloacina as they appeared in 2012. The top of the shrine is at ground level, while the base is several meters below the surface

It is unknown when Venus and Cloacina were first associated and assimilated into Venus Cloacina. According to Roman foundation myth, after a war broke out between the Romans and the Sabines following the rape of the Sabine women, the Sabine king Titus Tacitus and the Roman king Romulus put aside their weapons at the site of the shrine of Venus Cloacina, and brokered peace. The Sabines and Romans were therefore united as one people, and the ceremony was marked by a cleansing ritual using branches of myrtle: a symbol of the goddess Venus. As the war originally broke out over the issue of marriage, and Tacitus was believed to be the founder of marriage between the Sabines and Romans, Venus Cloacina may have accordingly been viewed as a goddess who purified sexual intercourse within marriage.

Additionally, the goddess' shrine is named by Livy as the location where Verginius killed his daughter Verginia to keep her from being falsely forced into sexual slavery by the decemvir Appius Claudius. When he kills his daughter, Verginius states: "In this the only way in which I can, I vindicate, my child, thy freedom." Verginia's death ensured she remained undefiled, and its location being the shrine of Venus Cloacina supports the idea that the goddess was seen as a purifying force.

Venus was similarly associated with water. Multiple rites and festivals dedicated to the goddess involved cleansing oneself; one example is the Veneralia, where female attendants bathed both the cult statue of Venus and themselves, decorated with garlands of myrtle. Venus and her Greek counterpart Aphrodite were also associated with baths: statues of the goddess appeared in bathing facilities at Bostra and Akko. Therefore, some scholars believe that Venus Cloacina was a goddess of fertility and purification whose powers were directly tied to the use of sacred moving water.

== Worship ==
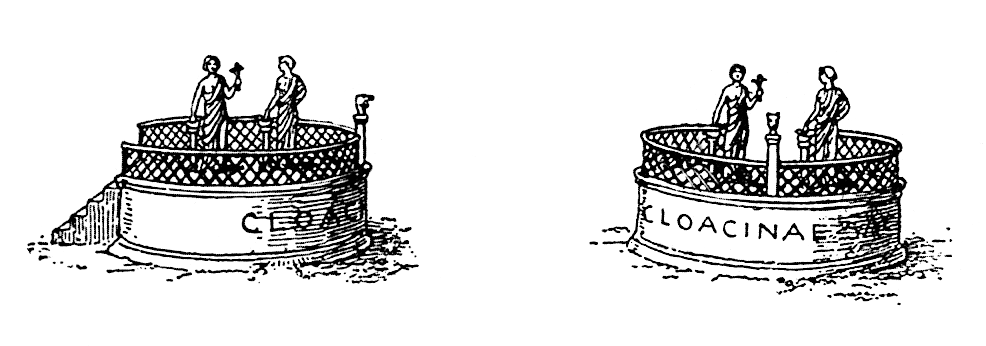
Two illustrations of the Shrine of Venus Cloacina from Christian Hülsen's Das Forum Romanum (1904)

A small, circular shrine of Venus Cloacina was situated before the Basilica Aemilia on the Roman Forum and sat directly above the Cloaca Maxima. The remaining structure consists of a marble base situated on a slab of travertine, round except for a rectangular projection on its west edge: the remains of stairs. The structure very likely dates to Sulla's reign, around 80 BCE.

=== Imagery ===
Some Roman coins depict images of the shrine. One denarius struck in 39 BCE shows the temple with a balustrade and two female figures, identified by Pliny as statues of Venus. Other versions of the image are similar, but depict one of the figures holding a flower. These two women may have represented both aspects of the goddess: Venus and Cloacina. One coin from 42 BCE displays the head of the goddess Concordia on the obverse and the shrine of Venus Cloacina with two female figures on the reverse. This coin may have commemorated an agreement or reconciliation between parties, likely referencing the reconciliation between the Sabines and Romans following the rape of the Sabine women.

== In literature ==
In later English works, particularly during the 18th and 19th centuries, Cloacina was utilized as a satirical figure, and the "temple of Cloacina" was used as a euphemism for the toilet. This understanding of Cloacina may be attributed to Augustine of Hippo's ridicule of Cloacina as an unrespectable goddess of sewers. In The Dunciad, Alexander Pope describes Cloacina as a filthy and foul-smelling figure that enjoys crude jokes, and whose favorites are smeared with poop. Additionally, when discussing Pope's Sober Advice from Horace, Philip Stanhope recommends that his son should tear a page from the text every time he needs to use the bathroom, as a "sacrifice to Cloacina."

Cloacina was associated with vulgarity and obscenity. In 1782, after the debut of Francis Hopkinson's oratorio, The Temple of Minerva, an obscene, anonymously-penned parody titled "The Temple of Cloacina: An Oral-whig-ial Entertainment" appeared in the James Rivington's newspaper, the Royal Gazette. The parody was scandalous, described as "more witty than Rabillais [sic]; more nasty than Swift; more vulgar than Tom Brown," and "all over filth and nastiness."

== See also ==
- Venus
- Mefitis
- Rape of the Sabine Women
- Verginia

== Bibliography ==
- de Vaan, Michiel (2008). Etymological Dictionary of Latin and the other Italic Languages. Brill. ISBN 9789004167971.
