= Cloaca Maxima =

Main sewage system of Ancient Rome

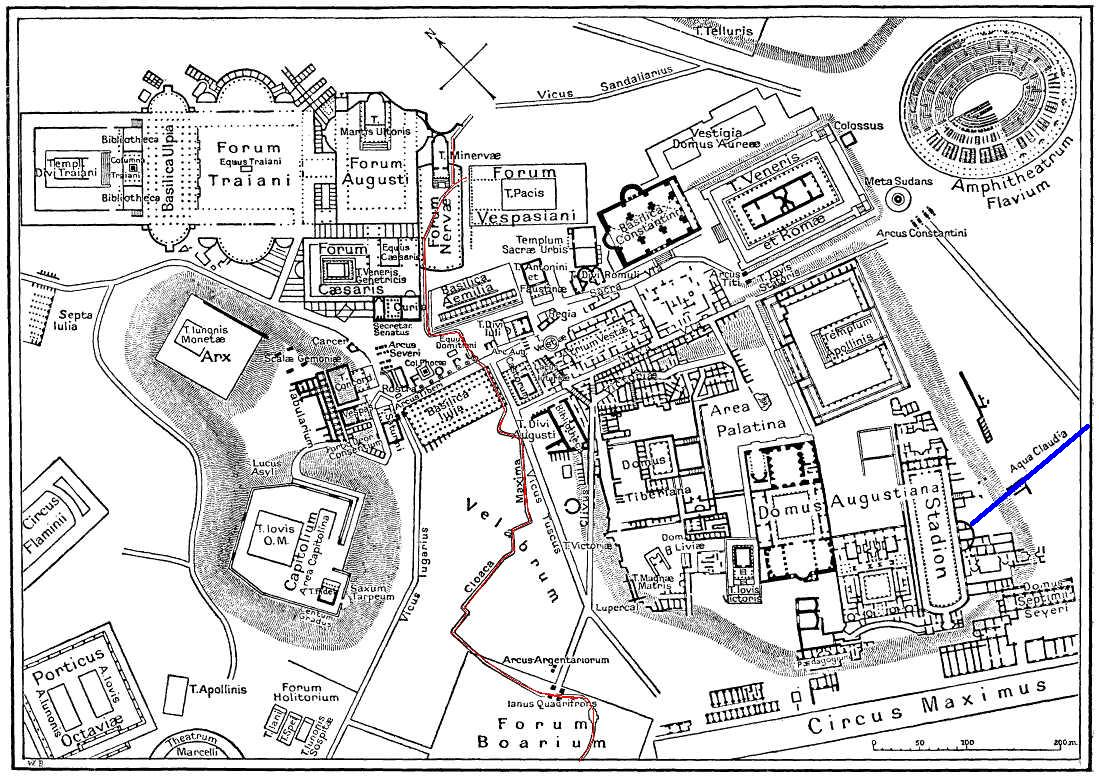
- A map of central Rome during the time of the Roman Empire, showing the Cloaca Maxima in red

- Shown within Augustan Rome
- Interactive map of Cloaca Maxima
- 41°53′20″N 12°28′49″E

The Cloaca Maxima (Latin: Cloāca Maxima [kɫɔˈaːka ˈmaksɪma], lit. 'Greatest Sewer') or, less often, Maxima Cloaca, is one of the world's earliest sewage systems. Its name is related to that of Cloacina, a Roman goddess. Built during either the Roman Kingdom or early Roman Republic, it was constructed in Ancient Rome in order to drain local marshes and remove waste from the city. It carried effluent to the River Tiber, which ran beside the city. The sewer started at the Forum Augustum and ended at the Ponte Rotto and Ponte Palatino. It began as an open air canal, but it developed into a much larger sewer over the course of time. Agrippa renovated and reconstructed much of the sewer. This would not be the only development in the sewers, by the first century AD all eleven Roman aqueducts were connected to the sewer. After the Roman Empire fell the sewer was still used. By the 19th century, it had become a tourist attraction. Some parts of the sewer are still used today. During its heyday, it was highly valued as a sacred symbol of Roman culture and Roman engineering.

== Construction and history ==
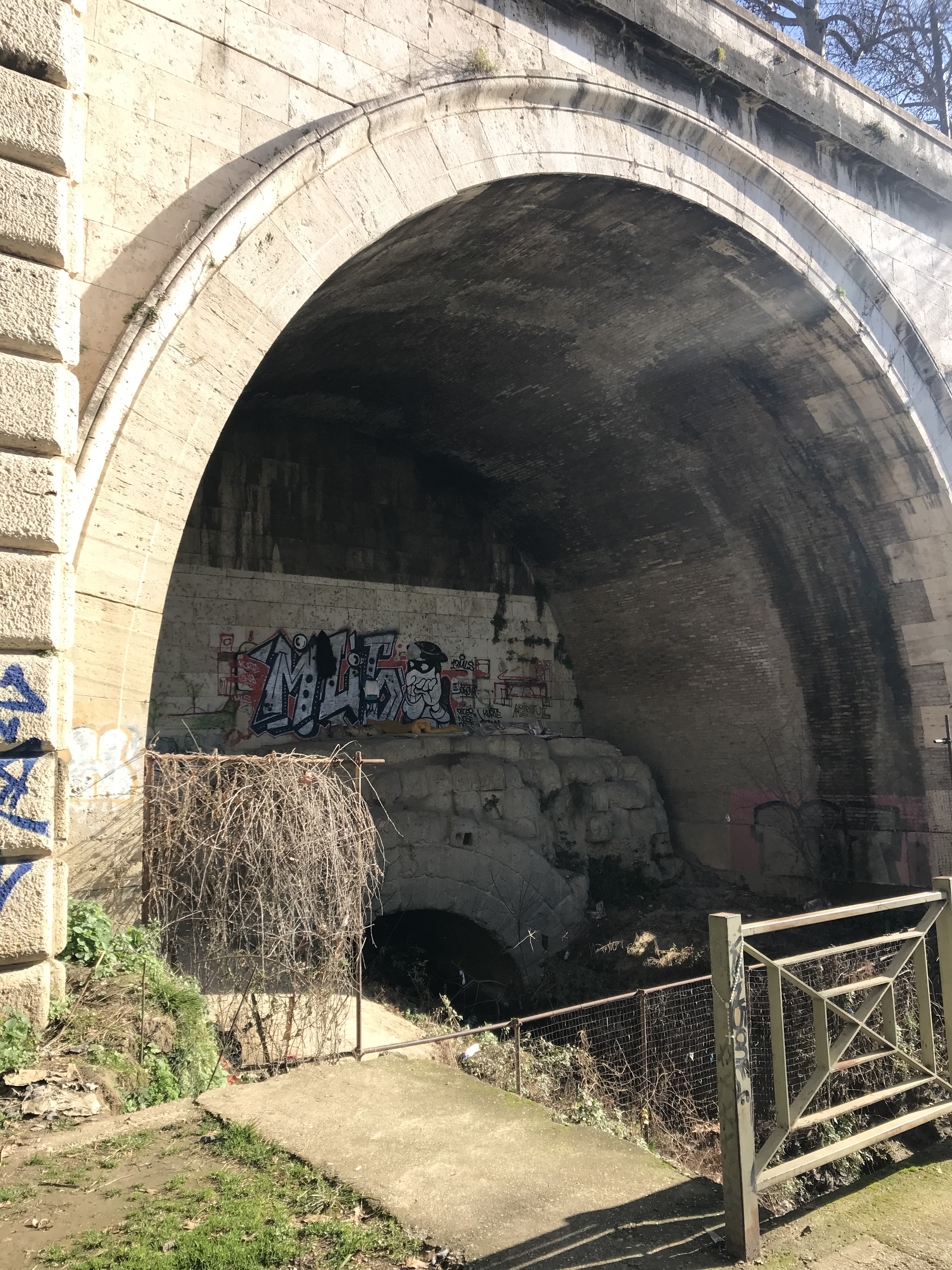
The outfall of the Cloaca Maxima as it appeared in January 2019

A view of the Cloaca Maxima as it appeared in 1814. Oil on canvas by Christoffer Wilhelm Eckersberg.

According to tradition, it may have initially been constructed around 600 BC under the orders of the king of Rome, Tarquinius Priscus. He ordered Etruscan workers and the plebeians to construct the drainage. Before constructing the Cloaca Maxima, Priscus, and his son Tarquinius Superbus, worked to transform the land by the Roman forum from a swamp into a solid building ground, thus reclaiming the Velabrum. In order to achieve this, they filled it up with 10-20,000 cubic meters of soil, gravel, and debris.

At the beginning of the drainage's life it consisted of open-air channels lined up with bricks centered around a main pipe. At this stage it might have had no roof. However, wooden holes spread throughout the sewer indicate that wooden bridges may have been built over it, which possibly functioned as a roof. Alternatively, the holes could have functioned as a support for the scaffolding needed to construct the drainage. The Cloaca Maxima may also have originally been an open drain, formed from streams originating from three of the neighboring hills, that were channeled through the main Forum and then on to the Tiber. As building space within the city became more valuable, the drain was gradually built over.

By the time of the late Roman Republic this drainage became the city's main storm drain. It developed into a system 1,600 meters long. By the second century BC, it had a 101 meter long canal which was covered up and expanded into also function as the main urban sewer system. Pliny the Elder, writing in the late 1st century, describes the early Cloaca Maxima as "large enough to allow the passage of a wagon loaded with hay." Eventually, the drainage could not continue growing to keep up with the expanding city. Romans would discard waste through other openings rather than the sewers. From 31 BC to 192 AD manholes could be used to access the drainage, which could be traversed by canal at this point. Manholes were decorated with marble reliefs, and canals were made of Roman concrete and flint.

The eleven aqueducts which supplied water to Rome by the 1st century AD were finally channeled into this drainage system after having supplied many of the public baths such as the Baths of Diocletian and the Baths of Trajan, as well as the public fountains, imperial palaces and private houses. The continuous supply of running water helped to remove wastes and keep the drainage system clear of obstructions. The best waters were reserved for portable drinking supplies, and the second quality waters would be used by the baths, the outfalls of which connected to the sewer network under the streets of the city. The Cloaca Maxima drainage system was well maintained throughout the life of the Roman Empire and even today drains rainwater and debris from the center of town, below the ancient Forum, Velabrum, and the Forum Boarium. In more recent times, the remaining passages have been connected to the modern-day urban drainage system, mainly to cope with problems of backwash from the river.

After the fall of the Roman empire the Cloaca Maxima continued to be used. In the 1600s Cardinal Chamberlain imposed a tax on residents of Rome in order to pay for the upkeep of the drainage. By the time of the 1800s the Cloaca Maxima became popular as a tourist attraction. From 1842 to 1852 sections of the drainage system were drained. Pietro Narducci, an Italian engineer was hired by the city of Rome to survey and restore the parts of the drainage by the Forum and the Torre dei Conti in 1862. In 1890 Otto Ludwig Richter, a German archaeologist created a map of the drainage. These efforts renewed public interest in sanitation.

== Route ==
The Cloaca Maxima started at the Forum Augustum and followed the natural course of the suburbs of ancient Rome, which led between the Quirinal, Viminal, and Esquilline Hills. It also passed by the Forum of Nerva, the Arch of Janus, the Forum Boarium, the Basilica Aemilia, and the Forum Romanum, ending at the Velabrum. The drainage's outfall was by the Ponte Rotto and Ponte Palatino. Some of this is still visible today. The branches of the main drainage all appear to be 'official' drains that would have served public toilets, bathhouses and other public buildings.

== Significance and effects ==
The extraordinary greatness of the Roman Empire manifests itself above all in three things: the aqueducts, the paved roads, and the construction of the drains.

— Dionysius of Halicarnassus, Ant. Rom. 3.67.5

The Cloaca Maxima was large enough for "wagons loaded with hay to pass" according to Strabo. It could transport one million pounds of water, unwanted goods and waste, which were dumped into the streets, swamps, and rivers near Rome. They were all carried out to the Tiber River by this drain. It used gutters to collect rainwater, rubbish, and spillage, and conduits to dispense up to ten cubic meters of water per second. Vaults were closed with flat panels or rocks were used in the construction. This drainage used a trench wall to hold back sediments.

Some of its water was still polluted, contaminating water many depended on for irrigation, swimming, bathing, and drinking. The drainage reduced the number of mosquitos, thereby limiting the spread of malaria by draining marshy areas. Animals, including rats, could find their way into the drainage.

The Cloaca Maxima was a highly valued feat of engineering. It may have even been sacrosanct. Since the Romans viewed the movement of water to be sacred, the Cloaca Maxima may have had a religious significance. Aside from religious significance, the Cloaca Maxima may have been praised due to its age and its demonstration of engineering prowess. Livy describes the sewer as:

Works for which the new splendor of these days has scarcely been able to produce a match.— Titus Livius, Titus Livius, The History of Rome, Book 1

The writer Pliny the Elder describes the Cloaca Maxima as an engineering marvel due to its ability to withstand floods of filthy waters for centuries. Cassiodorus, a Roman senator and scholar, praised the sewage system in Variae. The Cloaca Maxima was a symbol of Roman civilization, and its superiority to others. Roman authors were not the only people to praise the Cloaca Maxima. British writer Henry James stated that it gave him: "the deepest and grimmest impression of antiquity I have ever received."

Venus, goddess of love, was the protector of the Cloaca Maxima. There was a small sanctuary dedicated to Venus Cloacina (Venus of the Drain) in the Forum Romanum.

The system of drainage and Roman sewers was much imitated throughout the Roman Empire, especially when combined with copious supplies of water from Roman aqueducts. The sewer system in Eboracum—the modern-day English city of York—was especially impressive and part of it still survives.

== See also ==
- Roman aqueduct
- Barrel vault
- List of Roman aqueducts by date
- Sanitation in ancient Rome

Preceded by Aqua Claudia	Landmarks of Rome; Cloaca Maxima	Succeeded by Baths of Agrippa
