= Venus (mythology) =

Ancient Roman goddess of love, sex and fertility

- Goddess of love, beauty, desire, sex, fertility, prosperity, prostitution, and victory
- Member of Dii Consentes
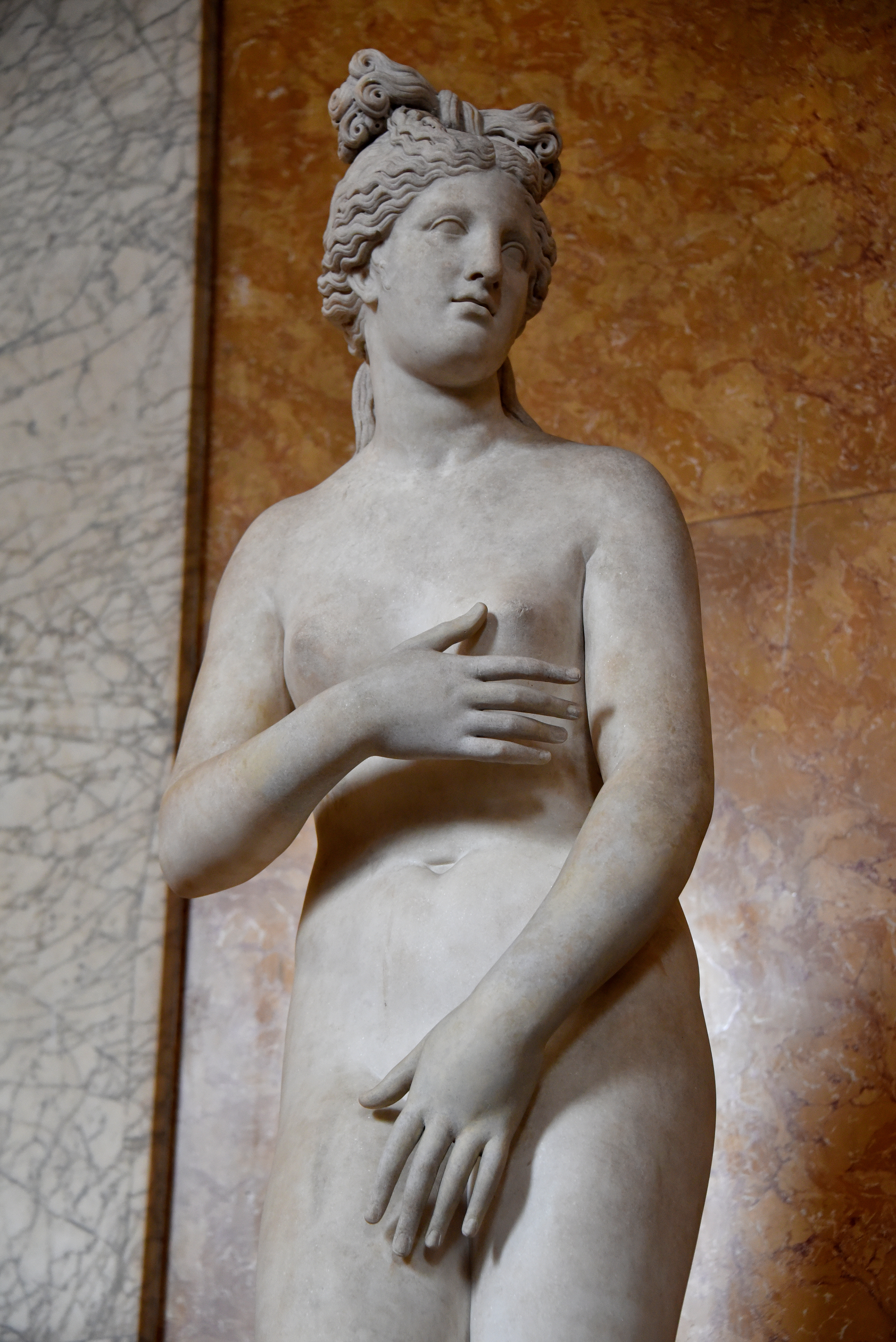
- Statue of Venus of the Capitoline type, Roman, 2nd century AD, found at Campo Iemini in 1794.
- Planet: Venus
- Symbols: Rose, common myrtle
- Day: Friday (dies Veneris)
- Festivals: Veneralia; Vinalia Rustica; Vinalia Urbana

Genealogy
- Parents: Caelus
- Consort: Mars and Vulcan
- Children: Cupid (in later tradition); Aeneas (fathered by Anchises in Virgil's Aeneid)

Equivalents
- Greek: Aphrodite

Venus (/ˈviːnəs/; Classical Latin: [ˈwɛnʊs]) is a Roman goddess whose functions encompass love, beauty, desire, sex, fertility, prosperity, and victory. In Roman mythology, she was the ancestor of the Roman people through her son, Aeneas, who survived the fall of Troy and fled to Italy. Julius Caesar claimed her as his ancestor. Venus was central to many religious festivals, and was revered in Roman religion under numerous cult titles.

The Romans adapted the myths and iconography of her Greek counterpart Aphrodite for Roman art and Latin literature. In the later classical tradition of the West, Venus became one of the most widely referenced deities of Greco-Roman mythology as the embodiment of love and sexuality. As such, she is usually depicted nude.

== Etymology ==
The Latin theonym Venus and the common noun venus 'love, charm' stem from a Proto-Italic form reconstructed as *wenos- 'desire', itself from Proto-Indo-European (PIE) *u̯énh₁-os 'desire' (cf. Messapic Venas, Sanskrit vánas 'desire'). Unlike the Proto-Indo-European form, which would have been a neuter s-stem, the Latin term has acquired the feminine gender, perhaps as a consequence of its relation to a female deity. The cognates of her name generally do not refer to goddesses in other Indo-European cultures, perhaps indicating that the term was innovatively applied to a specifically Italic divinity. Messapic Venas does, however, appear to refer to a divinity, though it is likely that this term was borrowed from an Italic source. Similarly, the name of the goddess is attested in Oscan ϝενζηι (wenzēi), which may also have been borrowed from Latin.

Derivatives include venustus 'attractive, charming', venustās 'charm, grace', venerius 'of Venus, erotic', venerāre 'to adore, revere, honor, venerate, worship', and venerātiō 'adoration'. Venus is also cognate with Latin venia 'favour, permission' and vēnor 'to hunt' through to common PIE root *u̯enh₁- 'to strive for, wish for, desire, love'.

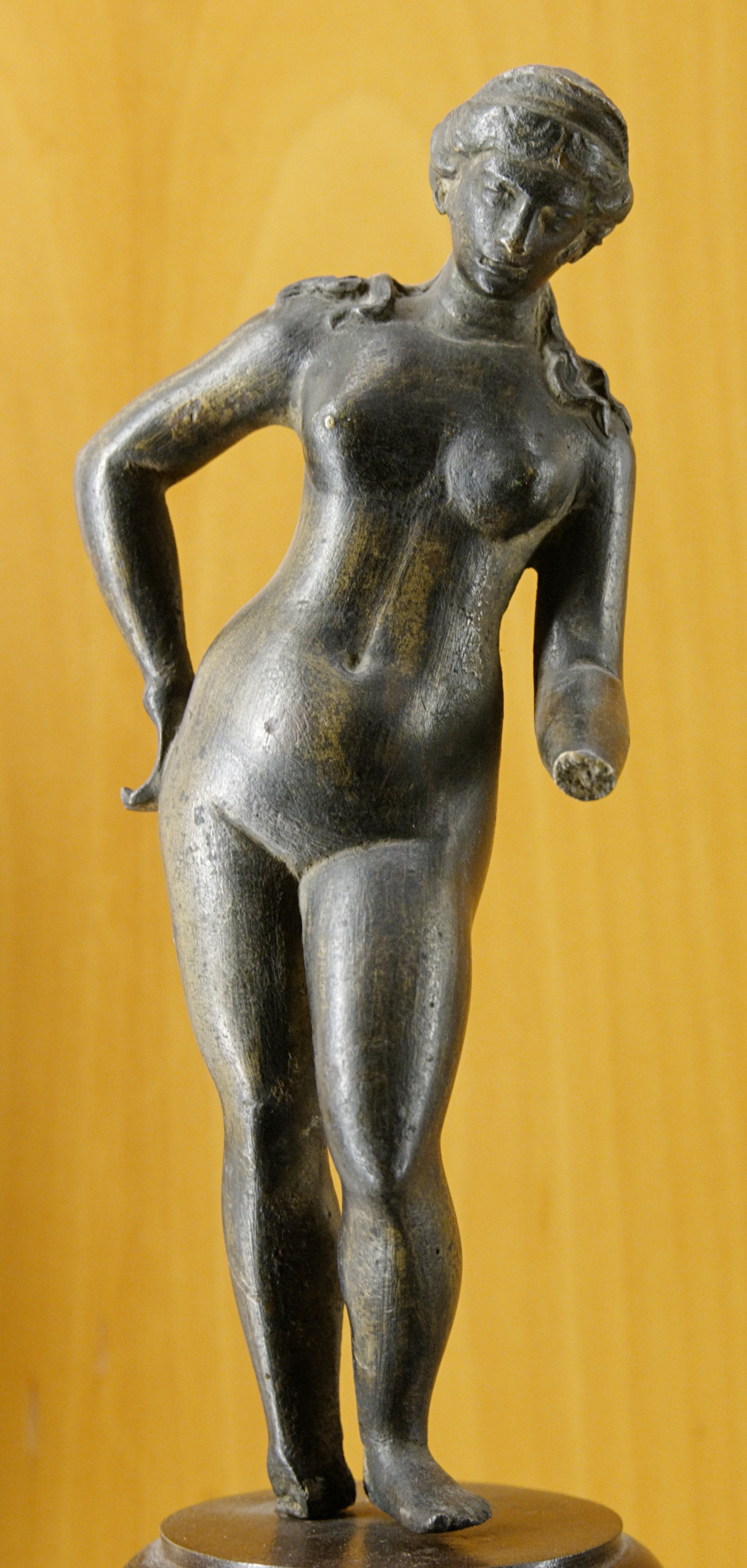
A 2nd- or 3rd-century bronze figurine of Venus, in the collection of the Museum of Fine Arts of Lyon

== Origins ==
Venus has been described as perhaps "the most original creation of the Roman pantheon", and "an ill-defined and assimilative" native goddess, combined "with a strange and exotic Aphrodite". (Note: Eden (1963) discusses possible associations between Astarte or the "Venus of Eryx" and the brassica species E. sativa, which the Romans considered an aphrodisiac.) In the sanctuary of Mefitis at Rossano di Vaglio, the name Venus is mentioned with an accompanying epithet referring to the deity Mefitis. Her cults may represent the religiously legitimate charm and seduction of the divine by mortals, in contrast to the formal, contractual relations between most members of Rome's official pantheon and the state, and the unofficial, illicit manipulation of divine forces through magic. The ambivalence of her persuasive functions has been perceived in the relationship of the root *wenos- with its Latin derivative venēnum 'poison' (from *wenes-no 'love drink' or 'addictive'), in the sense of "a charm, magic philtre".

Venus seems to have had no origin myth until her association with Greek Aphrodite. Venus-Aphrodite emerged, already in adult form, from the sea foam (Greek αφρός, aphrós) produced by the severed genitals of Caelus-Uranus. Roman theology presents Venus as the yielding, watery female principle, essential to the generation and balance of life. Her male counterparts in the Roman pantheon, Vulcan and Mars, are active and fiery. Venus absorbs and tempers the male essence, uniting the opposites of male and female in mutual affection. She is essentially assimilative and benign, and embraces several otherwise quite disparate functions. She can give military victory, sexual success, good fortune and prosperity. In one context, she is a goddess of prostitutes; in another, she turns the hearts of men and women from sexual vice to virtue. Varro's theology identifies Venus with water as an aspect of the female principle. To generate life, the watery matrix of the womb requires the virile warmth of fire. To sustain life, water and fire must be balanced; excess of either one, or their mutual antagonism, is unproductive or destructive.

Prospective brides offered Venus a gift "before the wedding"; the nature of the gift, and its timing, are unknown. The wedding ceremony itself, and the state of lawful marriage, belonged to Juno – whose mythology allows her only a single marriage, and no divorce from her habitually errant spouse, Jupiter – but Venus and Juno are also likely "bookends" for the ceremony; Venus prepares the bride for "conubial bliss" and expectations of fertility within lawful marriage. Some Roman sources say that girls who come of age offer their toys to Venus; it is unclear where the offering is made, and others say this gift is to the Lares. In dice-games played with knucklebones, a popular pastime among Romans of all classes, the luckiest, best possible roll was known as "Venus".

== Epithets ==
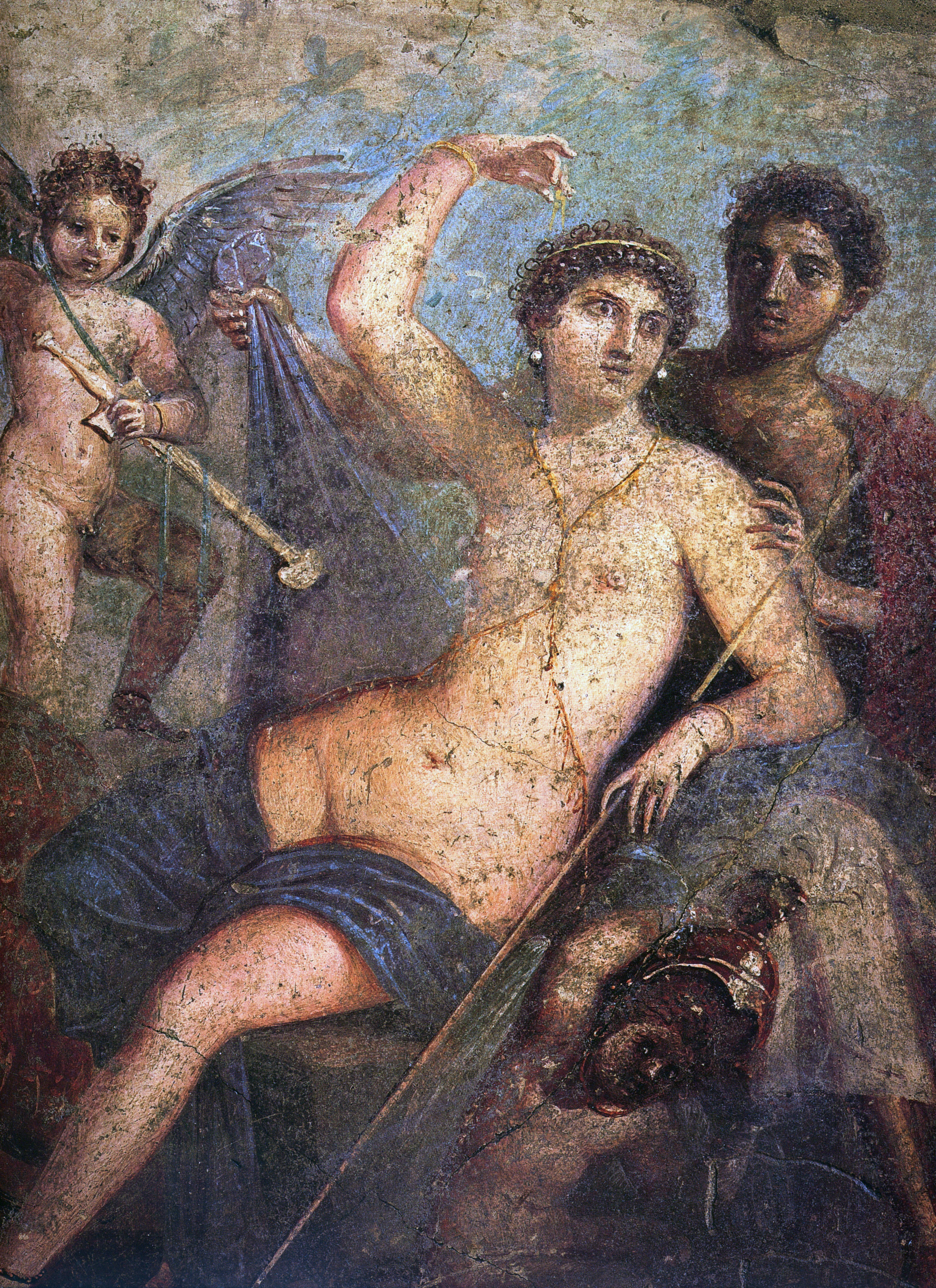
Venus and Mars, with Cupid attending, in a wall painting from Pompeii

Like other major Roman deities, Venus was given a number of epithets that referred to her different cult aspects, roles, and her functional similarities to other deities. Her "original powers seem to have been extended largely by the fondness of the Romans for folk-etymology, and by the prevalence of the religious idea nomen-omen which sanctioned any identifications made in this way." (Note: For further exposition of nomen-omen (or nomen est omen) see)

Venus Acidalia, in Virgil's Aeneid (1.715–22, as mater acidalia). Servius speculates this "rare" and "strangely recondite epithet" as reference to a mooted "Fountain of Acidalia" (fons acidalia) where the Graces (Venus's daughters) were said to bathe; but he also connects it to the Greek word for "dart", "needle", "arrow", whence "love's arrows" and love's bitter "cares and pangs". Ovid uses acidalia only in the latter sense. Venus Acidalia is likely a literary conceit, formed by Virgil from earlier usages in which acidalia had no evident connection to Venus. It was almost certainly not a cultic epithet.

Venus Anadyomene (Venus "rising from the sea"), based on a once-famous painting by the Greek artist Apelles showing the birth of Aphrodite from sea-foam, fully adult and supported by a more-than-lifesized scallop shell. The Italian Renaissance painter Sandro Botticelli used the type in his The Birth of Venus. Other versions of Venus's birth show her standing on land or shoreline, wringing the sea-water from her hair.

Venus Barbata ("Bearded Venus"), mentioned in Servius's commentary on Virgil's Aeneid. Macrobius's Saturnalia describes a statue of Venus in Cyprus, bearded, with male genitalia but in female attire and figure (see also Aphroditus). Her worshippers cross-dressed - men wore women's clothes, and women wore men's. Macrobius says that Aristophanes called this figure Aphroditos. The Latin poet Laevius wrote of worshipping "nurturing Venus" whether female or male (sive femina sive mas). Several examples of Greek and Roman sculpture show her in the attitude anasyrmene, from the Greek verb anasyromai, "to pull up one's clothes" to reveal her male genitalia. The gesture traditionally held apotropaic or magical power.

Venus Caelestis (Celestial or Heavenly Venus), used from the 2nd century AD for Venus as an aspect of a syncretised supreme goddess. Venus Caelestis is the earliest known Roman recipient of a taurobolium (a form of bull sacrifice), performed at her shrine in Pozzuoli on 5 October 134. This form of the goddess, and the taurobolium, are associated with the "Syrian Goddess", understood as a late equivalent to Astarte, or the Roman Magna Mater, the latter being another supposedly Trojan "Mother of the Romans", as well as "Mother of the Gods".

Venus Calva ("Venus the bald one"), a legendary form of Venus, attested only by post-Classical Roman writings which offer several traditions to explain this appearance and epithet. In one, it commemorates the virtuous offer by Roman matrons of their own hair to make bowstrings during a siege of Rome. In another, king Ancus Marcius's wife and other Roman women lost their hair during an epidemic; in hope of its restoration, unafflicted women sacrificed their own hair to Venus. (Note: Ashby (1929) finds the existence of a temple to Venus Calva "very doubtful"; see)

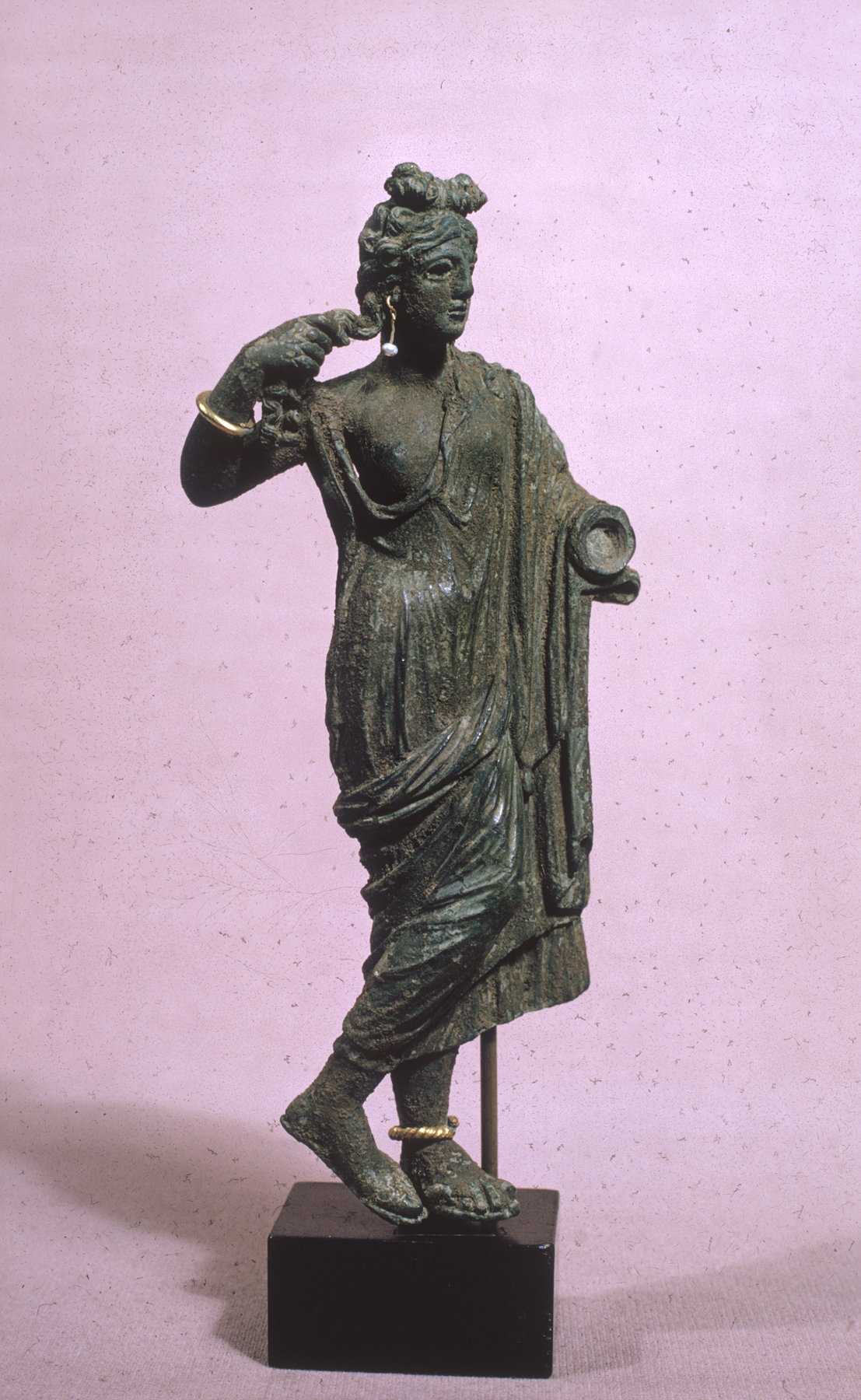
Imperial image of Venus suggesting influence from Syria or Palestine, or from the cult of Isis

Venus Cloacina ("Venus the Purifier"); a fusion of Venus with the Etruscan water goddess Cloacina, who had an ancient shrine above the outfall of the Cloaca Maxima, originally a stream, later covered over to function as Rome's main sewer. The rites conducted at the shrine were probably meant to purify the culvert's polluted waters and noxious airs. (Note: Eden (1963), citing Pliny the Elder, Natural History, 15.119–21.) In some traditions, Titus Tatius was responsible for the introduction of lawful marriage to Rome, and Venus-Cloacina promoted, protected and purified sexual intercourse between married couples.

Venus Erycina ("Erycine Venus"), a Punic statue of Astarte captured from Eryx, in Sicily, and worshiped in Romanised form by the elite and respectable matrons at a temple on the Capitoline Hill. A later temple, outside the Porta Collina and Rome's sacred boundary, may have preserved some Erycine features of her cult. It was considered suitable for "common girls" and prostitutes.

Venus Euploia (Venus of the "fair voyage"), also known as Venus Pontia (Venus of the Sea"), because she smooths the waves for mariners. She is probably based on the influential image of Aphrodite by Praxiteles, once housed in a temple by the sea but now lost. Most copies of its Venus image would have been supported by dolphins, and worn diadems and carved veils, inferring her birth from sea-foam, and a consequent identity as Queen of the Sea, and patroness of sailors and navigation. Roman copies would have embellished baths and gymnasiums.

Venus Frutis honoured by all the Latins with a federal cult at the temple named Frutinal in Lavinium. (Note: "At the midway between Ostia and Antium lies Lavinium that has a sanctuary of Aphrodite common to all Latin nations, but which is under the care of the Ardeans, who have entrusted the task to intendants".) Inscriptions found at Lavinium attest the presence of federal cults, without giving precise details. (Note: "Sp. Turrianus Proculus Gellianus ... pater patratus ... Lavinium sacrorum principiorum p(opuli) R(omani) Quirt(ium) nominisque Latini qui apud Laurentis coluntur".)

Venus Felix ("Lucky Venus"), probably a traditional epithet, combining aspects of Venus and Fortuna, goddess of both good and bad fortune and personification of luck, whose iconography includes the rudder of a ship, found in some Pompeian examples of the regal Venus Physica. A form of Venus usually identified as Venus Felix was adopted by the dictator Sulla to legitimise his victories over his domestic and foreign opponents during Rome's late Republican civil and foreign wars; Rives finds it very unlikely that Sulla would have imposed this humiliating connection on unwilling or conquered domestic territories once allied to Samnium, such as Pompei. The emperor Hadrian built a temple to Venus Felix et Roma Aeterna on the Via Sacra. The same epithet is used for a specific sculpture at the Vatican Museums.

Venus Genetrix ("Venus the Mother"), as a goddess of motherhood and domesticity, with a festival on September 26, a personal ancestress of the Julian lineage and, more broadly, the divine ancestress of the Roman people. Julius Caesar dedicated a Temple of Venus Genetrix in 46 BC. This name has attached to an iconological type of statue of Aphrodite/Venus.

Venus Heliopolitana ("Venus of Heliopolis Syriaca"), a Romano-Syrian form of Venus at Baalbek, variously identified with Ashtart, Dea Syria and Atargatis, though inconsistently and often on very slender grounds. She has been historically identified as one third of a so-called Heliopolitan Triad, and thus a wife to presumed sun-god "Syrian Jupiter" (Baal) and mother of "Syrian Mercury" (Adon). The "Syrian Mercury" is sometimes thought as another sun-god, or a syncretised form of Bacchus as a "dying and rising" god, and thus a god of Springtime. No such Triad seems to have existed prior to Baalbek's 15 BC colonisation by Augustus's veterans. It may be a modern scholarly artifice.

Venus Kallipygos ("Venus with the beautiful buttocks"), a statue, and possibly a statue type, after a lost Greek original. From Syracuse, Sicily.

Venus Libertina ("Venus the Freedwoman"), probably arising through the semantic similarity and cultural links between libertina (as "a free woman") and lubentina (possibly meaning "pleasurable" or "passionate"). Further titles or variants acquired by Venus through the same process, or through orthographic variance, include Libentia, Lubentina, and Lubentini. Venus Libitina links Venus to a patron-goddess of funerals and undertakers, Libitina, who also became synonymous with death; a temple was dedicated to Venus Libitina in Libitina's grove on the Esquiline Hill, "hardly later than 300 BC". (Note: Eden (1963) states that Varro rationalises the connections as "lubendo libido, libidinosus ac Venus Libentina et Libitina")

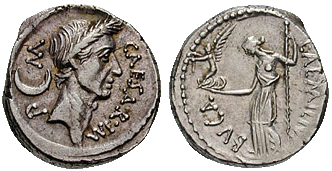
Julius Caesar, with Venus holding Victoria on reverse, from February or March 44 BC

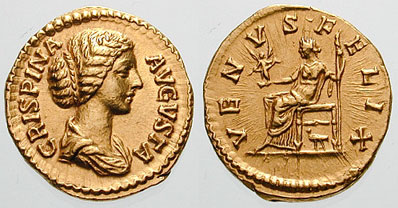
Crispina, wife of Commodus, with enthroned Venus Felix holding Victory on reverse

Venus Murcia ("Venus of the Myrtle"), merging Venus with the little-known deity Murcia (or Murcus, or Murtia). Murcia was associated with Rome's Mons Murcia (the Aventine's lesser height), and had a shrine in the Circus Maximus. Some sources associate her with the myrtle-tree. Christian writers described her as a goddess of sloth and laziness.

Venus Obsequens ("Indulgent Venus"), Venus's first attested Roman epithet. It was used in the dedication of her first Roman temple, on August 19 in 295 BC during the Third Samnite War by Quintus Fabius Maximus Gurges. It was sited somewhere near the Aventine Hill and Circus Maximus, and played a central role in the Vinalia Rustica. It was supposedly funded by fines imposed on women found guilty of adultery.

Venus Physica, Venus as a universal, natural creative force that informs the physical world. She is addressed as "Alma Venus" ("Mother Venus") by Lucretius in the introductory lines of his vivid, poetic exposition of Epicurean physics and philosophy, De Rerum Natura. She seems to have been a favourite of Lucretius's patron, Memmius.

Venus Physica Pompeiana was Pompeii's protective goddess, antedating Sulla's imposition of a colonia named Colonia Veneria Cornelia after his family and Venus, following his siege and capture of Pompeii from the Samnites. Venus also had a distinctive, local form as Venus Pescatrice ("Venus the Fisher-woman") a goddess of the sea, and trade. For Sulla's claims of Venus's favour, see Venus Felix above). Pompeii's Temple of Venus was built sometime in the 1st century BC, before Sulla's colonisation. This local form of Venus had Roman, Oscan and local Pompeiian influences. Like Venus Physica, Venus Physica Pompeiana is also a regal form of "Nature Mother" and a guarantor of success in love.

Venus Urania ("Heavenly Venus"), used as the title of a book by Basilius von Ramdohr, a relief by Pompeo Marchesi, and a painting by Christian Griepenkerl. (cf. Aphrodite Urania)

Venus Verticordia ("Venus the Changer of Hearts"), celebrated at the Veneralia for her ability to transform untethered desire (libido) into pudicitia, sexuality expressed within socially permitted bounds, hence marriage.

Venus Victrix ("Venus the Victorious"), a Romanised aspect of the armed Aphrodite that Greeks had inherited from the East, where the goddess Ishtar "remained a goddess of war, and Venus could bring victory to a Sulla or a Caesar". Pompey vied with his patron Sulla and with Caesar for public recognition as her protégé. In 55 BC he dedicated a temple to her at the top of his theater in the Campus Martius. She had a shrine on the Capitoline Hill, and festivals on August 12 and October 9. A sacrifice was annually dedicated to her on the latter date. In neo-classical art, her epithet as Victrix is often used in the sense of 'Venus Victorious over men's hearts' or in the context of the Judgement of Paris (e.g. Canova's Venus Victrix, a half-nude reclining portrait of Pauline Bonaparte).

== Cult history and temples ==
The first known temple to Venus was vowed to Venus Obsequens by Q. Fabius Gurges in the heat of a battle against the Samnites. It was dedicated in 295 BC, at a site near the Aventine Hill, and was supposedly funded by fines imposed on Roman women for sexual misdemeanours. Its rites and character were probably influenced by or based on Greek Aphrodite's cults, which were already diffused in various forms throughout Italian Magna Graeca. Its dedication date connects Venus Obsequens to the Vinalia rustica festival. (Note: Schilling (1954) suggests that Venus began as an abstraction of personal qualities, later assuming Aphrodite's attributes.)

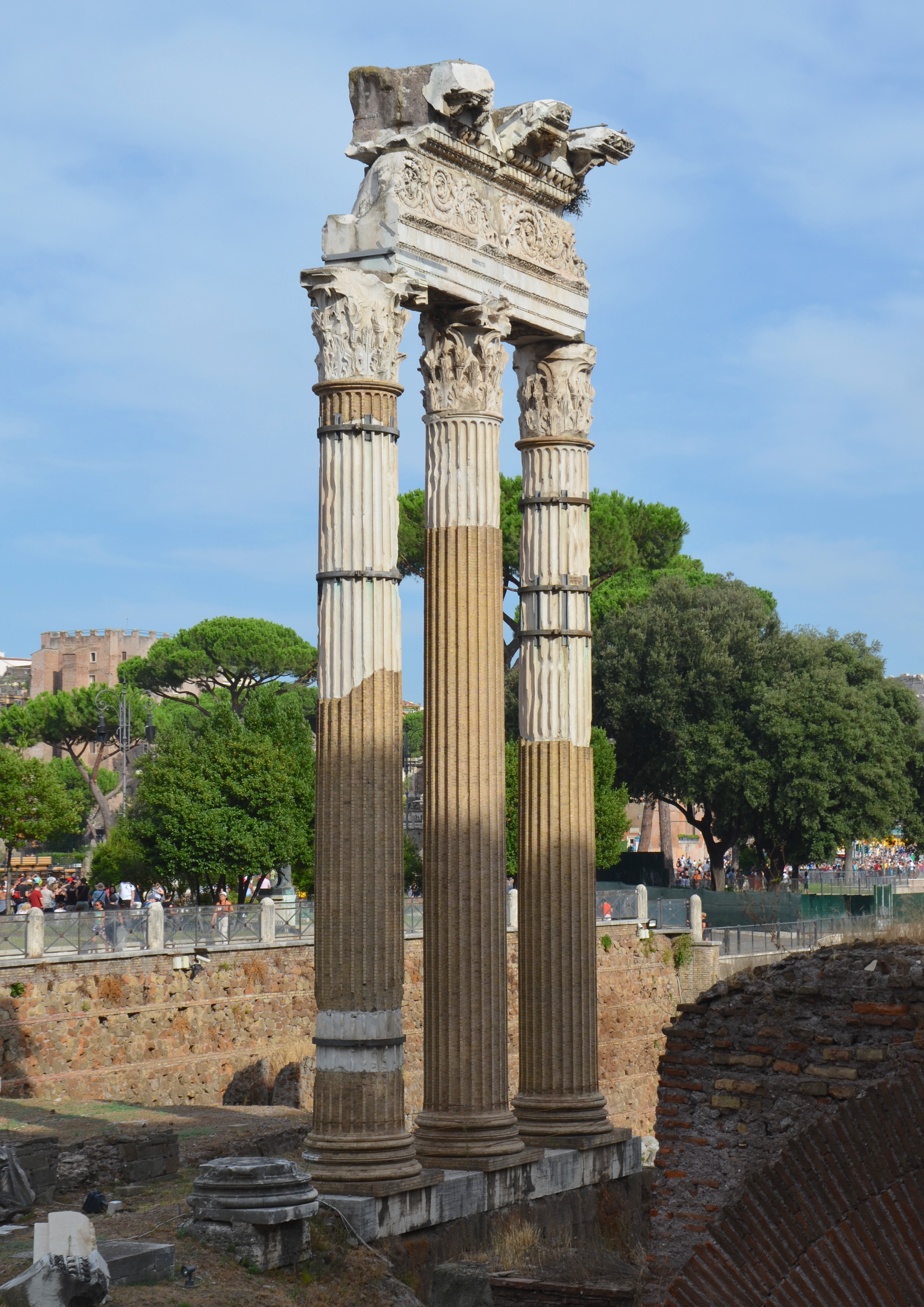
Remains of the Temple of Venus Genetrix in the Forum of Caesar, Rome

In 217 BC, in the early stages of the Second Punic War with Carthage, Rome suffered a disastrous defeat at the battle of Lake Trasimene. The Sibylline oracle suggested that Carthage might be defeated if the Venus of Eryx (Venus Erycina), patroness goddess of Carthage's Sicilian allies, could be persuaded to change her allegiance. Rome laid siege to Eryx and promised its goddess a magnificent temple as reward for her defection. They captured her image, brought it to Rome and installed it in a temple on the Capitoline Hill, as one of Rome's twelve dii consentes. Shorn of her more overtly Carthaginian characteristics, (Note: Her Sicilian form probably combined elements of Aphrodite and a more warlike Carthaginian-Phoenician Astarte) this "foreign Venus" became Rome's Venus Genetrix ("Venus the Mother"), Roman tradition made Venus the mother and protector of the Trojan prince Aeneas, ancestor of the Romans, so as far as the Romans were concerned, this was the homecoming of an ancestral goddess to her people. Soon after, Rome's defeat of Carthage confirmed Venus's goodwill to Rome, her links to its mythical Trojan past, and her support of its political and military hegemony. (Note: Venus's links with Troy can be traced to the epic, mythic history of the Trojan War, and the Judgement of Paris, in which the Trojan prince Paris chose Aphrodite over Hera and Athena, setting off a train of events that led to war between the Greeks and Trojans, and eventually to Troy's destruction. In Rome's foundation myth, Venus was the divine mother of the Trojan prince Aeneas, and thus a divine ancestor of the Roman people as a whole. The Punic Wars saw many similar introductions of foreign cult, including the Phrygian cult to Magna Mater, who also had mythical links to Troy. See also)

The Capitoline cult to Venus seems to have been reserved to higher status Romans. A separate cult to Venus Erycina as a fertility deity, was established in 181 BC, in a traditionally plebeian district just outside Rome's sacred boundary, near the Colline Gate. The temple, cult and goddess probably retained much of the original's character and rites. (Note: Lipka gives a foundation date of 181 BC for Venus's Colline temple.) Likewise, a shrine to Venus Verticordia ("Venus the changer of hearts"), established in 114 BC but with links to an ancient cult of Venus-Fortuna, was "bound to the peculiar milieu of the Aventine and the Circus Maximus" – a strongly plebeian context for Venus's cult, in contrast to her aristocratic cultivation as a Stoic and Epicurian "all-goddess". (Note: The aristocratic ideology of an increasingly Hellenised Venus is "summarized by the famous invocation to Venus Physica in Lucretius' poem.")

Towards the end of the Roman Republic, some leading Romans laid personal claims to Venus's favour. The general and dictator Sulla adopted Felix ("Lucky") as a surname, acknowledging his debt to heaven-sent good fortune and his particular debt to Venus Felix, for his extraordinarily fortunate political and military career. (Note: Plutarch's original Greek translates this adopted surname, Felix, as Epaphroditus (Aphrodite's beloved); see) His protégé Pompey competed for Venus's support, dedicating (in 55 BC) a large temple to Venus Victrix as part of his lavishly appointed new theatre, and celebrating his triumph of 54 BC with coins that showed her crowned with triumphal laurels.

Pompey's erstwhile friend, ally, and later opponent Julius Caesar went still further. He claimed the favours of Venus Victrix in his military success and Venus Genetrix as a personal, divine ancestress – apparently a long-standing family tradition among the Julii. When Caesar was assassinated, his heir, Augustus, adopted both claims as evidence of his inherent fitness for office, and divine approval of his rule. (Note: "At the battle of Pharsalus, Caesar also vowed a temple, in best republican fashion, to Venus Victrix, almost as if he were summoning Pompey's protectress to his side in the manner of an evocatio. Three years after Pompey's defeat at the battle of Actium, Caesar dedicated his new Roman Forum, complete with a temple to his ancestor Venus Genetrix, "apparently in fulfillment of the vow". The goddess helped provide a divine aura for her descendant, preparing the way for Caesar's own cult as a divus and the formal institution of the Roman Imperial cult.) Augustus's new temple to Mars Ultor, divine father of Rome's legendary founder Romulus, would have underlined the point, with the image of avenging Mars "almost certainly" accompanied by that of his divine consort Venus, and possibly a statue of the deceased and deified Caesar.

Vitruvius recommends that any new temple to Venus be sited according to rules laid down by the Etruscan haruspices, and built "near to the gate" of the city, where it would be less likely to contaminate "the matrons and youth with the influence of lust". He finds the Corinthian style, slender, elegant, enriched with ornamental leaves and surmounted by volutes, appropriate to Venus's character and disposition. (Note: Immediately after these remarks, Vitruvius prescribes the best positioning for temples to Venus's two divine consorts, Vulcan and Mars. Vulcan's should be outside the city, to reduce the dangers of fire, which is his element; Mars's too should be outside the city, so that "no armed frays may disturb the peace of the citizens, and that this divinity may, moreover, be ready to preserve them from their enemies and the perils of war.") Vitruvius recommends the widest possible spacing between the temple columns, producing a light and airy space, and he offers Venus's temple in Caesar's forum as an example of how not to do it; the densely spaced, thickset columns darken the interior, hide the temple doors and crowd the walkways, so that matrons who wish to honour the goddess must enter her temple in single file, rather than arm-in arm. (Note: The widely spaced, open style preferred by Vitruvius is eustylos. The densely pillared style he criticises is pycnostylos.)

In 135 AD the Emperor Hadrian inaugurated a temple to Venus and Roma Aeterna (Eternal Rome) on Rome's Velian Hill, underlining the Imperial unity of Rome and its provinces, and making Venus the protective genetrix of the entire Roman state, its people and fortunes. It was the largest temple in Ancient Rome.

=== Festivals ===
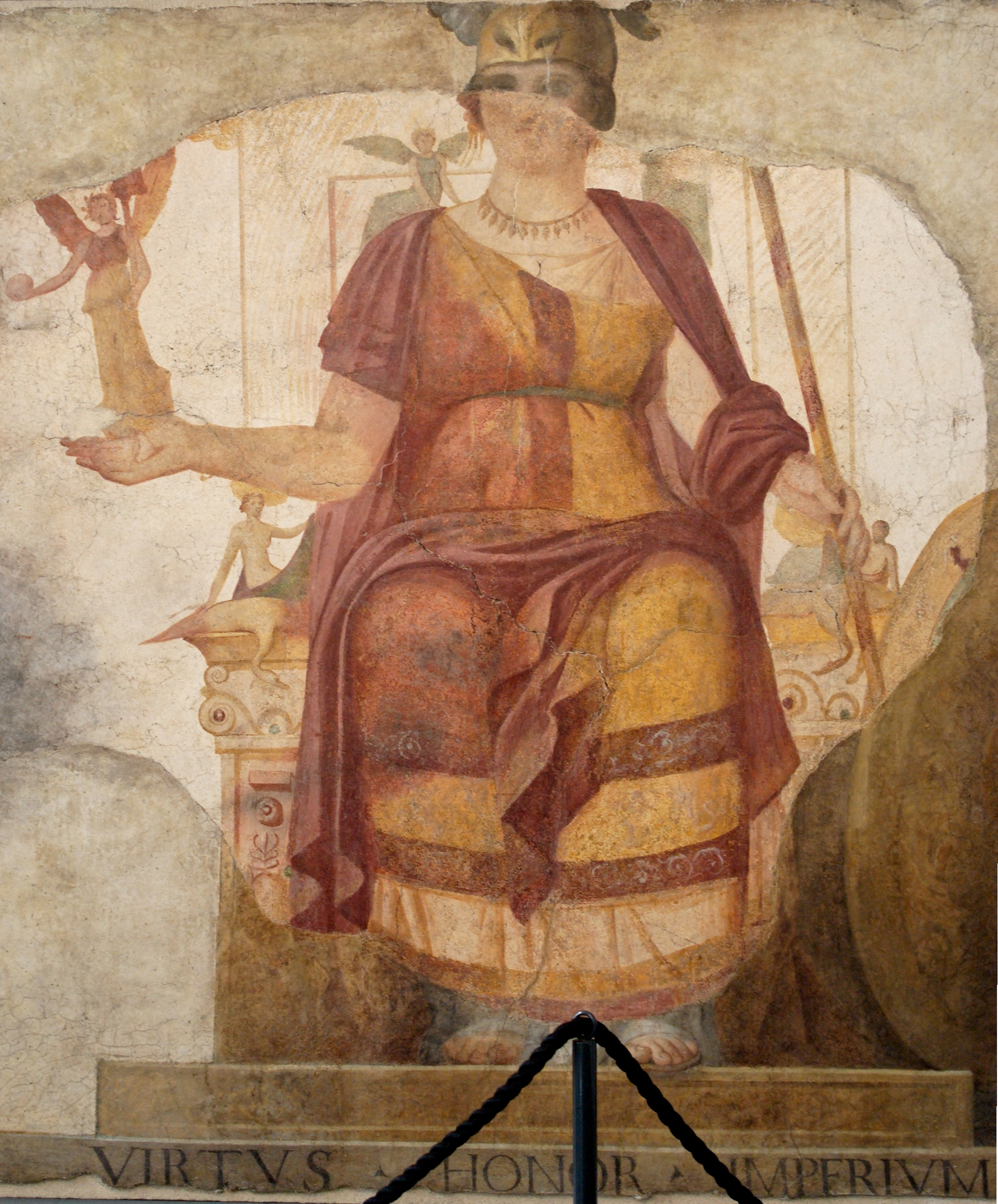
Fresco with a seated Venus, restored as a personification of Rome in the so-called "Dea Barberini" ("Barberini goddess"); Roman artwork, dated first half of the 4th century AD, from a room near the Baptistery of San Giovanni in Laterano

Venus was offered official (state-sponsored) cult in certain festivals of the Roman calendar. Her sacred month was April (Latin Mensis Aprilis) which Roman etymologists understood to derive from aperire, "to open", with reference to the springtime blossoming of trees and flowers. (Note: The origin is unknown, but it might derive from Apru, an Etruscan form of Greek Aphrodite's name.) In the interpretatio romana of the Germanic pantheon during the early centuries AD, Venus became identified with the Germanic goddess Frijjo, giving rise to the loan translation "Friday" for dies Veneris.

Veneralia (April 1) was held in honour of Venus Verticordia ("Venus the Changer of Hearts"), and Fortuna Virilis (Virile or strong Good Fortune)), whose cult was probably by far the older of the two. Venus Verticordia was invented in 220 BC, in response to advice from a Sibylline oracle during Rome's Punic Wars, (Note: Either the Sibylline Books, per Valerius Maximus. Factorum ac dictorum memorabilium libri IX [Nine books of memborable deeds and sayings]. 8.15.12; or the Cumaean Sibyl, per Ovid. Fasti. 4.155–62.) when a series of prodigies was taken to signify divine displeasure at sexual offenses among Romans of every category and class, including several men and three Vestal Virgins. The statue of Venus Verticordia was dedicated by a young woman, chosen as the most pudica (sexually pure) in Rome by a committee of Roman matrons. At first, this statue was probably housed in the temple of Fortuna Virilis, perhaps as divine reinforcement against the perceived moral and religious failings of its cult. In 114 BC Venus Verticordia was given her own temple. She was meant to persuade Romans of both sexes and every class, whether married or unmarried, to cherish the traditional sexual proprieties and morality known to please the gods and benefit the State. During her rites, her image was taken from her temple to the men's baths, where it was undressed and washed in warm water by her female attendants, then garlanded with myrtle. Women and men asked Venus Verticordia's help in affairs of the heart, sex, betrothal and marriage. For Ovid, Venus's acceptance of the epithet and its attendant responsibilities represented a change of heart in the goddess herself. (Note: Romans considered personal ethics or mentality to be functions of the heart.)

Vinalia urbana (April 23), a wine festival shared by Venus and Jupiter, king of the gods. It offered opportunity to supplicants to ask Venus's intercession with Jupiter, who was thought to be susceptible to her charms, and amenable to the effects of her wine. Venus was patroness of "profane" wine, for everyday human use. Jupiter was patron of the strongest, purest, sacrificial grade wine, and controlled the weather on which the autumn grape-harvest would depend. At this festival, men and women alike drank the new vintage of ordinary, non-sacral wine (pressed at the previous year's vinalia rustica) in honour of Venus, whose powers had provided humankind with this gift. Upper-class women gathered at Venus's Capitoline temple, where a libation of the previous year's vintage, sacred to Jupiter, was poured into a nearby ditch. Common girls (vulgares puellae) and prostitutes gathered at Venus's temple just outside the Colline gate, where they offered her myrtle, mint, and rushes concealed in rose-bunches and asked her for "beauty and popular favour", and to be made "charming and witty". (Note: Staples citing Ovid. Fasti. 4.863–72.)

Vinalia Rustica (August 19), originally a rustic Latin festival of wine, vegetable growth and fertility. This was almost certainly Venus's oldest festival and was associated with her earliest known form, Venus Obsequens. Kitchen gardens and market-gardens, and presumably vineyards were dedicated to her. (Note: Vegetable-growers may have been involved in the dedications as a corporate guild.) Roman opinions differed on whose festival it was. Varro insists that the day was sacred to Jupiter, whose control of the weather governed the ripening of the grapes; but the sacrificial victim, a female lamb (agna), may be evidence that it once belonged to Venus alone. (Note: For associations of kind between Roman deities and their sacrificial victims, see Victima.) (Note: Varro explicitly denies that the festival belongs to Venus; that implies he was aware of opposite scholarly and / or commonplace opinion. Lipka (2009) offers this apparent contradiction as an example of two Roman cults that offer "complementary functional foci".)

A festival of Venus Genetrix (September 26) was held under state auspices from 46 BC at her Temple in the Forum of Caesar, in fulfillment of a vow by Julius Caesar, who claimed her personal favour as his divine patroness, and ancestral goddess of the Julian clan. Caesar dedicated the temple during his extraordinarily lavish quadruple triumph. At the same time, he was pontifex maximus and Rome's senior magistrate; the festival is thought to mark the unprecedented promotion of a personal, family cult to one of the Roman state. Caesar's heir, Augustus, made much of these personal and family associations with Venus as an Imperial deity. (Note: Sulla may have set some form of precedent, but there is no evidence that he built her a Temple. Caesar's associations with Venus as both a personal and state goddess may also have been propagated in the Roman provinces.) The festival's rites are not known.

== Mythology and literature ==
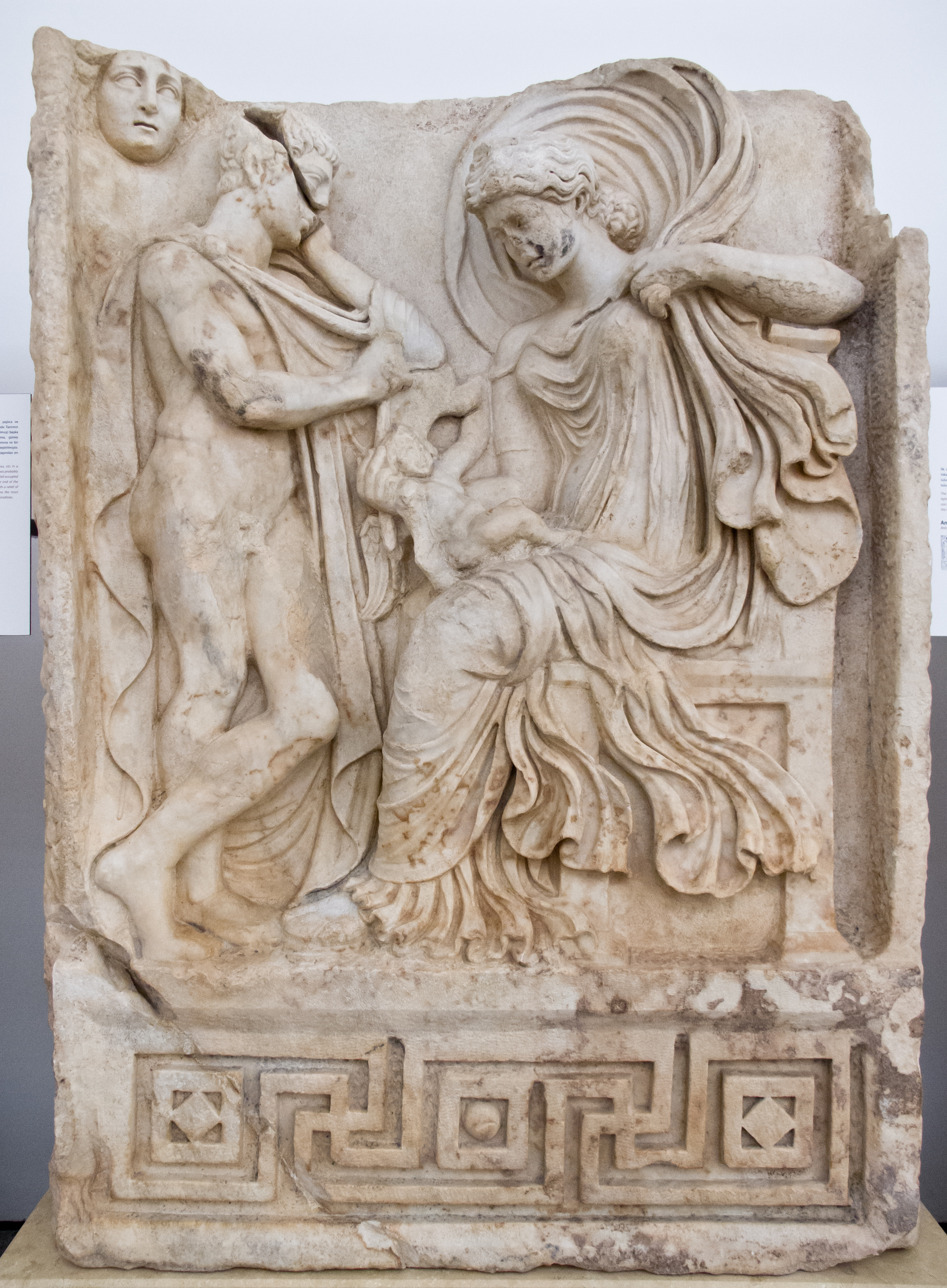
A Venus-Aphrodite velificans holding an infant, probably Aeneas, (Note: Sometimes interpreted as Eros-Cupid, as a symbol of the sexual union between the goddess and Anchises, but perhaps alluding also to the scene in the Aeneid when Dido holds Cupid disguised as Ascanius in her lap as she falls in love with Aeneas.) as Anchises and Luna-Selene look on (Roman-era relief from Aphrodisias)

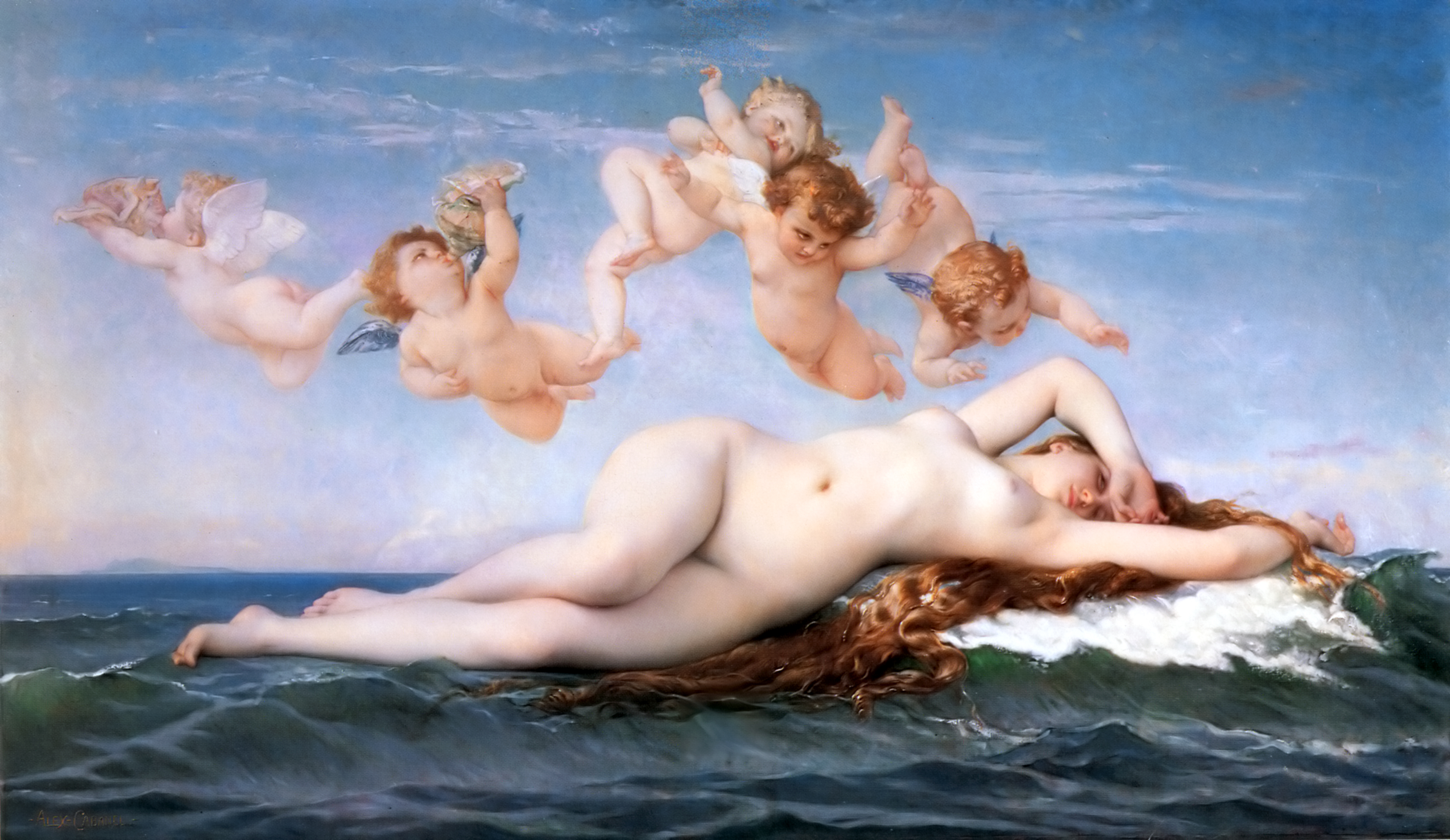
The Birth of Venus (1863) by Alexandre Cabanel

As with most major gods and goddesses in Roman mythology, the literary concept of Venus is mantled in whole-cloth borrowings from the literary Greek mythology of her counterpart, Aphrodite, but with significant exceptions. In some Latin mythology, Cupid was the son of Venus and Mars, the god of war. At other times, or in parallel myths and theologies, Venus was understood to be the consort of Vulcan or as mother of the "second cupid", fathered by Mercury. (Note: Cicero, On the nature of the Gods, 3.59 - 3.60; "The first Venus is the daughter of the Sky and the Day; I have seen her temple at Elis. The second was engendered from the sea‑foam, and as we are told became the mother by Mercury of the second Cupid. The third is the daughter of Jupiter and Dione, who wedded Vulcan, but who is said to have been the mother of Anteros by Mars. The fourth was conceived of Syria and Cyprus and is called Astarte; it is recorded that she married Adonis.") Virgil, in compliment to his patron Augustus and the gens Julia, embellished an existing connection between Venus, whom Julius Caesar had adopted as his protectress, and the Trojan prince Aeneas, refugee from Troy's destruction and eventual ancestor of the Roman people. Virgil's Aeneas is guided to Latium by Venus in her heavenly form, the morning star, shining brightly before him in the daylight sky; much later, she lifts Caesar's soul to heaven. (Note: Venus as a guide and protector of Aeneas and his descendants is a frequent motif in the Aeneid. See discussion throughout Williams (2003).) In Ovid's Fasti Venus came to Rome because she "preferred to be worshipped in the city of her own offspring". (Note: Orlin, citing Ovid. Fasti. 4.876.) In Virgil's poetic account of Octavian's victory at the sea-battle of Actium, the future emperor is allied with Venus, Neptune and Minerva. Octavian's opponents, Antony, Cleopatra and the Egyptians, assisted by bizarre and unhelpful Egyptian deities such as "barking" Anubis, lose the battle.

== The Cupids ==
Cupid (lust or desire) and Amor (affectionate love) are taken to be different names for the same Roman love-god, the son of Venus, fathered by Mercury, Vulcan or Mars. Childlike or boyish winged figures who accompany Venus, whether singly, in pairs or more, have been variously identified as Amores, Cupids, Erotes or forms of Greek Eros. The most ancient of these is Eros, whom Hesiod categorises as a primordial deity, emerging from Chaos as a generative power with neither mother nor father. Eros was the patron deity of Thespiae, where he was embodied as an aniconic stone as late as the 2nd century AD. From at least the 5th century BC he also had the form of an adolescent or pre-adolescent male, at Elis (on the Peloponnese) and elsewhere in Greece, acquiring wings, bow and arrows, and divine parents in the love-goddess Aphrodite and the war-god Ares. He had temples of his own, and shared others with Aphrodite.

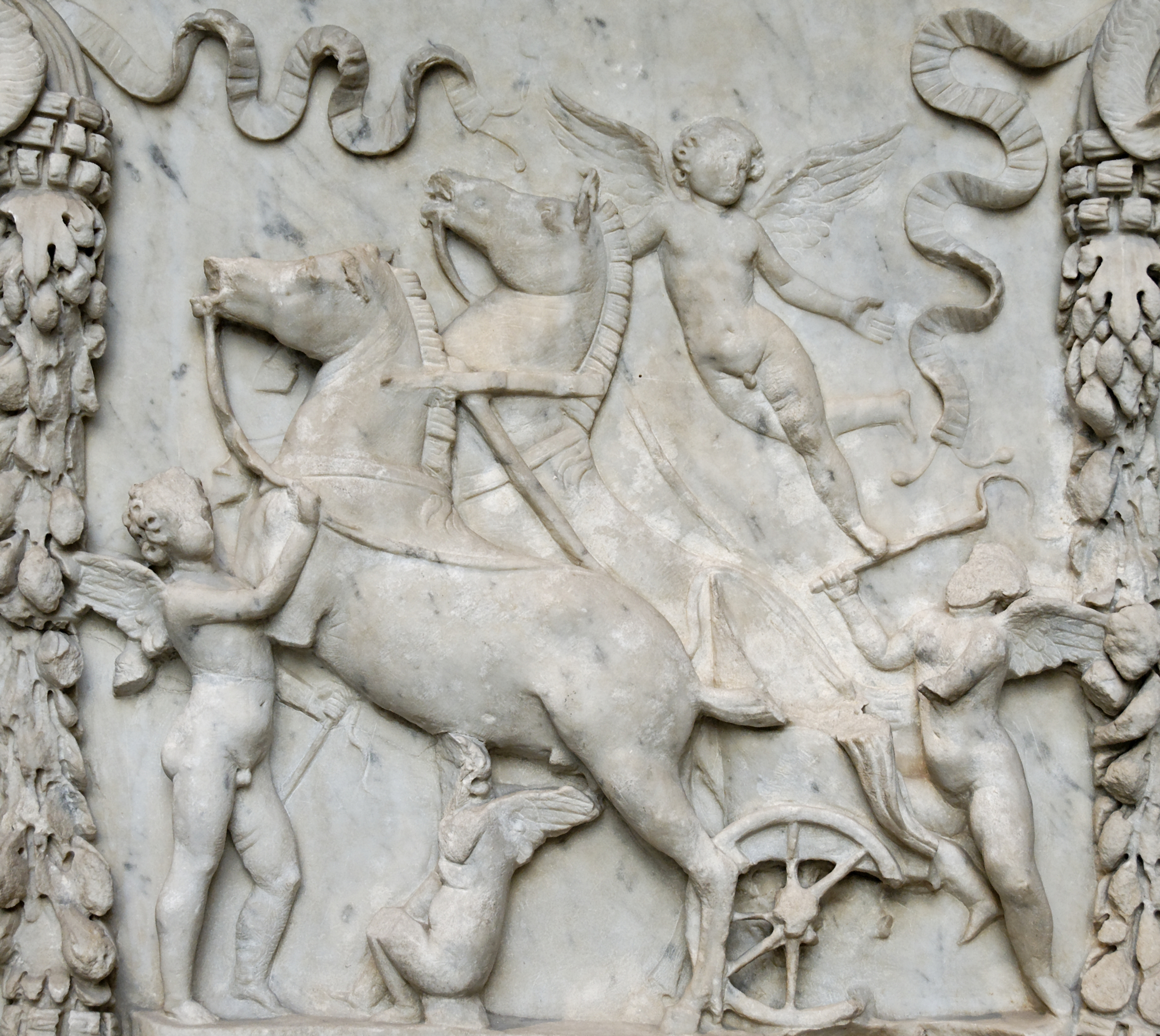
Fragmentary base for an altar of Venus and Mars, showing cupids or erotes playing with the war-god's weapons and chariot. From the reign of Trajan (98–117 AD)

At Elis, and in Athens, Eros shared cult with a twin, named Anteros. Xenophon's Socratic Symposion 8. 1, features a dinner-guest with eros (love) for his wife; in return, she has anteros (reciprocal love) for him. Some sources suggest Anteros as avenger of "slighted love". In Servius's 4th century commentary on Virgil's Aeneas, Cupid is a deceptive agent of Venus, impersonating Aeneas's son and making Dido, queen of Carthage, forget her husband. When Aeneas rejects her love, and covertly leaves Carthage to fulfill his destiny as ancestor of the Roman people, Dido is said to invoke Anteros as "contrary to Cupid". She falls into hatred and despair, curses Rome, and when Aeneas leaves, commits suicide. (Note: Cicero presents Anteros as a "third Cupid", fathered by Mars and birthed by a "third Venus", the huntress Diana (more usually described as virgin). See Cicero, On the nature of the Gods, 3.59-3.60)

Ovid's Fasti, Book 4, invokes Venus not by name but as "Mother of the Twin Loves", the gemini amores. (Note: Ovid, Fasti, 4, 1: Amores, 3. 15. 1: Heroides, 7. 59: 16. 203. See also Catullus C. 3. 1, 13. 2: Horace, 1. 19. 1 :4. 1. 5.) "Amor" is the Latin name preferred by Roman poets and literati for the personification of "kindly" love. Where Cupid (lust) can be imperious, cruel, prone to mischief or even war-like, Amor softly persuades. Cato the Elder, having a Stoic's outlook, sees Cupid as a deity of greed and blind passion, morally inferior to Amor. The Roman playwright Plautus, however, has Venus, Cupid and Amor working together.

In Roman cult inscriptions and theology, "Amor" is rare, and "Cupido" relatively common. No Roman temples seem dedicated to Cupid alone but the joint dedication formula Venus Cupidoque ("Venus and Cupid") is evidence of his cult, shared with Venus at her Temple just outside the Colline Gate and elsewhere. He would also have featured in many private household cults. In private and public areas alike, statues of Venus and Mars attended by Cupid, or Venus, Cupid and minor erotes were sometimes donated by wealthy sponsors, to serve both religious and artistic purposes. Cupid's roles in literary myth are usually limited to actions on behalf of Venus; in Cupid and Psyche, one of the stories within The Golden Ass, by the Roman author Apuleius, the plot and its resolution are driven by Cupid's love for Psyche ("soul"), his filial disobedience, and his mother's envy.

== Iconography ==
=== Signs, context and symbols ===
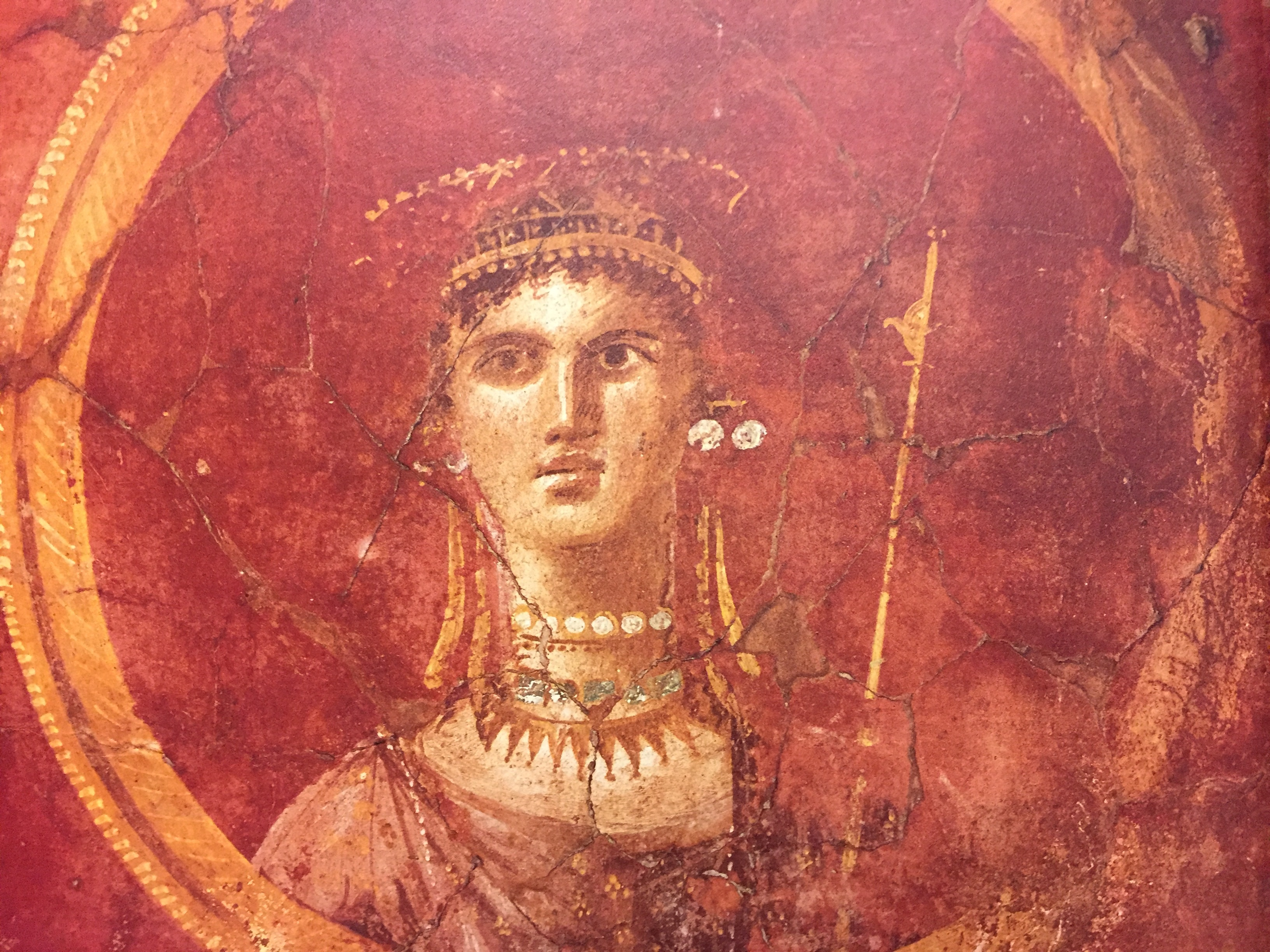
A medallion painting from the House of Marcus Fabius Rufus in Pompeii, Italy, executed in the Second Style and depicting the Greco-Roman goddess Venus-Aphrodite in regalia, with diadem and scepter; it is dated to the 1st century BC.

Images of Venus have been found in domestic murals, mosaics and household shrines (lararia). Petronius, in his Satyricon, places an image of Venus among the Lares (household gods) of the freedman Trimalchio's lararium.

The Venus types known as Venus Pompeiana ("Venus of Pompeii") and Venus Pescatrice ("Venus the Fisher-woman") are almost exclusive to Pompeii. Both forms of Venus are represented within Pompeian homes of the well-off, with Venus Pompeiana more commonly found in formal reception spaces, typically depicted in full regalia, draped with a mantle, standing rigidly upright with her right arm across her chest. Images of Venus Pescatrice tend to be more playful, usually found in less formal and less public "non-reception" areas: here, she usually holds a fishing rod, and sits amidst landscape scenery, accompanied by at least one cupid.

Venus's signs are for the most part the same as Aphrodite's. They include roses, which were offered in Venus's Porta Collina rites, (Note: Eden (1963), citing Ovid. Fasti. 4:869–70, cf. I35–I38. Ovid describes the rites observed in the early Imperial era, when the temple environs were part of the Gardens of Sallust.) and above all, myrtle (Latin myrtus), which was cultivated for its white, sweetly scented flowers, aromatic, evergreen leaves and its various medical-magical properties. Venus's statues, and her worshipers, wore myrtle crowns at her festivals. Before its adoption into Venus's cults, myrtle was used in the purification rites of Cloacina, the Etruscan-Roman goddess of Rome's main sewer; later, Cloacina's association with Venus's sacred plant made her Venus Cloacina. Likewise, Roman folk-etymology transformed the ancient, obscure goddess Murcia into "Venus of the Myrtles, whom we now call Murcia". (Note: Eden (1963) citing Pliny the Elder, Natural History, 15,119–21) (Note: Murcia had a shrine at the Circus Maximus.)

Myrtle was thought a particularly potent aphrodisiac. As goddess of love and sex, Venus played an essential role at Roman prenuptial rites and wedding nights, so myrtle and roses were used in bridal bouquets. Marriage itself was not a seduction but a lawful condition, under Juno's authority; so myrtle was excluded from the bridal crown. Venus was also a patroness of the ordinary, everyday wine drunk by most Roman men and women; the seductive powers of wine were well known. In the rites to Bona Dea, a goddess of female chastity, (Note: "Bona Dea" means "The Good Goddess". She was also a "Women's goddess".) Venus, myrtle and anything male were not only excluded, but unmentionable. The rites allowed women to drink the strongest, sacrificial wine, otherwise reserved for the Roman gods and Roman men; the women euphemistically referred to it as "honey". Under these special circumstances, they could get virtuously, religiously drunk on strong wine, safe from male intrusion and Venus's temptations. Outside of this context, ordinary wine (that is, Venus's wine) tinctured with myrtle oil was thought particularly suitable for women.

Venus's long association with wine reflects the inevitable connections between wine, intoxication and sex, expressed in the proverbial phrase sine Cerere et Baccho friget Venus (loosely translated as "without food and wine, Venus freezes"). It was used in various forms, notably by the Roman playwright, Terence, probably by others before him, and certainly into the early modern era. Although Venus played a central role in several wine festivals, the Roman god of wine was Bacchus, identified with Greek Dionysus and the early Roman wine-god Liber Pater (Father of Freedom).

Roman generals given an ovation, a lesser form of Roman triumph, wore a myrtle crown, perhaps to purify themselves and their armies of blood-guilt. The ovation ceremony was assimilated to Venus Victrix ("Victorious Venus"), who was held to have granted and purified its relatively "easy" victory.

=== Classical art ===
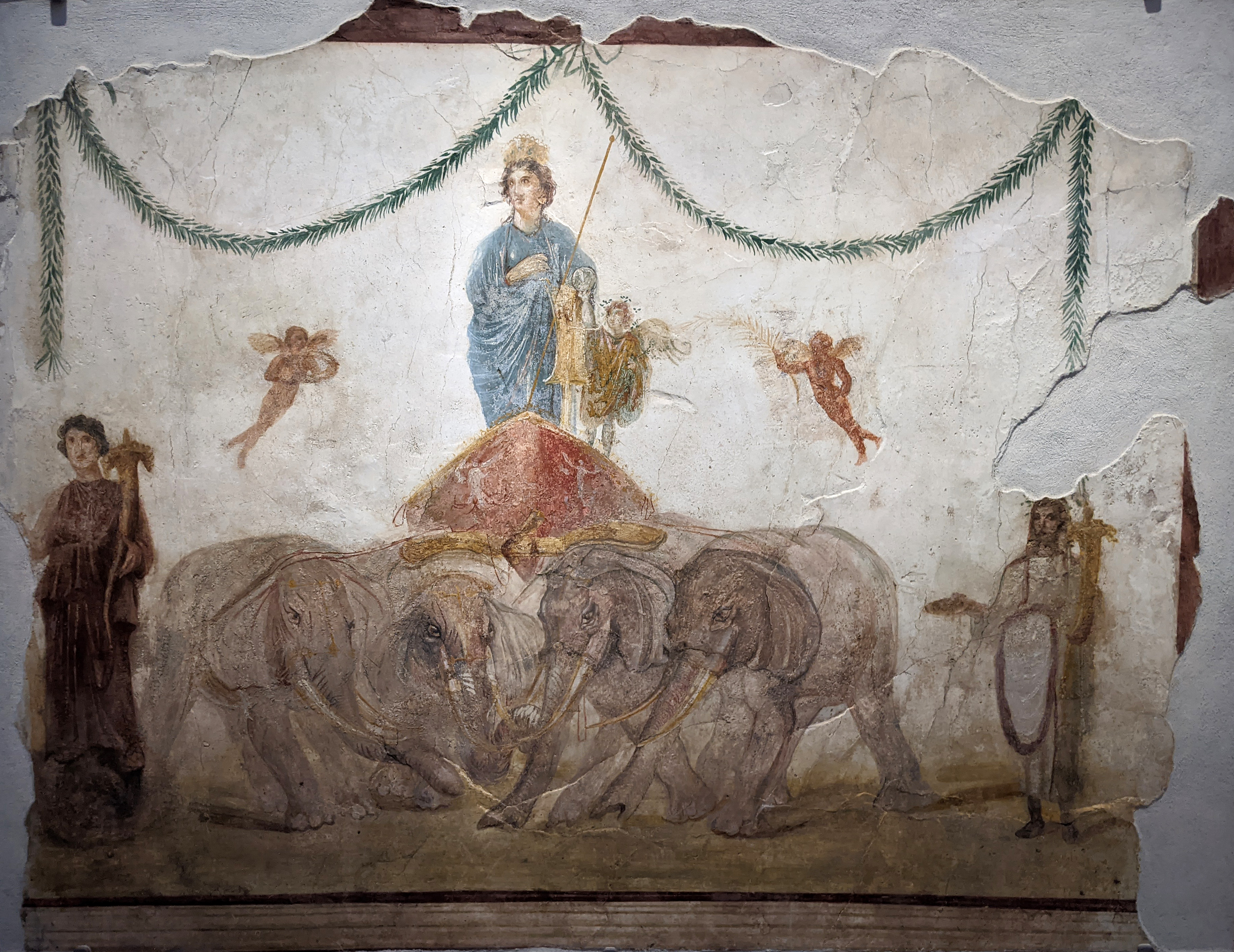
Venus riding a quadriga of elephants, fresco from Pompeii, 1st century AD

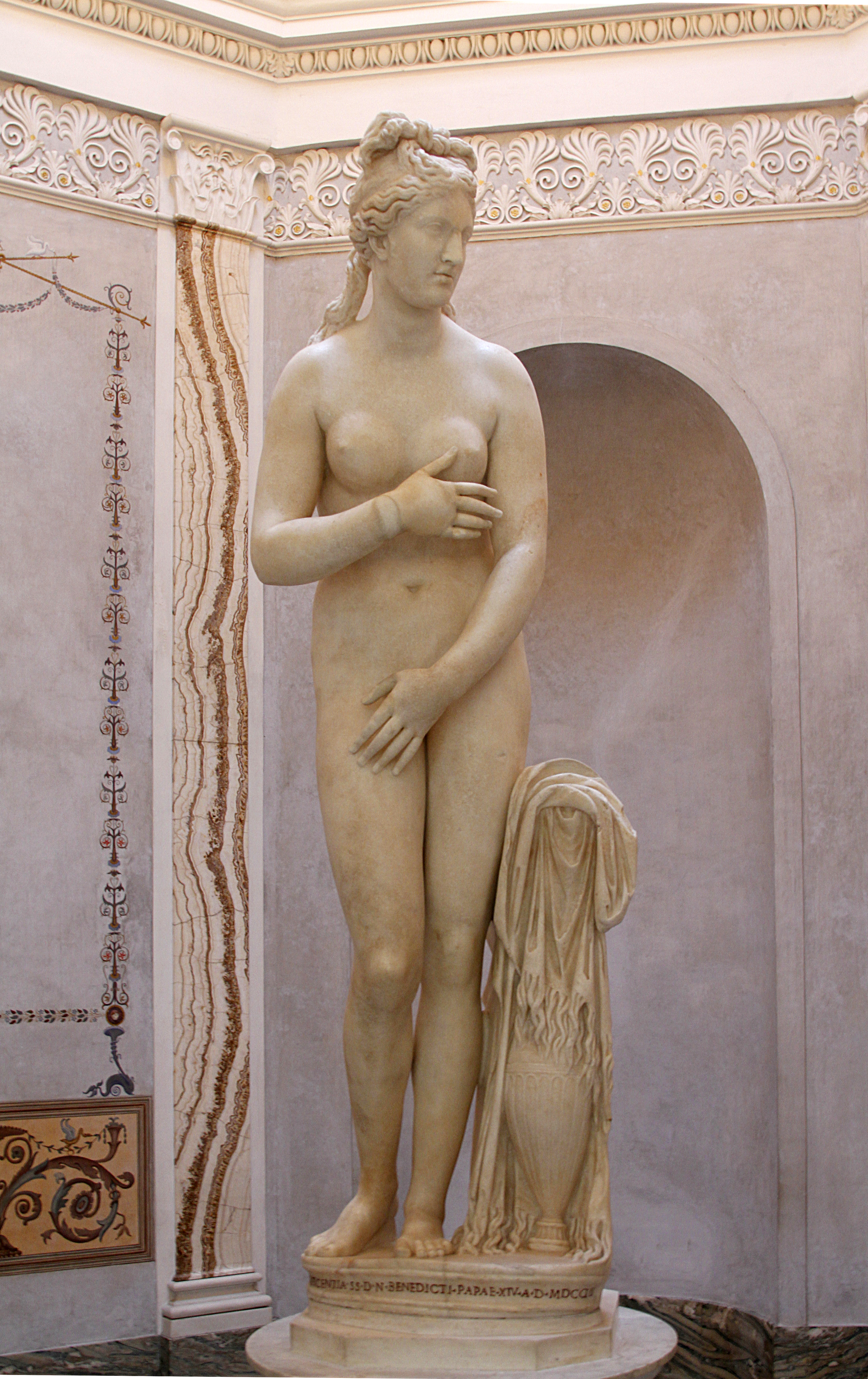
Statue of Venus of the Capitoline type, Roman, 2nd century AD, from Campo Iemini, housed in the British Museum

Roman and Hellenistic art produced many variations on the goddess, often based on the Praxitlean type Aphrodite of Cnidus. Many female nudes from this period of sculpture whose subjects are unknown are in modern art history conventionally called "Venus", even if they originally may have portrayed a mortal woman rather than operated as a cult statue of the goddess.

Examples include:

- Venus de Milo (130 BC)
- Venus Pudica

- Capitoline Venus
- Venus de' Medici

- Esquiline Venus
- Venus Felix
- Venus of Arles
- Venus Anadyomene (also here)
- Venus, Pan and Eros
- Venus Genetrix
- Venus of Capua
- Venus Kallipygos

== Post-classical culture ==
=== Medieval art ===
Venus is remembered in De Mulieribus Claris, a collection of biographies of historical and mythological women by the Florentine author Giovanni Boccaccio, composed in 1361–62. It is notable as the first collection devoted exclusively to biographies of women in Western literature.

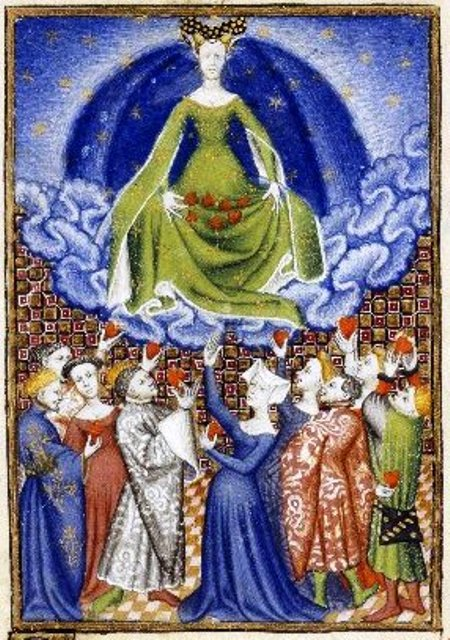
Medieval representation of Venus, sitting on a rainbow, with her devotees who offer their hearts to her, 15th century.

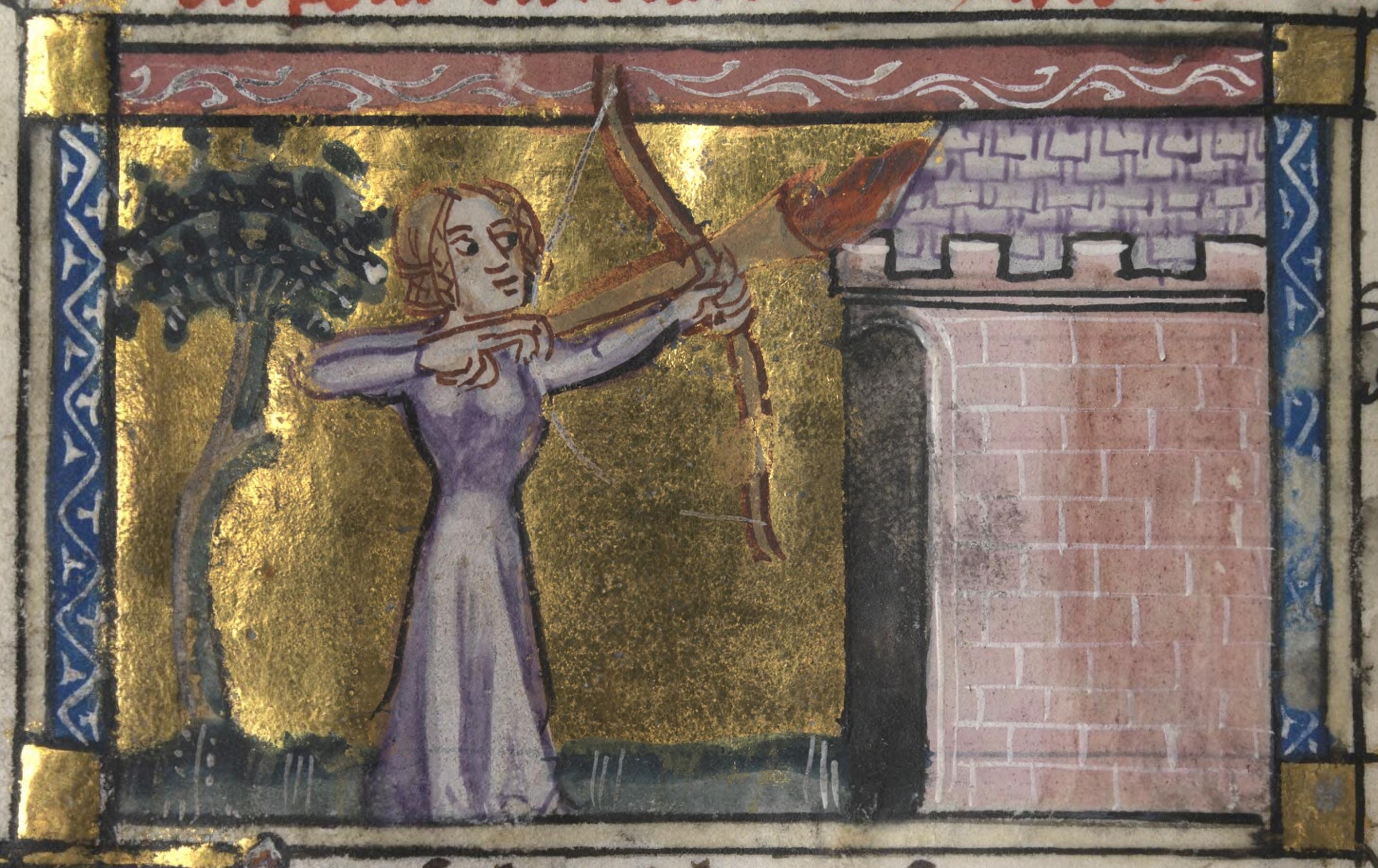
Venus, setting fire to the castle where the Rose is imprisoned, in the medieval French romance Roman de la Rose. In this story Venus is portrayed as the mother of Cupid

=== Art in the classical tradition ===
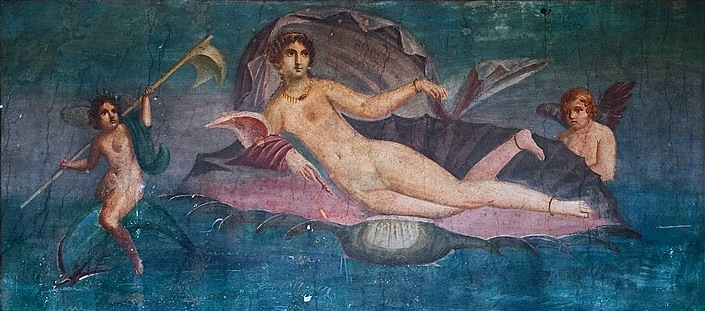
Venus rising from the sea, alluding to the birth-myth of Greek Aphrodite. From a garden wall at the Casa della Venere in conchiglia, Pompeii. Before AD 79

Venus became a popular subject of painting and sculpture during the Renaissance period in Europe. As a "classical" figure for whom nudity was her natural state, it was socially acceptable to depict her unclothed. As the goddess of sexuality, a degree of erotic beauty in her presentation was justified, which appealed to many artists and their patrons. Over time, venus came to refer to any artistic depiction in post-classical art of a nude woman, even when there was no indication that the subject was the goddess.

The Birth of Venus, by Sandro Botticelli c. 1485–1486.

Venus, Mars, and Vulcan, by Tintoretto

- The Birth of Venus (Botticelli) (c. 1485)
- Sleeping Venus (c. 1501)
- Venus of Urbino (1538)
- Venus with a Mirror (c. 1555)
- Rokeby Venus (1647–1651)
- Olympia (1863)
- The Birth of Venus (Cabanel) (1863)
- The Birth of Venus (Bouguereau) (1879)
- Venus of Cherchell, Gsell museum in Algeria
- Venus Victrix, and Venus Italica by Antonio Canova

In the field of prehistoric art, since the discovery in 1908 of the so-called "Venus of Willendorf" small Neolithic sculptures of rounded female forms have been conventionally referred to as Venus figurines. Although the name of the actual deity is not known, the knowing contrast between the obese and fertile cult figures and the classical conception of Venus has raised resistance to the terminology.

=== Gallery ===
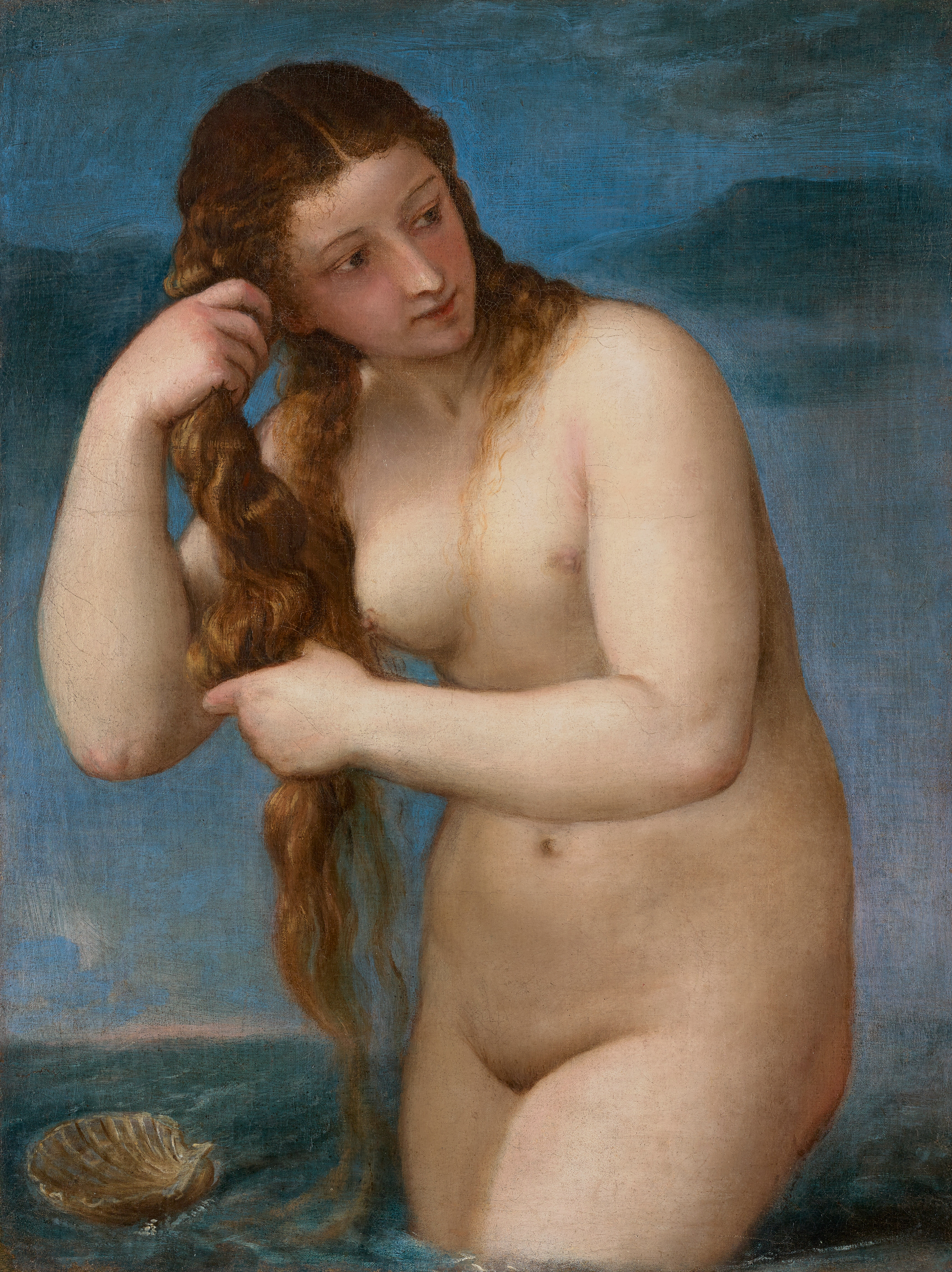
Venus Anadyomene (c. 1525) by Titian

Venus with a Mirror (c. 1555) by Titian

Venus by Frans Floris, Hallwyl Museum

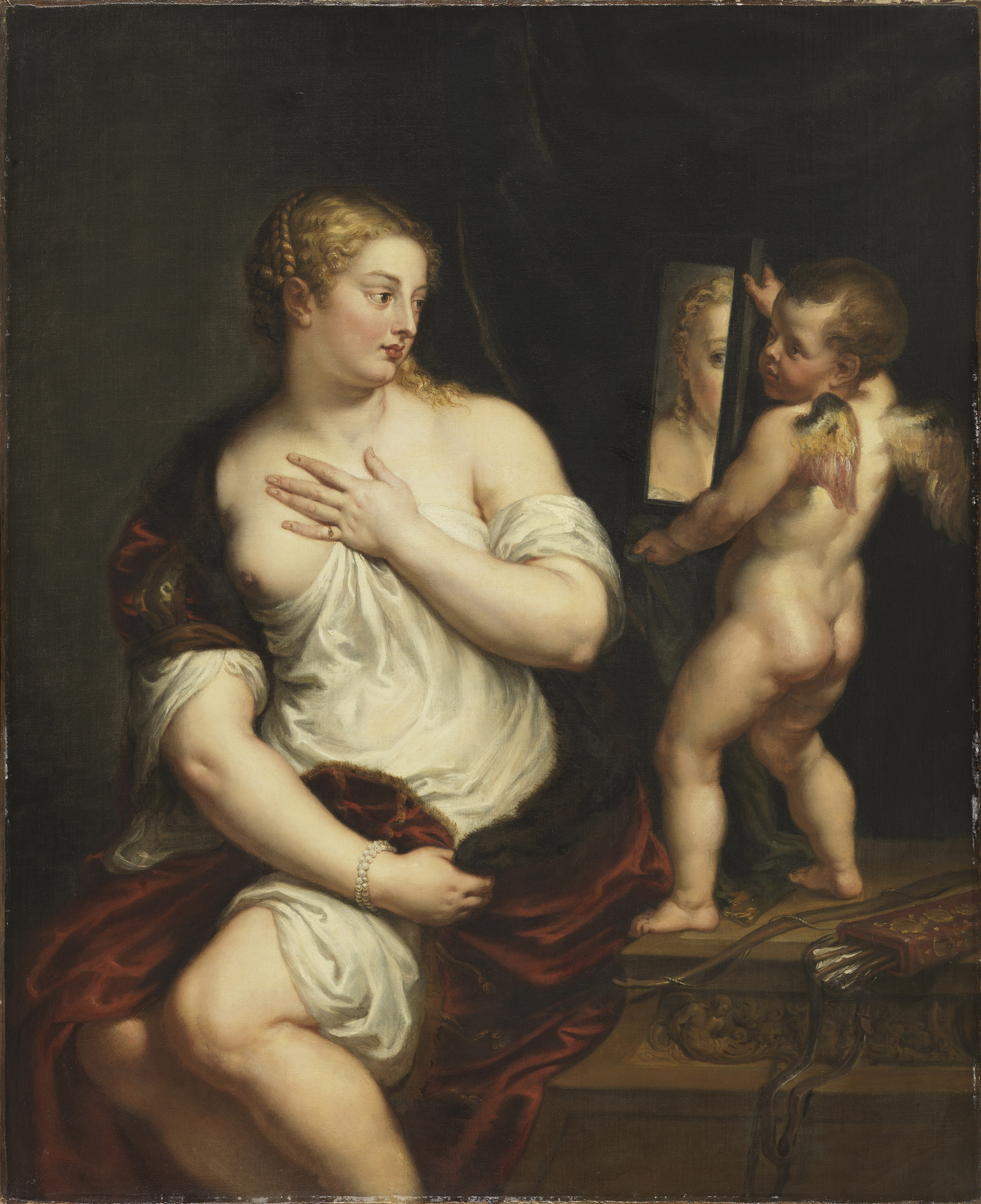
Venus and Cupid, painting (c. 1650–1700) by Peter Paul Rubens

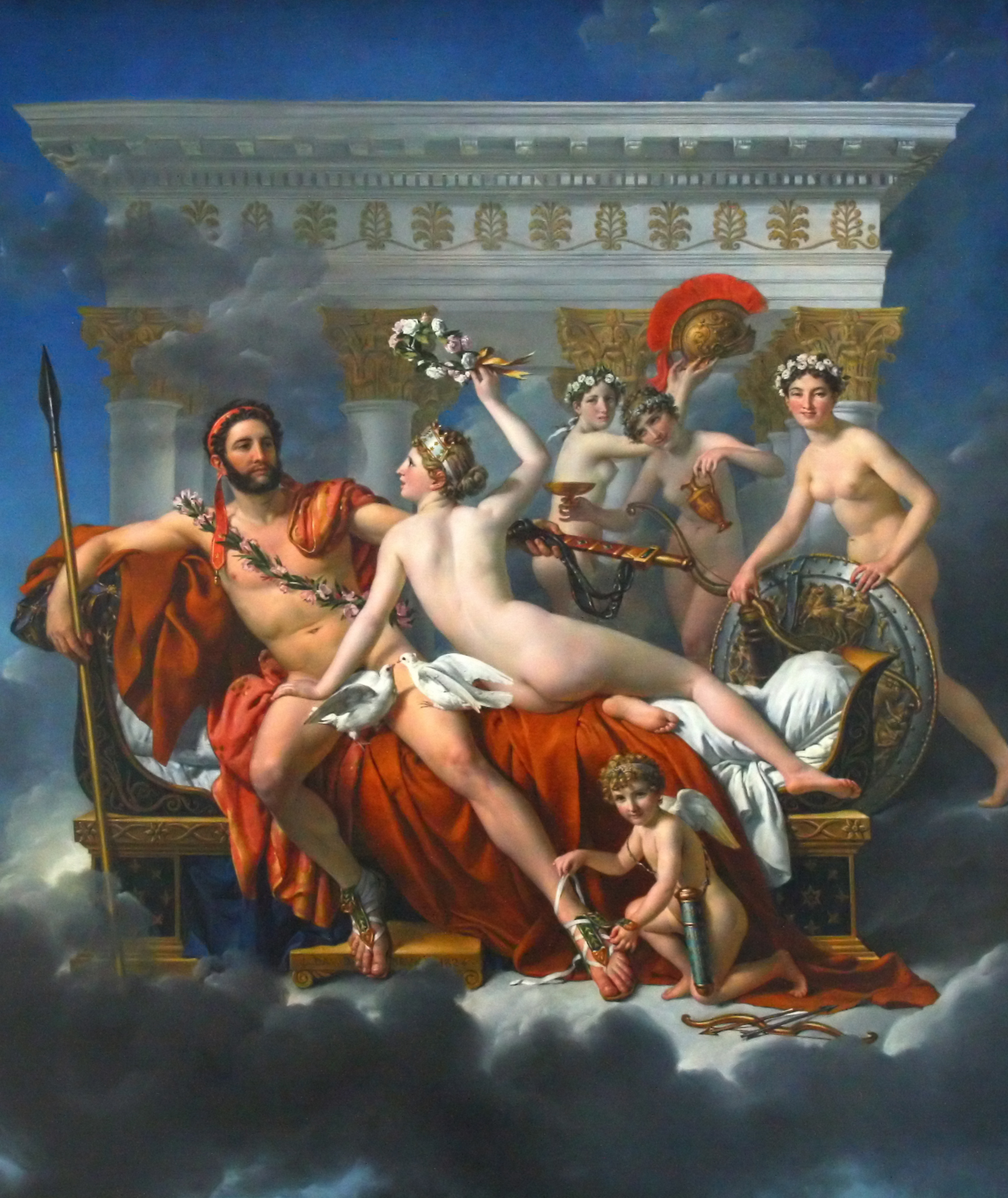
Mars Being Disarmed by Venus (1822–1825) by Jacques-Louis David

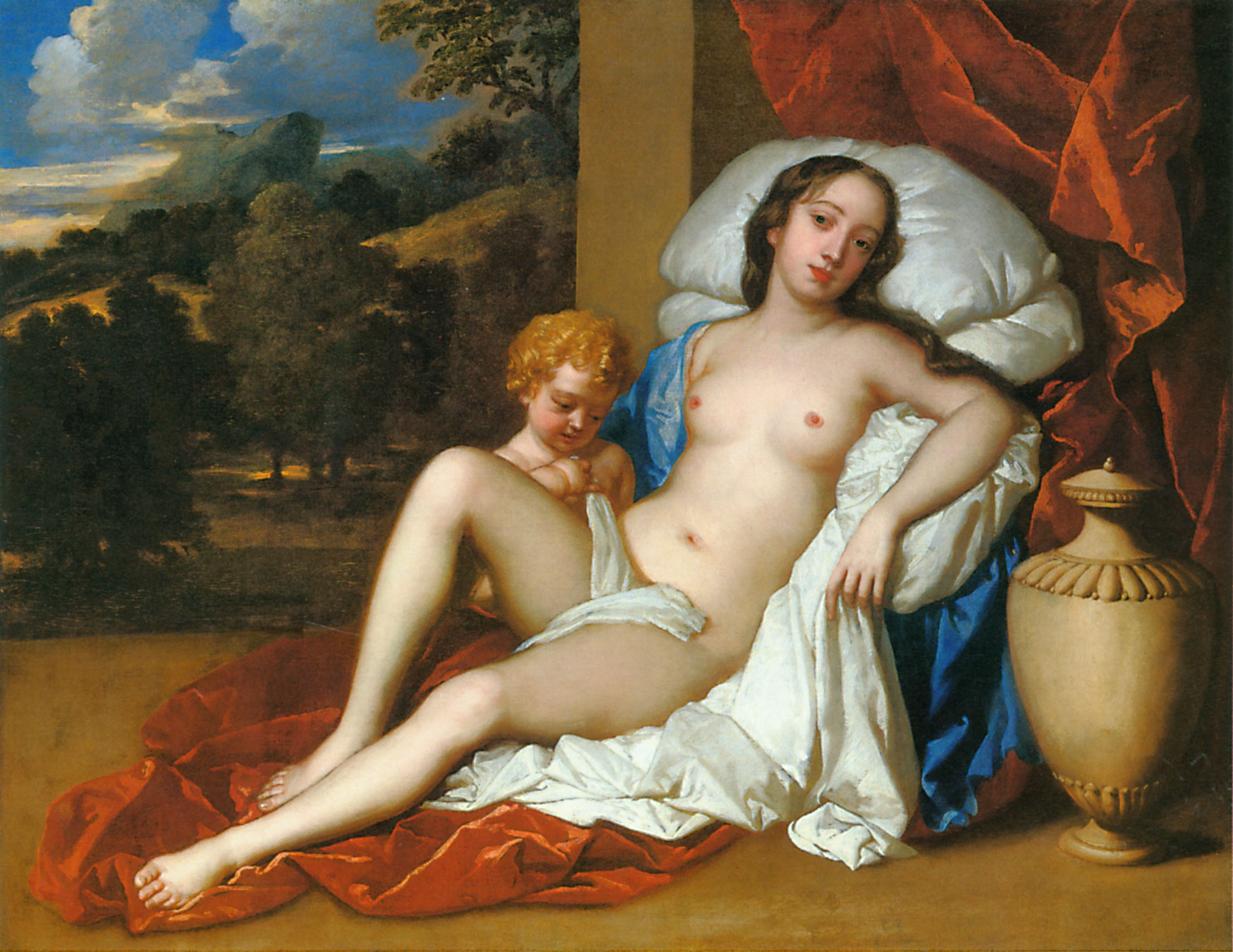
Nell Gwynne, one of the long-time mistresses of King Charles II of England, as Venus with her son as Cupid (c. 1665) by Peter Lely

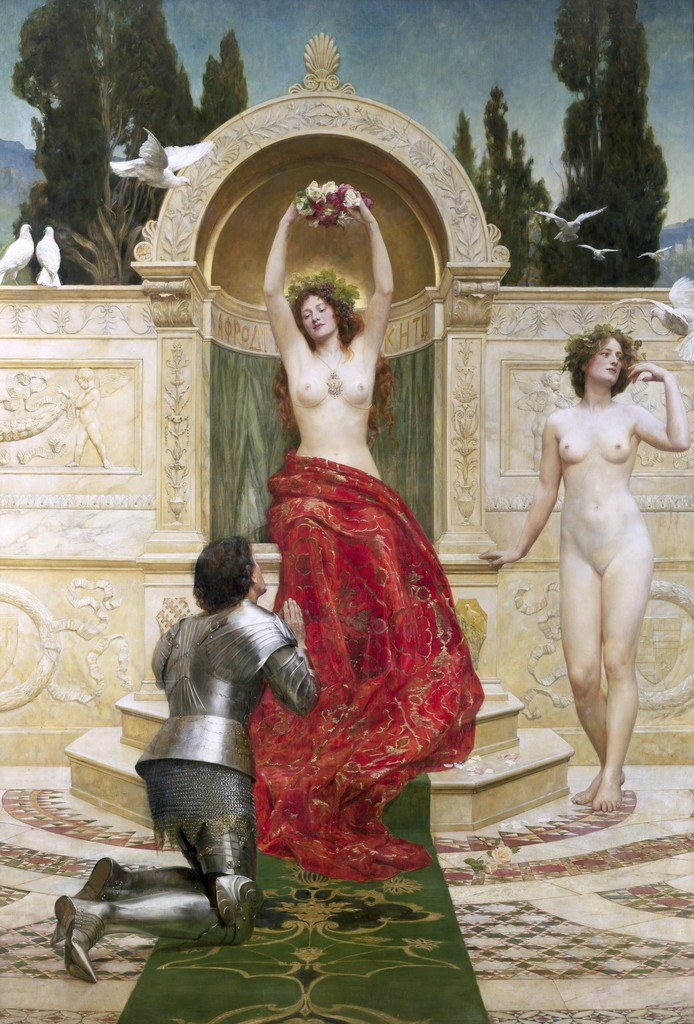
In the Venusberg (1901) by John Collier

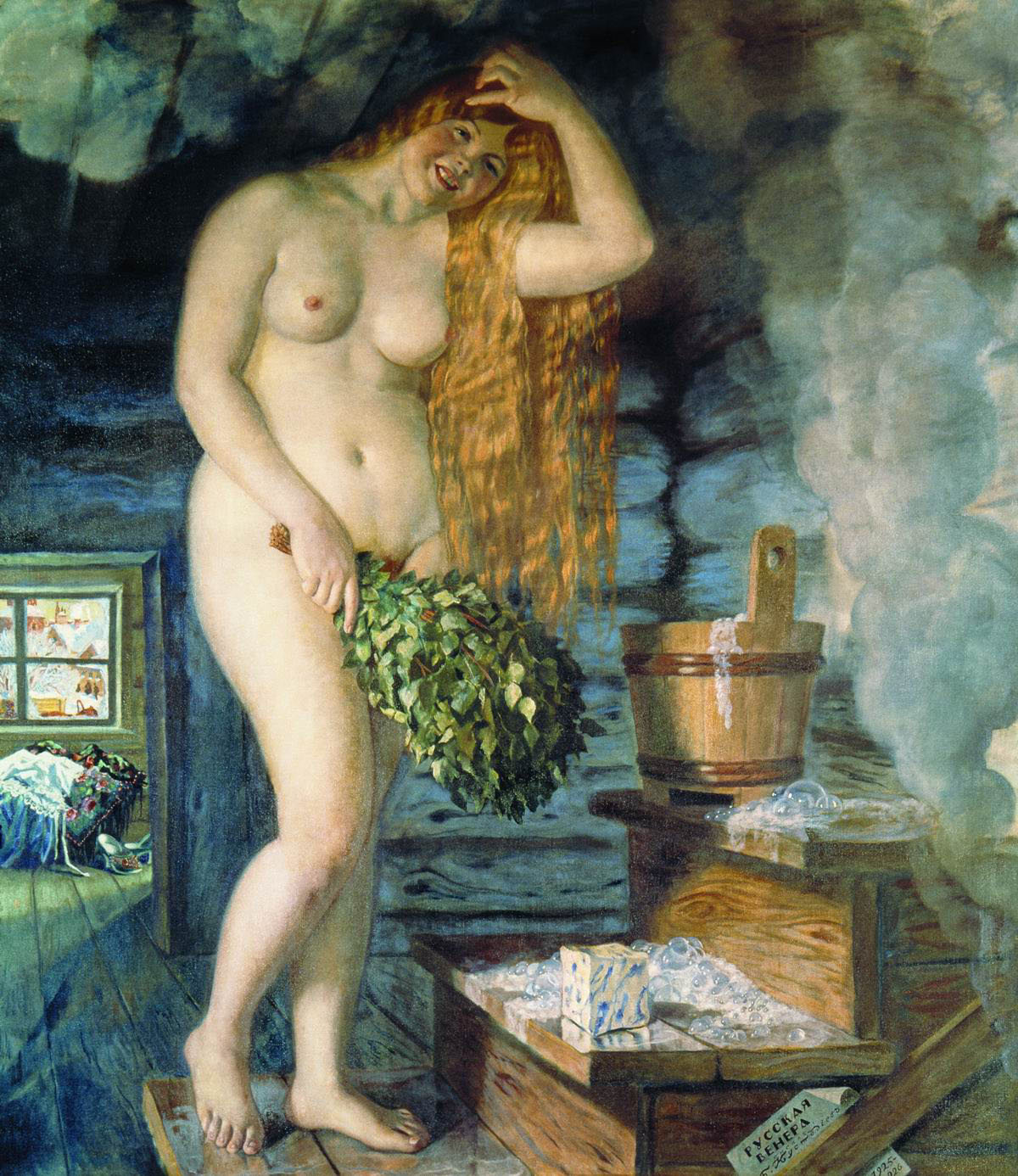
Russian Venus (1926) by Boris Kustodiev

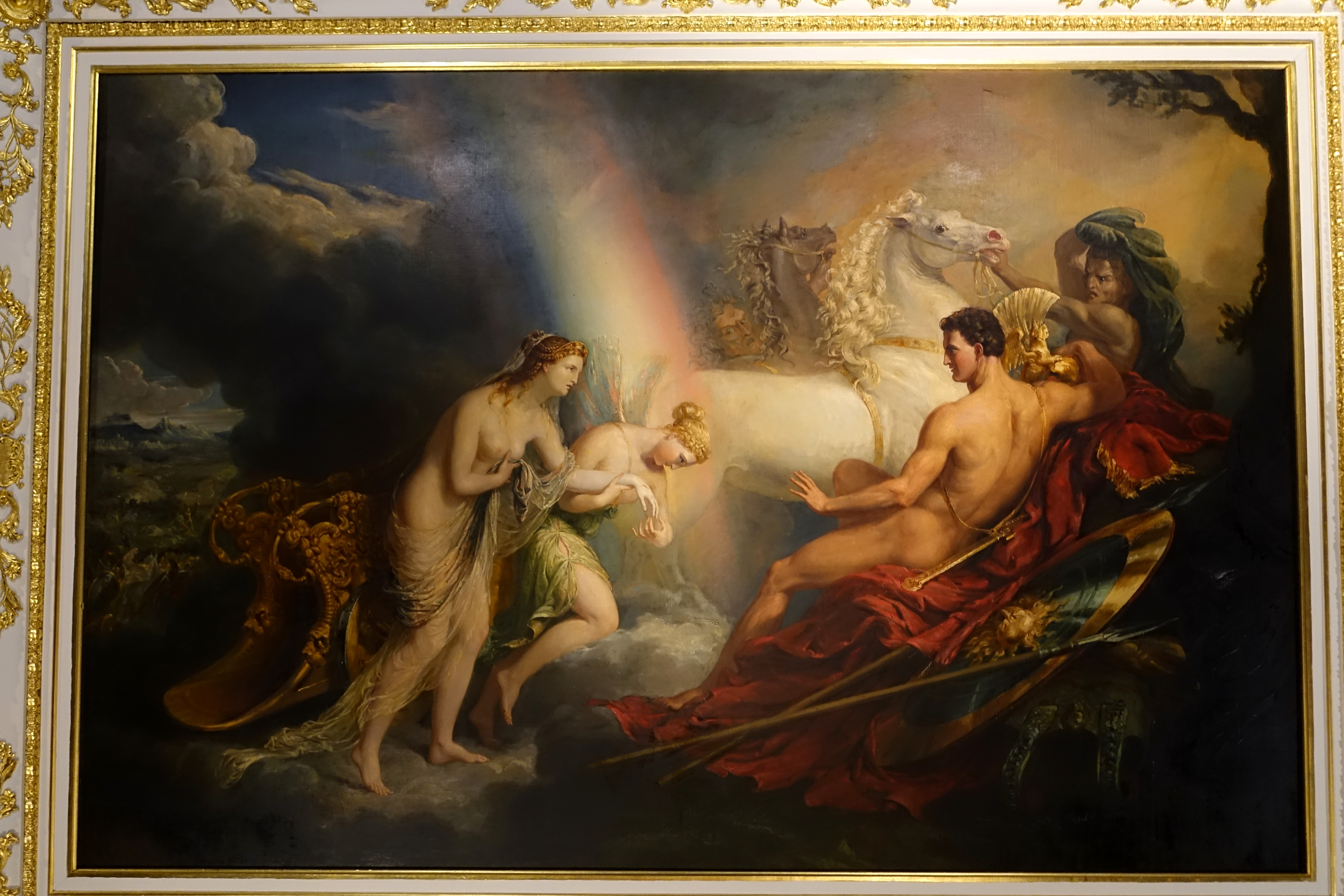
Iris presenting the wounded Venus to Mars by Sir George Hayter, 1820 – Ante Library, Chatsworth House

Anonymous (France) after François Boucher, "Venus and Cupid on a Dolphin", 19th century, lithograph

== See also ==
- Venus in nude art history
- Love goddess
- Cleft of Venus
- Dimples of Venus
- Astrological planet Venus
- Hottentot Venus
- Sailor Venus
- Benzaiten
- Anahita
- Planet Venus in the Solar System
- Venus symbol
- Venus (1929 film)
