= Velabrum =

Historical place in Rome

Coordinates: 41.8892°N 12.4819°E

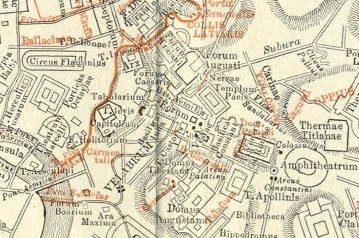
Plan showing the area of the Velabrum

The Velabrum (Classical Latin: [weː.laː.brũ]) is the low valley in the city of Rome that connects the Forum with the Forum Boarium, and the Capitoline Hill with the western slope of the Palatine Hill. The outer boundaries of the area are not themselves clear. Roman etymologies of the name are confused, with attempts to connect it to the Latin words vehere (conveyance) and velum (cloth): Varro, Propertius, and Tibullus claimed that it was the location of a ferry; Plutarch, however, claimed the name derived from the awnings placed over the Circus Maximus during games. The name may also translate to "place of mud".

It was believed that before the construction of the Cloaca Maxima, which probably follows the course of an ancient stream called Spinon, the area was a swamp, though this claim has been disproven by core samples taken from Velabrum in 1994. Varro claims there are two velabra, one maius and one minus, with the smaller emerging from the drainage of a swamp close to the northern side of the Forum: if there was any drainage the distinction between the two was largely forgotten by the last century BC when it was referred to in the plural for both. Ancient authorities state that in this marshy area, the roots of a fig tree (Ficus Ruminalis) caught and stopped the basket carrying Romulus and Remus as it floated along on the Tiber current. The place therefore has a high symbolic significance.

It was also used as a marketplace and a centre of commerce, connecting the Palatine with the two major fora. Plautus (Captivi 489) mentions it as a place where oil-sellers were found, and a scholiast (ancient commentator) on Horace (Satires 2.3.229) states: "Velabrum is a place in Rome where everything connected with food and delicacies was on sale."

Even after the Cloaca was built, the area was still prone to flooding from the Tiber, until the ground level was raised after the Neronian fire.

Within it were the tomb of Acca Larentia along with a small temple to Felicitas. It is also the site of the Arch of Janus, the Arcus Argentariorum and the church San Giorgio al Velabro.

== Bibliography ==
- Richardson, L (1992). "Velabrum Maius". A new topographical dictionary of ancient Rome. Johns Hopkins University Press. pp. 406–7. ISBN 978-0-8018-4300-6.
- Höcker, C (2006). "Velabrum". Brill's New Pauly. Brill. doi:10.1163/1574-9347_bnp_e1229240.
