= List of Roman agricultural deities =

In ancient Roman religion, agricultural deities were thought to care for every aspect of growing, harvesting, and storing crops. Preeminent among these are such major deities as Ceres and Saturn, but a large number of the many Roman deities known by name either supported farming or were devoted solely to a specific agricultural function.

From 272 to 264 BC, four temples were dedicated separately to the agricultural deities Consus, Tellus, Pales, and Vortumnus. The establishment of four such temples within a period of eight years indicates a high degree of concern for stabilizing and developing the productivity of Italy following the Pyrrhic War.

== Varro, De re rustica ==
At the beginning of his treatise on farming, Varro gives a list of twelve deities who are vital to agriculture. These make up a conceptual or theological grouping, and are not known to have received cult collectively. They are:

- Jupiter-Tellus
- Sol-Luna
- Ceres-Liber
- Robigus-Flora
- Minerva-Venus
- Lympha-Bonus Eventus

== Vergil, Georgics ==
In his Georgics, a collection of poetry on agrarian themes, Vergil gives a list influenced by literary Hellenization and Augustan ideology:

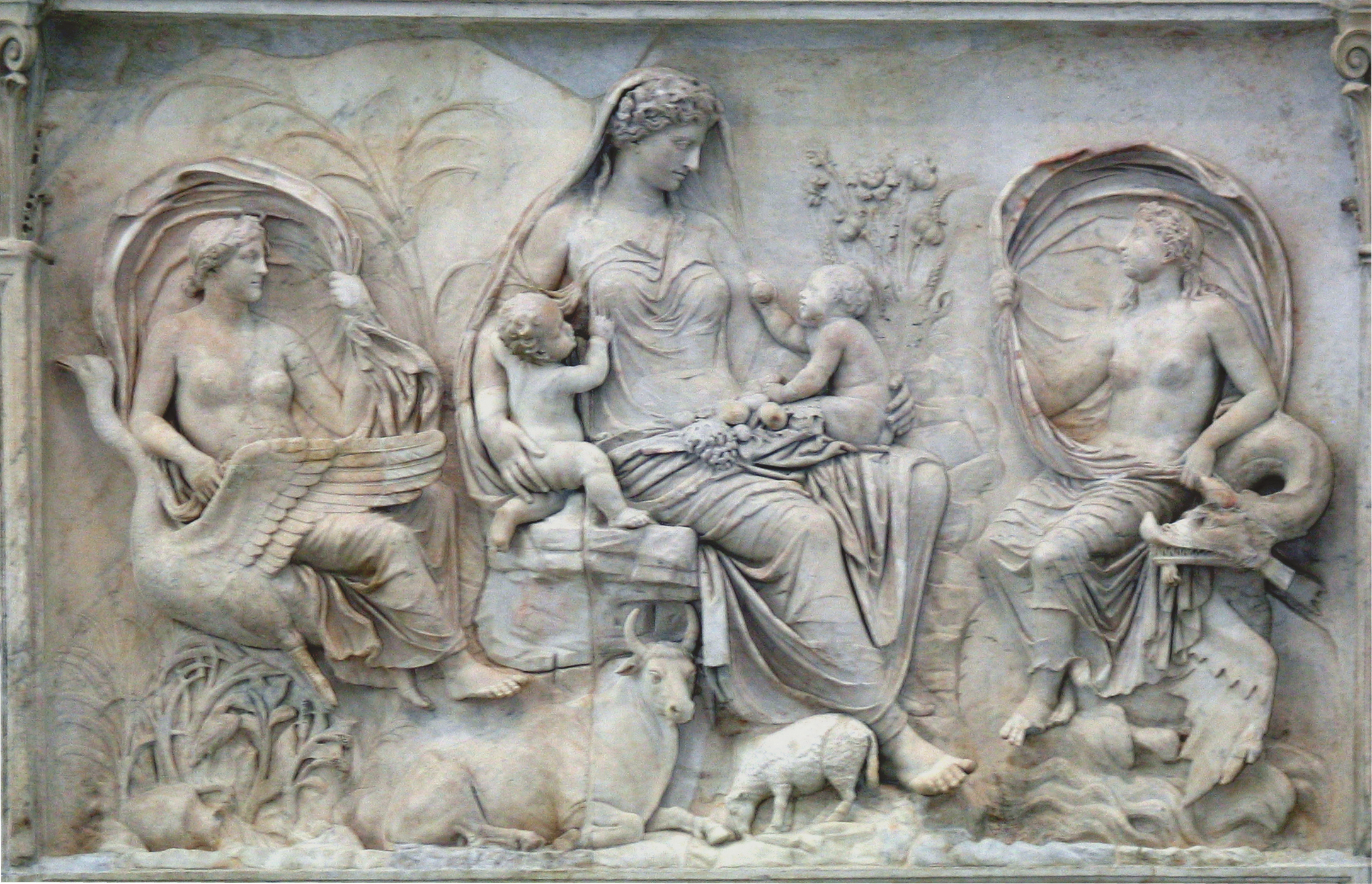
Allegorical scene with Roman deities from the Augustan Altar of Peace

- Sol-Luna
- Liber-Ceres
- Fauni-Dryads
- Neptune
- Aristaeus
- Pan-Minerva
- Triptolemus
- Silvanus

The poet proposes that the divus Julius Caesar be added as a thirteenth.

== Indigitamenta ==
=== Ceres' helper gods ===
Twelve specialized gods known only by name are invoked for the "cereal rite" (sacrum cereale) in honor of Ceres and Tellus. The twelve are all male, with names formed from the agent suffix -tor. Although their gender indicates that they are not aspects of the two goddesses who were the main recipients of the sacrum, their names are "mere appellatives" for verbal functions. The rite was held just before the Feriae Sementivae. W.H. Roscher lists these deities among the indigitamenta, lists of names kept by the pontiffs for invoking specific divine functions.

- Vervactor, "He who ploughs"
- Reparator, "He who prepares the earth"
- Imporcitor, "He who ploughs with a wide furrow"
- Insitor, "He who plants seeds"
- Obarator, "He who traces the first ploughing"
- Occator, "He who harrows"
- Serritor, "He who digs"
- Subruncinator, "He who weeds"
- Messor, "He who reaps"
- Conuector (Convector), "He who carries the grain"
- Conditor, "He who stores the grain"
- Promitor, "He who distributes the grain"

=== Other indigitamenta ===
The names of other specialized agricultural gods are preserved in scattered sources.

- Rusina is a goddess of the fields (from Latin rus, ruris; cf. English "rural" and "rustic").
- Rusor is invoked with Altor by the pontiffs in a sacrifice to the earth deities Tellus and Tellumo. In interpreting the god's function, Varro derives Rusor from rursus, "again," because of the cyclical nature of agriculture. As a matter of linguistics, the name is likely to derive from either the root ru-, as in Rumina, the breastfeeding goddess (perhaps from ruma, "teat"), or rus, ruris as the male counterpart of Rusina. Altor is an agent god from the verb alo, alere, altus, "to grow, nurture, nourish". According to Varro, he received res divina because "all things which are born are nourished from the earth".
- Sator (from the same root as Insitor above), the "sower" god.
- Seia, goddess who protects the seed once sown in the earth; also as Fructesea, compounded with fructus, "produce, fruit"
- Segesta, goddess who promotes the growth of the seedling.
- Hostilina, goddess who makes grain grow evenly.
- Lactans or Lacturnus, god who infuses crops with "milk" (sap or juice).
- Volutina, goddess who induces "envelopes" (involumenta) or leaf sheaths to form.
- Nodutus, god who causes the "knot" (Latin nodus) or node to form.
- Patelana (Patelena, Patella), goddess who opens up (pateo, patere) the grain, possibly in reference to the emergence of the flag leaf.
- Runcina (as in Subruncinator above), the weeder goddess, or a goddess of mowing.
- Messia, the female equivalent of Messor the reaper, and associated with Tutelina.
- Noduterensis (compare Nodutus) or Terensis, the god of threshing
- Tutelina (also Tutulina or Tutilina), a goddess who watches over the stored grain.
- Sterquilinus (also as Sterces, Stercutus, Sterculus, Sterculinus), who manures the fields.
