= Aprilis =

Original second month of the Roman calendar

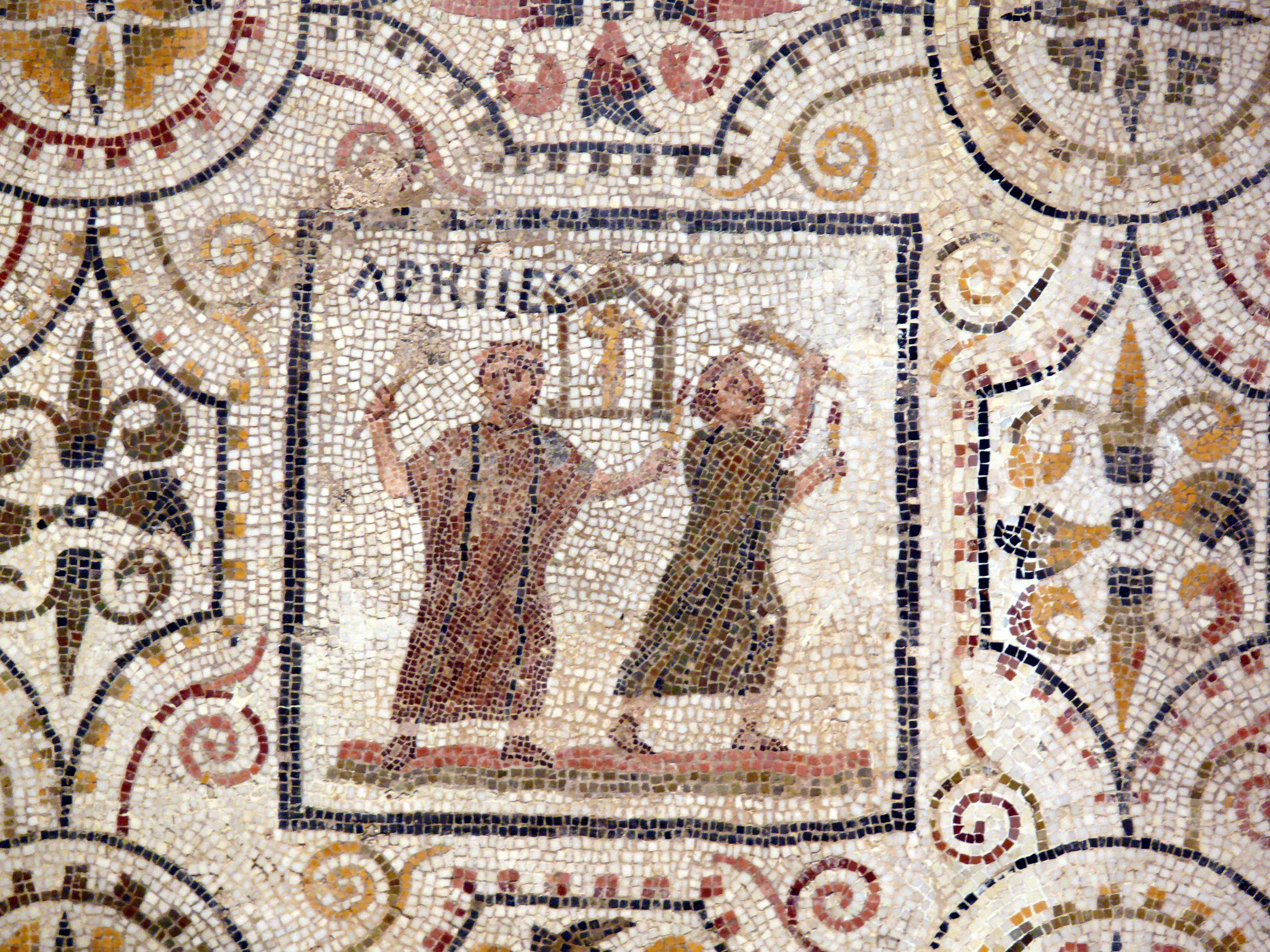
April panel from a Roman mosaic of the months (from El Djem, Tunisia, first half of 3rd century AD)

Aprilis or mensis Aprilis (April) was the second month of the classical Roman calendar, following Martius (March) and preceding Maius (May). In the oldest known Roman calendar, Aprilis had come second in a ten-month year that began with Martius, until reforms instituted a twelve-month year starting with Ianuarius (January) and Februarius (February).

April had 29 days on calendars of the Roman Republic, with a day added to the month during further reform in the mid-40s BC resulting in the Julian calendar.

April was marked by a series of festivals devoted to aspects of rural life, since it was a busy month for farmers. As Rome became more urbanized, the significance of some ceremonies expanded, notably the Parilia, an archaic pastoral festival celebrated as the "birthday" (dies natalis) or founding day of Rome. The month was generally preoccupied with deities who were female or ambiguous in gender, opening with the Feast of Venus on the Kalends.

== Name of the month ==
The Romans thought that the name Aprilis derived from aperio, aperire, apertus, a verb meaning "to open". The Fasti Praenestini offered the expanded explanation that "fruits and flowers and animals and seas and lands do open".

Some antiquarians, as well as Ovid in his poem on the Roman calendar, provide an alternate derivation from Aphrodite, the Greek counterpart of Venus whose festival began the month. Apru might be derived from the conjectured Etruscan form of the name, which would be Aprodita, but among the Etruscans, the month was called Cabreas. Some modern linguists derive Aprilis from Etruscan Ampile or Amphile, based on a medieval gloss, conjecturing an origin in the Thessalian month name Aphrios. An Indo-European origin has also been proposed, related to Sanskrit áparah and Latin alter, "the other of two", referring to its original position as the second month of the year. Varro and Cincius both reject the connection of the name to Aphrodite, and the common Roman derivation from aperio may be the correct one.

In the latter years of Nero's reign, the Roman Senate briefly renamed April Neronius in his honor.

== In the agricultural year ==
The farmers' almanacs (menologia rustica) concur that Venus—in Roman religion a goddess of gardens—was the tutelary deity of April, and that sheep were to be purified (oves lustrantur). In his agricultural treatise, Varro enumerates duties such as weeding crops, breaking ground, cutting willows, fencing meadows, and planting and pruning olives.

The second half of April brought a series of festivals pertaining to farm life:

- April 15: Fordicidia, a festival of agricultural fertility and animal husbandry;
- 21: Parilia, a feast of shepherds;
- 23: Vinalia, one of two wine festivals (the other was held August 19) in the religious year;
- 25: Robigalia to protect crops from blight.

Of these, the Fordicidia and Robigalia are likely to have been of greatest antiquity. William Warde Fowler, whose early 20th-century work on Roman festivals remains a standard reference, asserted that the Fordicidia was "beyond doubt one of the oldest sacrificial rites in Roman religion." The latter part of April was consumed by games (ludi) in honor of Ceres, the grain goddess thought to have power over growth and the life cycle. The end of the month brought the beginning of the games of Flora, goddess of blooming plants and listed by Varro as one of the twelve principal agricultural deities.

== Dates ==
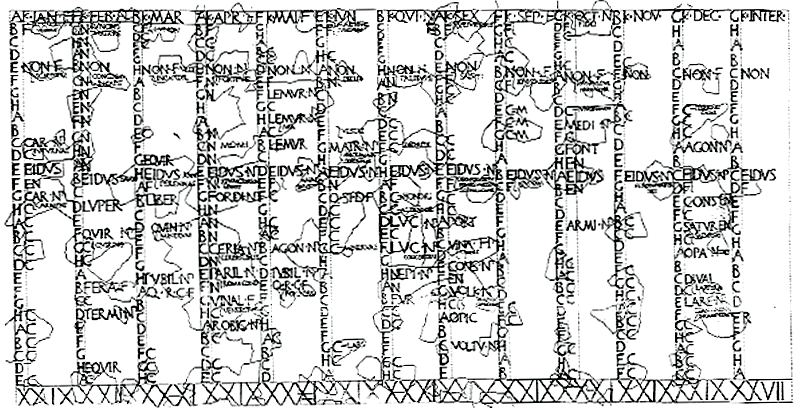
Drawing of the fragmentary Fasti Antiates, a pre-Julian calendar showing Aprilis (abbreviated APR) at the top of the fourth column

The Romans did not number days of a month sequentially from the 1st through the last day. Instead, they counted back from the three fixed points of the month: the Nones (5th or 7th), the Ides (13th or 15th), and the Kalends (1st) of the following month. The Nones of April was the 5th, and the Ides the 13th. The last day of April was the pridie Kalendas Maias, "day before the Kalends of May". Roman counting was inclusive; April 9 was ante diem V Idūs Aprilis, "the 5th day before the Ides of April," usually abbreviated a.d. V Id. Apr. (or with the a.d. omitted altogether); April 23 was IX Kal. Mai., "the 9th day before the Kalends of May," on the Julian calendar (VIII Kal. Mai. on the pre-Julian calendar).

On the calendar of the Roman Republic and early Principate, each day was marked with a letter to denote its religiously lawful status. In April, these were:

- F for dies fasti, days when it was legal to initiate action in the courts of civil law;
- C, for dies comitalis, a day on which the Roman people could hold assemblies (comitia), elections, and certain kinds of judicial proceedings;
- N for dies nefasti, when these political activities and the administration of justice were prohibited;
- NP, the meaning of which remains elusive, but which marked feriae, public holidays;

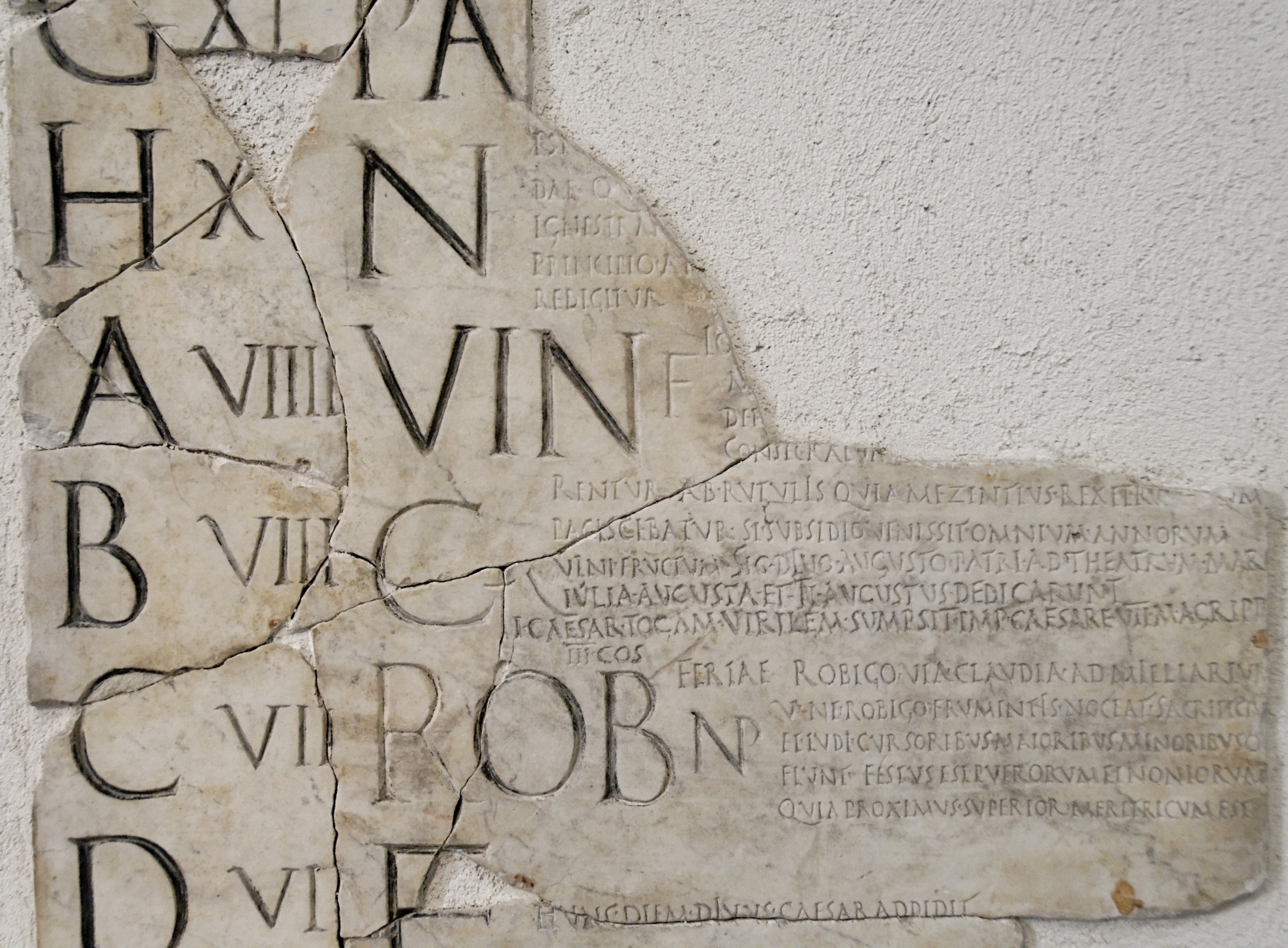
A fragment of the Fasti Praenestini for April showing the abbreviations for the Vinalia and Robigalia (VIN and ROB), and the nundinal letters on the left edge

By the late 2nd century AD, extant calendars no longer show days marked with these letters, probably in part as a result of calendar reforms undertaken by Marcus Aurelius. Days were also marked with nundinal letters in cycles of A B C D E F G H, to mark the "market week" (these are omitted in the table below).

A dies natalis was an anniversary such as a temple founding or rededication, sometimes thought of as the "birthday" of a deity. During the Imperial period, some of the traditional festivals localized at Rome became less important, and the birthdays and anniversaries of the emperor and his family gained prominence as Roman holidays. On the calendar of military religious observances known as the Feriale Duranum, sacrifices pertaining to Imperial cult outnumber the older festivals. After the mid-1st century AD, a number of dates are added to calendars for spectacles and games (ludi) held in honor of various deities in the venue called a "circus" (ludi circenses). Festivals marked in large letters on extant fasti, represented by festival names in all capital letters on the table, are thought to have been the most ancient holidays, becoming part of the calendar before 509 BC.

Unless otherwise noted, the dating and observances on the following table are from H.H. Scullard, Festivals and Ceremonies of the Roman Republic (Cornell University Press, 1981), pp. 96–115. After the Ides, dates for the Julian calendar are given; the pre-Julian date for festivals, when April had one less day, are noted parenthetically.

Modern date	Roman date	status	Observances
April 1	Kalendae Aprilis	F	• Veneralia for Venus and Fortuna Virilis
2	a.d. IV Non. Apr.	F	
3	III Non. Apr.	C	• dies natalis for the Temple of Quirinus, with circus games (after mid-1st century AD)
4	pridie Nonas Aprilis (abbrev. prid. Non. Apr.)	C	* Ludi Megalenses ("Games for the Great Mother") begin
5	Nonae Aprilis	N	• dies natalis of the Temple of Fortuna Publica • Ludi Megalenses continue
6	VIII Id. Apr.	N	• Ludi Megalenses continue
7	VII Id. Apr.	N	• Ludi Megalenses continue
8	VI Id. Apr.	N	• dies natalis for the Temple of Castor and Pollux (after mid-1st century AD) • Ludi Megalenses continue
9	V Id. Apr.	N	• Ludi Megalenses continue
10	IV Id. Apr.	N	• dies natalis of the Temple of the Great Idaean Mother on the Palatine Hill; Ludi Megalenses conclude
11	III Id. Apr.	N	• dies natalis of the deified Septimius Severus, with circus games
12	pridie Idūs Aprilis (abbrev. prid. Id. Apr.)'	N	• Ludi Cereri ("Games for Ceres") begin
13	Idūs Aprilis	NP	• monthly Feriae Iovis, a procession and sacrifice of a ram to Jove (Jupiter) on the arx • dies natalis of the Temple to Jupiter Victor and the Temple to Jove the Liberator • Ludi Cerei continue
14	XVIII Kal. Mai.	N	• Ludi Cerei continue • supplication to Victoria Augusta to commemorate the first victory achieved by Augustus (on the Feriale Cumanum, 4–14 AD)
15	XVII Kal. Mai.	NP	• Fordicidia (XVI Kal. Mai. on the pre-Julian calendar) • Ludi Cerei continue
16	XVI Kal. Mai.	N	• Ludi Cerei continue • supplication to Felicitas Imperii to commemorate the day Augustus was first named imperator (Feriale Cumanum)
17	XV Kal. Mai.	N	• Ludi Cerei continue
18	XIV Kal. Mai.	N	• Ludi Cerei continue
19	XIII Kal. Mai.	NP	• Cerealia in honor of Ceres, Liber and Libera (XII Kal. Mai. on the pre-Julian calendar); Ludi Cerei conclude
20	XII Kal. Mai.	N	
21	XI Kal. Mai.	NP	• Parilia (X Kal. Mai. on the pre-Julian calendar) • Roma condita, celebrated with circus games after the mid-1st century AD
22	X Kal. Mai.	N	
23	IX Kal. Mai.	F	• Vinalia in honor of Venus Erycina (VIII Kal. Mai. on the pre-Julian calendar)
24	VIII Kal. Mai.	C	
25	VII Kal. Mai.	NP	• Robigalia (VI Kal. Mai. on the pre-Julian calendar) • Serapia, Imperial festival with origins in the 1st century AD
26	VI Kal. Mai.	C	• dies natalis of Marcus Aurelius, with circus games
27	V Kal. Mai.	C	
28	IV Kal. Mai.	C	• Ludi Florae, beginning of the Games of Flora (April 27 on the pre-Julian calendar)
29	III Kal. Mai.	C	
30	prid. Kal. Mai.	C	
