= The Feast of Venus (Rubens) =

Painting by Peter Paul Rubens

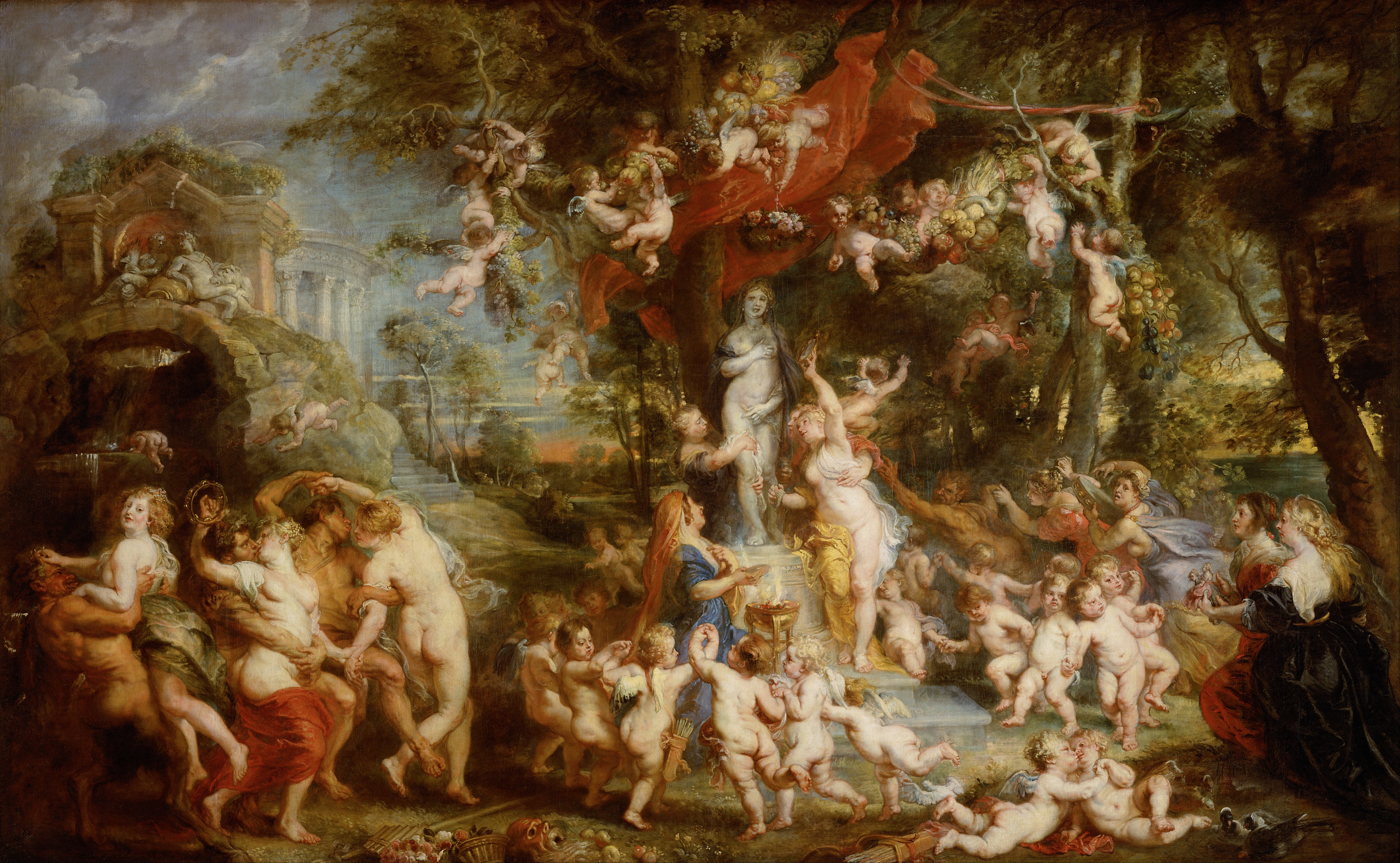
- Artist: Peter Paul Rubens
- Year: 1635-1636
- Type: Oil on canvas
- Dimensions: 217 cm × 350 cm (85 in × 140 in)
- Location: Kunsthistorisches Museum, Vienna

The Feast of Venus is an oil on canvas painting by Flemish painter Peter Paul Rubens, created in 1635–1636, now in the Kunsthistorisches Museum in Vienna. It is a fanciful depiction of the Roman festival Veneralia celebrated in honor of Venus Verticordia.

== Influences ==
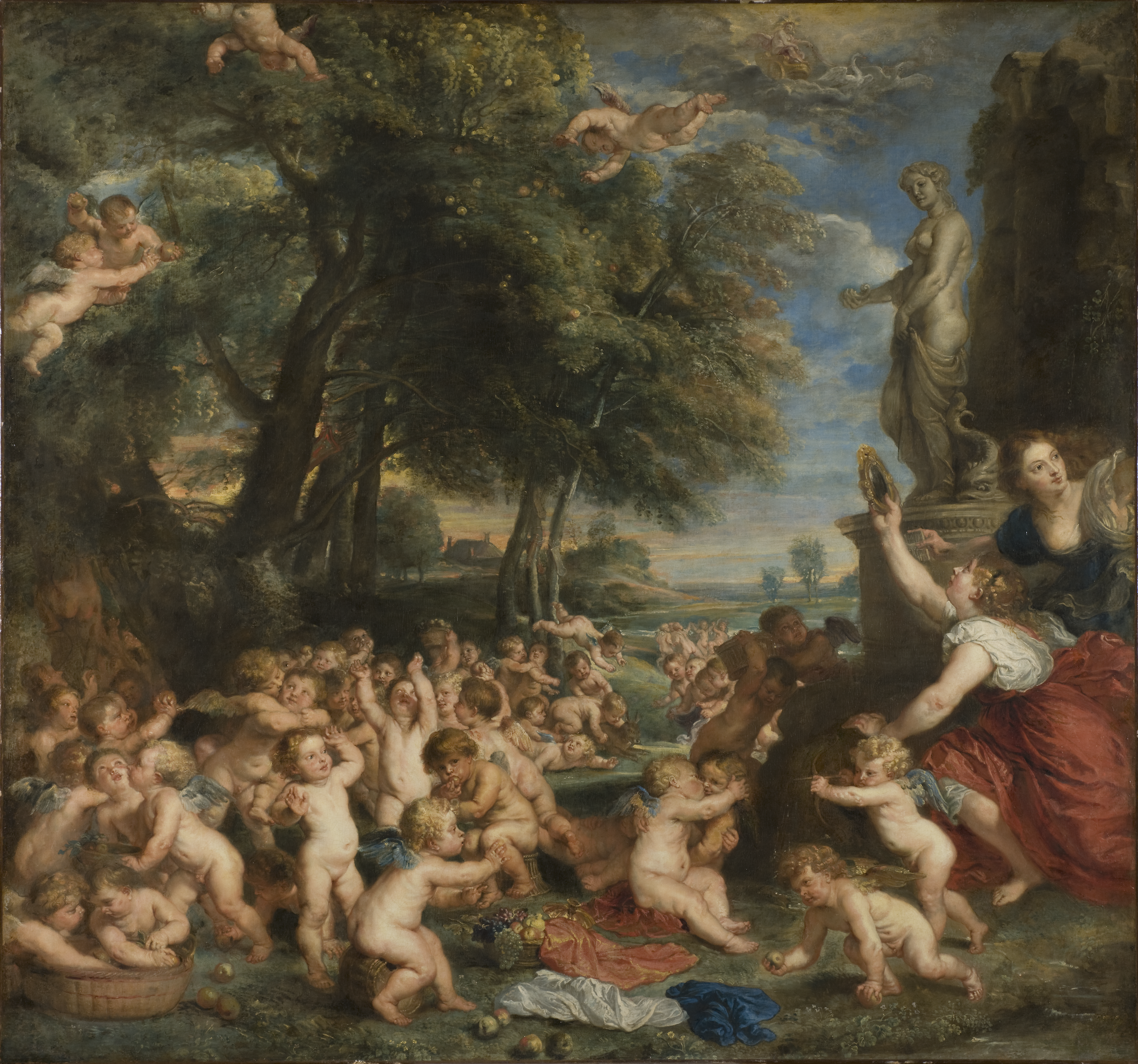
Rubens. The Worship of Venus (after Titian). c. 1630s. Nationalmuseum, Stockholm.

=== Titian and Philostratus ===
Rubens thought highly of Titian and made a copy of the Venetian master's The Worship of Venus which remained in Rubens' private collection until his death. Titian's work, in turn, was based on the Imagines of the sophist Philostratus of Lemnos. The Imagines consisted of a series of descriptions of ancient paintings presumably decorating a third-century villa near Naples. In the description entitled Cupids (Erotes), Philostratus portrays a "swarm" of cupids in a fragrant garden gathering apples, kissing the apples and throwing them back and forth, engaging in archery using themselves as targets since the arrows are arrows of love, wrestling, and chasing a hare (a symbol of fertility). While the cupids are cavorting, nymphs are attending to a statue of Venus that is garnished with a silver mirror, gilded sandals, and golden brooches. Both Titian and Rubens in his copy depict most of this activity in great detail.

=== Ovid ===
The fourth book (April) of Ovid's Fasti also served as inspiration for Rubens' The Feast of Venus. A portion of the poem describes a women's festival held on April 1 to honor both Venus Verticordia and Fortuna Virilis. Per Ovid, the festival includes the washing and decoration of a statue of Venus, ritual bathing under boughs of myrtle, and offerings of incense to Fortuna Virilis so that the goddess may hide physical blemishes from the eyes of men. The work, not always corroborated by other sources, portrays a somewhat conflicted account of the festival that blurs distinctions between class and the rite's purpose. Primarily, the cult was intended to turn a woman's heart from lust (libidine) to chastity (pudicitia) so that she may retain her "beauty, virtue and good repute." However, in addition to brides and mothers, Ovid includes "you who must not wear the headbands and long robes". This is a euphemistic reference to prostitutes (meretrices) who were not allowed to wear the hairstyle and clothes of a respectable matron. Instead, they wore a short tunic and toga. Prostitutes were not being asked to embrace chastity, so their participation must have served other purposes.

== Composition ==
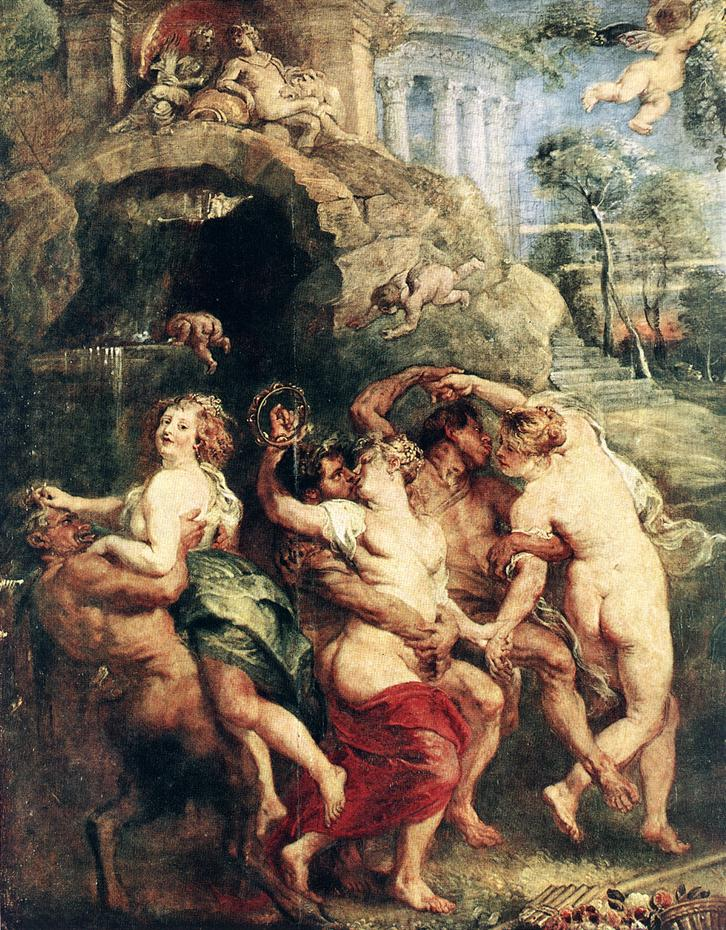
Detail of dancing nymphs and satyrs. The nymph on the far left was modeled by Rubens' wife Helena.

Rubens combined key elements of Imagines and Fasti along with details of his own invention to create a spirited allegory of conjugal bliss where "voluptuous sensuality is joined and enhanced by the propriety of marriage."

A statue of Venus Verticordia in a pudica pose is the focal point of the work. She is surrounded by attendants who, in turn, are encircled by dancing and cavorting cupids, satyrs, nymphs, and maenads. Rubens includes all three of Ovid's classes of women in his work. The well-clothed matrons are shown performing rites. One washes the statue while the other, in an attitude of prayer, offers incense from a flaming tripod to Fortuna Virilis. The sea of dancing cupids has momentarily parted to allow two eager brides bearing dolls as offerings to rush to the goddess. The prostitutes are also present. Naked except for fluttering draperies, they stand at the foot of Venus. One clutches a comb while holding up a mirror so that the goddess can view herself. The temple of Venus is shown in the background behind a grotto in which a stream of water cascades into an overflowing basin. Rubens does not depict any of the celebrants ritually bathing as described by Ovid, but the basin in the grotto alludes to that practice.

Rubens, like Titian, filled his canvas with a swarm of frisky cupids. Rubens applied his own distinct details to the amoretti, however. Some of them are depicted as females without wings. Art historian Philipp Fehl has postulated the amorous couple in the right foreground accompanied by two pairs of doves represents Cupid and Psyche, highlighting how marriage enriches love. Another winged cupid lowers a wreath of roses over the head of Venus in accordance with Ovid: "Now she’s given fresh flowers, and new-sprung roses." The remainder of the cupids who are not dancing are collecting the apples of Venus as described by Philostratus as well as sheaves of wheat and clusters of grapes. The wheat and grapes are attributes of Ceres and Bacchus respectively and the gods they represent are shown as seated statues over the grotto. This detail adds to the lustful nature of Rubens' portrayal since a well-known adage immortalized in a play by Terence states: sine Cerere et Baccho friget Venus (without food and wine, love grows cold).

The frolicking nymphs and satyrs in front of the grotto are a bacchanalian representation of pure erotic desire. Rubens used his young wife Helena Fourment as the model for the nymph on the far left. She is being held aloft by a leering satyr as she lewdly clutches his horns and stares out of the canvas with a knowing look.
