= Secia =

Secia may refer to:

- an alternative name for Secchia, a river in Italy
- a harvesting goddess associated with Tutelina
