= Prostitution in ancient Rome =

Aspect of ancient Roman society

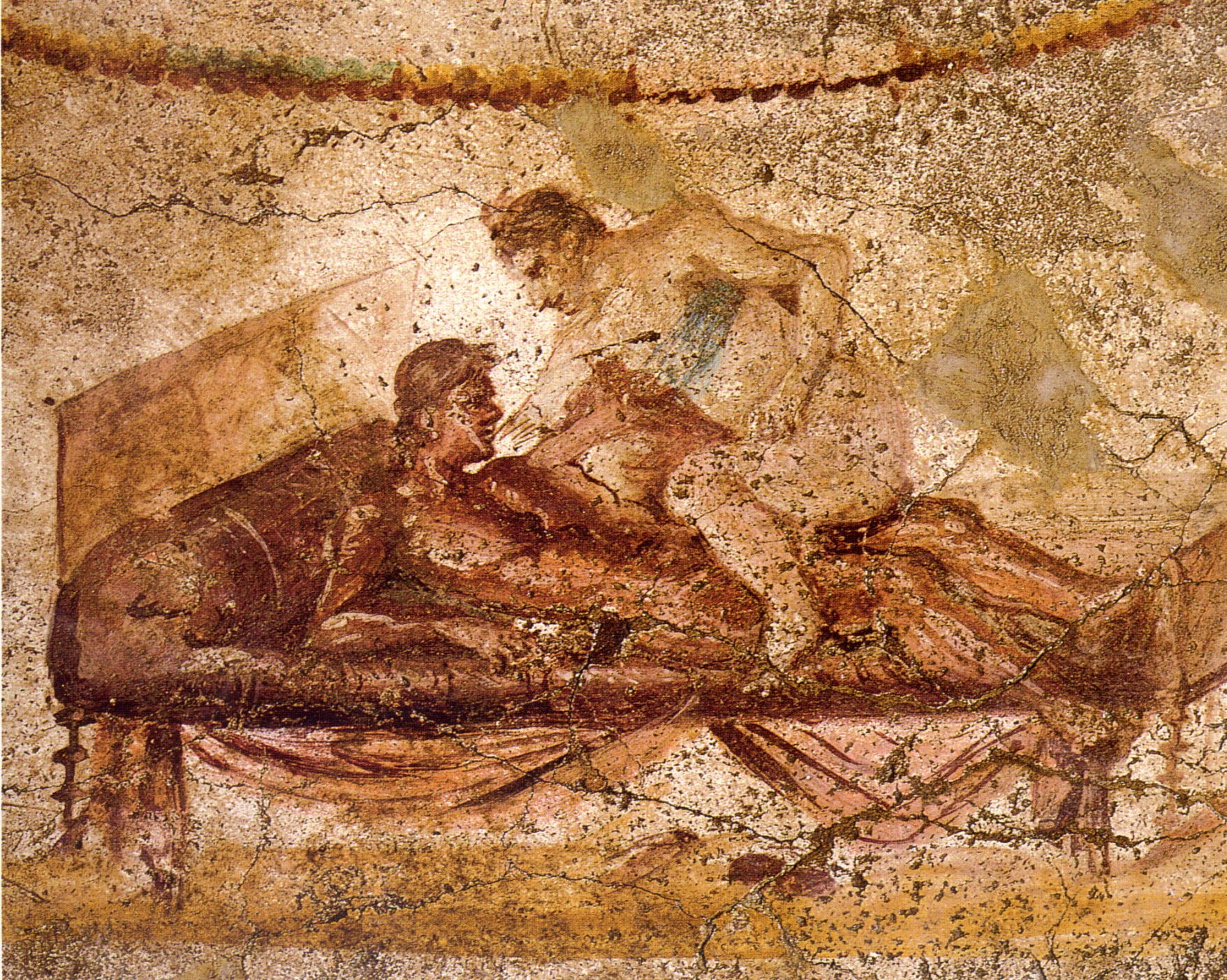
Wall painting from the Lupanar (brothel) of Pompeii, with the woman presumed to be a prostitute

Prostitution in ancient Rome was legal and licensed. The moral stance of Roman society towards it is a complex topic and there are indications that it evolved through time.

Prostitution took many forms. It ranged from the sexual services that were routinely offered in many establishments - such as Roman baths (thermae) or inns (tabernae and stabula) - to the dedicated brothels (lupanar). Most prostitutes were female slaves or freedwomen. The balance of voluntary to forced prostitution can only be guessed at. Privately held slaves were considered property under Roman law, so it was legal for an owner to employ them as prostitutes. Pimping and prostitution were, however, considered disgraceful and dishonourable activities, and their practitioners were considered “infamous” (infames); for citizens, this meant loss of reputation and many of the rights and privileges attached to citizenship. Slave-owning patrons and investors may have sought to avoid loss of privilege by appointing slaves or freedmen to manage their clandestine investments. Some large brothels in the 4th century, when Rome was becoming officially Christianized, seem to have been counted as tourist attractions and were possibly state-owned.

Latin literature makes frequent reference to prostitutes. Historians such as Livy and Tacitus mention prostitutes who had acquired some degree of respectability through patriotic, law-abiding, or euergetic behavior. The high-class "call girl" (meretrix) is a stock character in Plautus's comedies, which were influenced by Greek models. The poems of Catullus, Horace, Ovid, Martial, and Juvenal, as well the Satyricon of Petronius, offer fictional or satiric glimpses of prostitutes. Real-world practices are documented by provisions of Roman law that regulate prostitution, and by inscriptions, especially graffiti from Pompeii. Erotic art in Pompeii and Herculaneum from sites presumed to be brothels has also contributed to scholarly views on prostitution.

== Moral stance on prostitution ==
There were social settings in which men of any social status were free to engage prostitutes of either sex without incurring moral disapproval, as long as they demonstrated self-control and moderation in the frequency and enjoyment of sex. Brothels were part of the culture of ancient Rome, as popular places of entertainment for Roman men. Sexual services were routinely offered by the slave attendants in Roman baths (thermae) where both male and female patrons were serviced by both male and female attendants .

There are also signs that there were social settings in which prostitution was shunned. Men coming out from a brothel would typically cover their heads to hide their faces. Cicero explicitly mentions having recognised an opponent exiting a poppina with his head covered, indicating that he had used the services of a prostitute. The practice was so common that the expression "covering one's head like when coming out of a brothel" is used in literary works in unrelated contexts . A joke preserved in the Satyricon plays on the double meaning of the word stabulum - cheap housing or a brothel - and clearly mocks the intelligence of men who spend their money on prostitutes .

There is also evidence that the Roman sexual morals evolved during the era. They tended to view the earlier Greeks as being of somewhat loose morals. The conversion to Christianity during the late Roman Empire also played a very significant role, although the change was linear and happened over many centuries . It is not clear to which point Christianity was a driving factor and to which point the emerging Christianity itself was shaped by this gradual change in the Roman society.

== The prostitutes ==
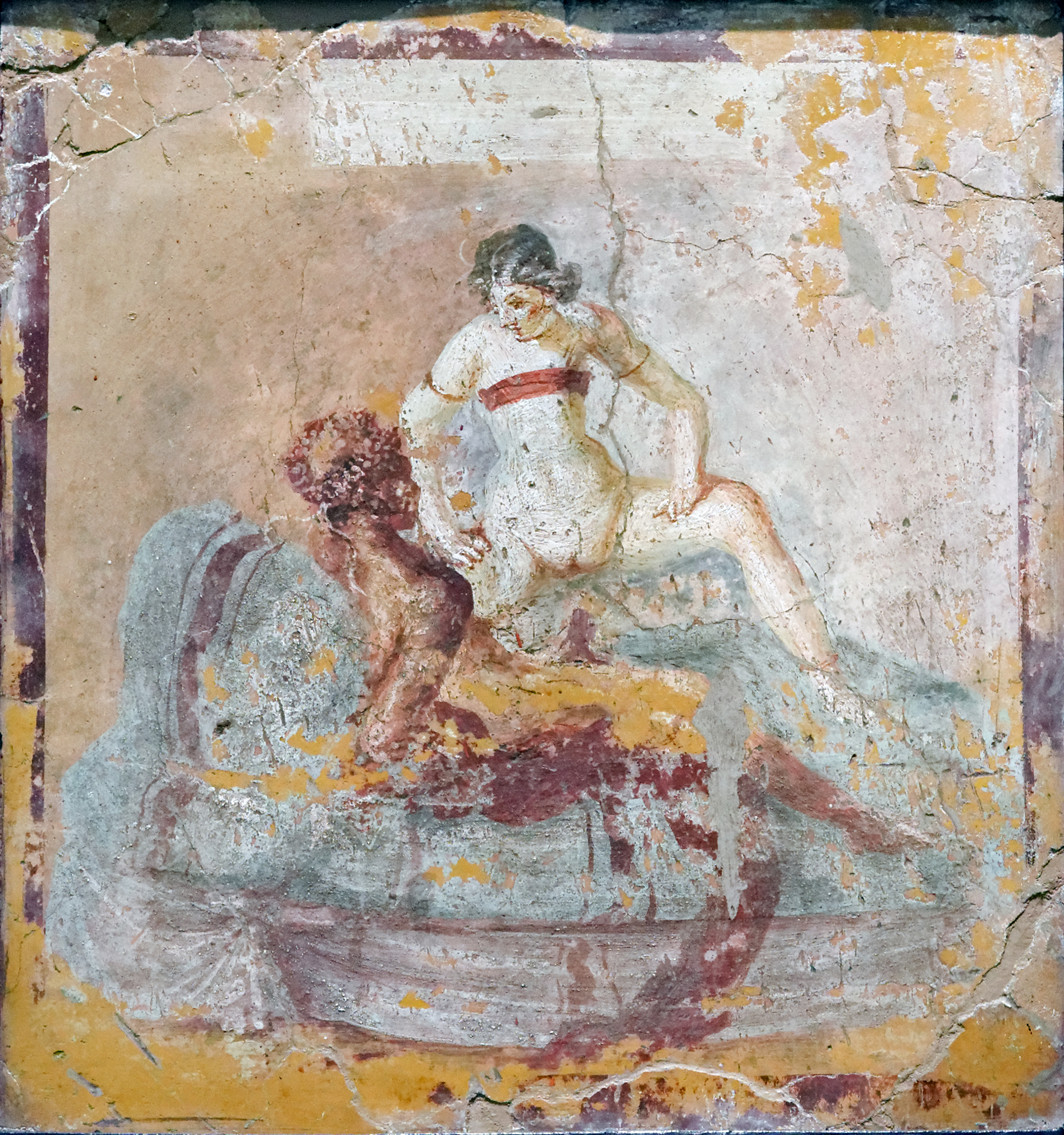
An erotic scene from a fresco of Pompeii, 1–50 AD, Secret Museum, Naples

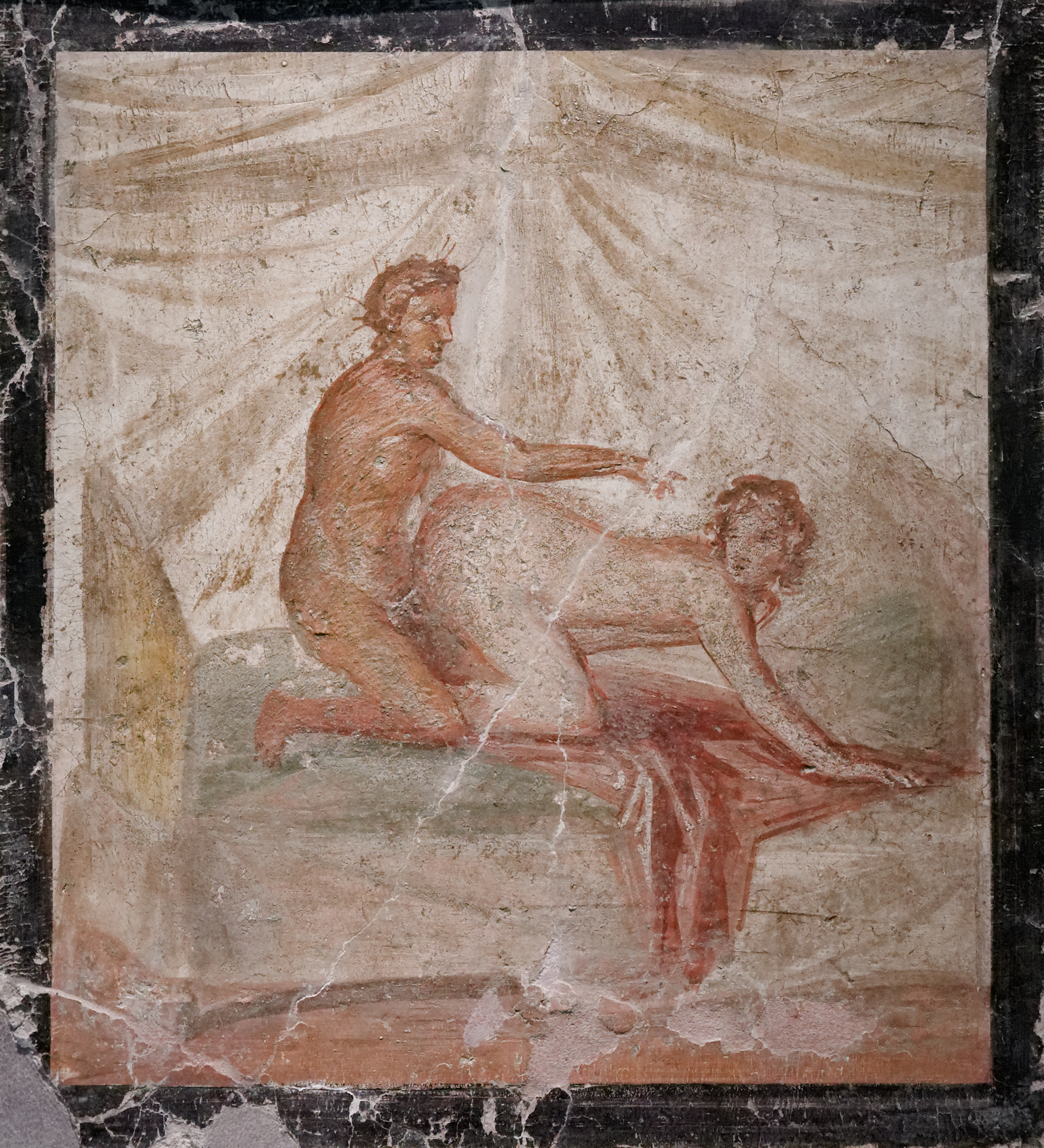
An erotic scene from a fresco of Pompeii, 50–79 AD

=== Terminology ===
Most scholarship on Roman prostitution implies a social hierarchy, whereby meretrix ("woman who earns, paid woman") is a free-born, higher-class registered prostitute, scortum (possibly from "hides, leather") is an impoverished low-class street-walker, and amica a purely euphemistic "lady-friend". Witzke offers examples from Roman comedies to show that all these terms may be used to refer to the same individual, a hierarchy of politeness, with meretrix the most respectful, but equally used for a brothel slave worker and a high-class free prostitute. Scortum is an insult in some circumstances but affectionate banter in others, and amica is euphemistic, used in Roman comedies by naïve adolescent clients to downplay the commercial basis of their relationship. There are no low-class street prostitutes in Roman comedies.

In most modern scholarship, meretrix (plural: meretrices) is taken to be the standard term for a registered female prostitute, a higher class of sex worker — the more pejorative scortum can be used for prostitutes of either gender, with a distinctly condemnatory edge when used by Roman moralists. Unregistered or casual prostitutes fall under the broad category prostibulae, "lower class"; the relatively uncommon lupa, (from Lupus femina, "she-wolf") is rarely attested in the literature but was probably common among the lower social classes. To Adams, lupa suggests a particularly low, predatory prostitute who works from graveyards.

Although both women and men might engage male or female prostitutes, female prostitutes far outnumbered males, and evidence for female prostitution is the more ample. A stable legal definition of "prostitute" came late in Roman legal history. It defined a prostitute as someone sexually promiscuous who received payment for sex. The greater emphasis in this legal couplet was on promiscuity, not payment. Prostitutes were thought to do what they did because they had an excessive appetite for sex, and pimps (lenones) through greed for money.

=== Circumstance ===
Some prostitutes were self-employed and rented a room for work. A girl (puella, a term used in poetry as a synonym for "girlfriend" or meretrix and not necessarily an age designation) might live with a procuress or madame (lena) or even go into business under the management of her natural mother. These arrangements suggest the recourse to prostitution by free-born women in dire financial need, and such prostitutes may have been regarded as of relatively higher repute or social degree. Prostitutes could also work out of a brothel, bathhouse or tavern for a procurer or pimp (leno), who provided them with clients and protection. Some worked unescorted on the streets, or from graveyards, with virtually non-existent overheads but high risks of non-payment and assault, and no recourse to law. Ordinary women who went out unescorted were frequently mistaken for prostitutes.

Most prostitutes seem to have been slaves or former slaves. There is some evidence that slave prostitutes could retain at least a proportion of their earnings. In the Empire as a whole, and among prostitutes as a whole, prices ranged between 1 and 25 asses. This would have yielded an average daily income of 10 asses, before fees due to her pimp or brothel; about twice the income of a male day-labourer. In Pompeii, prices were between 2 and 20 asses. Exactly what services were provided for these sums is not known; nor is the status of the women involved. According to a certain Lucilius, the lowest payment – for an unspecified service – was "miniscule [sic]". For services of the highest class professionals, no upper limit is apparent: the wealth of the dictator Sulla is said to have been founded on a high class prostitute's bequest. The trope of the "generous whore" goes back to Rome's foundation myth, with Acca Larentia's gift of land to the Roman people, earned during her years as a meretrix. Historically, most meretrices earned little, compared to their pimps and owners.

Some courtesans were counted among Rome's wealthiest and most influential women. In 49 BC Cicero was scandalised to find that Pompey, although a married man, allowed his mistress Cytheris, a former slave and actress-turned-courtesan, to occupy the seat of honour reserved for the family materfamilias. In the context of Augustan poetry, Richard Frank sees Cytheris as an exemplar of the "charming, artistic and educated" women who contributed to a new romantic standard for male–female relationships that Ovid and others articulated in their erotic elegies; a welcome guest for dinner parties at the highest level of Roman society. One hundred and twenty years later, Suetonius describes an episode in which the emperor Vespasian's mistress, the capable and talented ex-slave and freedwoman Antonia Caenis, offered familial kisses of greeting to his sons. The elder son, Titus, courteously accepted. The younger, Domitian, refused and offered his hand instead. Suetonius reports this as an example of Domitian's insufferable arrogance and rudeness.

=== Infamia, registration and tax ===
Prostitutes were "infamous persons" (infames), socially disgraced by their unchaste profession. They had few rights, and little or no protection under the law. They could be subjected to physical punishment. They could not give evidence in court, and Roman freeborn men and women were forbidden to marry them; as loss of chastity was irreparable, their infamia was a life-long condition that could not be redeemed before the conversion to Christianity which held a different doctrine.

Still, there are surviving examples of at least some degree of legal protection for sex workers. There is a preserved decision by a judge to banish as a murderer a Roman senator who had killed his favourite prostitute and to confiscate a tenth of his property as a compensation to the victim's family, despite the objections of the other senators .

Most prostitutes, and pimps, were slaves or former slaves, with no social standing or reputation to lose; pimps were purveyors of human flesh and sensual pleasure. Other Infames included actors and gladiators, who exerted fascination and sexual allure; and butchers, gravediggers and executioners, polluted by their associations with blood and death. Romans assumed that actors, dancers and gladiators were available to provide paid sexual services. Courtesans named in the historical record are sometimes indistinguishable from actresses and other performers.

Professional meretrices had to register with the aediles, urban magistrates whose duties included the organisation of Ludi (public games), maintenance of the streets, shrines and public buildings, and the enforcement of public order. The several Leges Juliae were attempts by rulers of the Julian dynasty to re-establish the social primacy, population levels and dignitas of Rome's ruling classes after the chaos of civil war. New laws made the Imperial state responsible for matters traditionally managed within citizen families as iures (singular ius, a customary right). The laws penalised celibacy, promoted marriage and family life, rewarded married couples who produced many children, and punished adultery with degradation and exile. Marriage between male citizens and working or retired prostitutes was banned. The Larinum decree of Tiberius forbade the public degradation of aristocrats and their relatives to the third generation by renegade family members who sought to earn a living "with their bodies"; publicly "prostituting" themselves on stage, at the arena or in competition at the circus for applause or money. Augustus used the laws to have his daughter Julia exiled for her blatant disobedience, treason and serial adulteries; otherwise, the effects of legislation against adultery were minimal, and seemingly confined to the ruling elite.

An elite woman guilty of adultery could be made to divorce, lose a proportion of her dowry, and her status as matrona or materfamilias, and be redefined as a meretrix. A husband who failed to divorce his wife for proven adultery was held to have profited from her adultery in the manner of a pimp, and he therefore shared her disgrace and punishment; his own sexual activities were only adulterous if committed with a married woman. The father or husband of a woman caught in adultery could kill her and her partner, without penalty if done in the heat of the moment. None of these laws and edicts applied to registered prostitutes, ever-available sexual outlets for Roman males who might otherwise prey on respectable citizens or their children, male or female. Any children conceived by a prostitute could never inherit their father's estate, but a convicted and divorced adulteress willing to register and practice as a meretrix could at least partly mitigate her loss of rights, status and income.

Starting in Caligula's time, prostitutes were liable to pay a tax equal to their usual charge for a single client, whether the prostitute was active, or retired. How often this had to be paid is not known, but it was applied throughout the Empire, in some cases to the prostitute herself, in others to the brothel-owner or the pimp. At first, it was collected by publicani (professional tax collectors) but the aediles soon passed responsibility for its collection to the military, on behalf of the state – in Rome itself, this meant collection by the notoriously forceful Praetorian Guard. Permits were also issued to prostitutes, possibly in return for an extra payment, to openly ply their trade on particular festival days. As the money was deemed to be polluted, emperor Severus Alexander diverted it from the common state fund towards the upkeep of public buildings, administered by the aediles. The tax was abolished in the 4th century under the Christian emperor Theodosius.

=== Clothing and appearance ===
It was probably common throughout Rome for prostitutes to dress differently from other citizens. Some modern scholarship asserts that meretrices wore the toga when in public, through compulsion or choice; and that the same may have been imposed on adulteresses, as a public signal of their disgrace. Togas were otherwise the formal attire of citizen men, while respectable adult freeborn women and matronae might wear the stola on formal occasions; this long, body-concealing, foot-length garment was worn over a foot-length, long-sleeved tunic, and was forbidden to prostitutes and adulteresses. Scholarly opinions are divided on the matter of togate prostitutes; some take it literally, others as euphemism for an overwhelmingly self-assertive, "masculine" woman. McGinn claims that it represents the assimilation of adulterous female citizen to prostitute, as the toga is worn by both. Edwards asserts that the toga, when worn by a meretrix set her apart from respectable women, and suggested her sexual availability; Expensive courtesans wore gaudy garments of see-through silk. Bright colors – "Colores meretricii" – and jewelled anklets also marked them out from respectable women. Radicke (2002) claims that most modern interpretations are attempts to rationalise later misunderstandings of primary source material, passed on by Late Antique scholiasts. Only unfree prostitutes could be made to wear anything in particular, by their owners or pimps, including a so-called "women's toga". Radicke speculates that for convenience, lower cost and easy removal, the "woman's toga" was a toga exigua ("skimpy toga"), which would have exposed the lower leg, and parts of the torso; no respectable woman would have worn such a garment. Free prostitutes and adulteresses could wear what they wished, and neither laws nor custom dictated otherwise.

Some passages by Roman authors seem to indicate that prostitutes displayed themselves in the nude. Nudity and exposure to the public gaze were associated with slavery. A passage from Seneca describes the condition of the prostitute as a slave for sale:

Naked she stood on the shore, at the pleasure of the purchaser; every part of her body was examined and felt. Would you hear the result of the sale? The pirate sold; the pimp bought, that he might employ her as a prostitute.

In the Satyricon, Petronius's narrator relates how he "saw some men prowling stealthily between the rows of name-boards and naked prostitutes". The satirist Juvenal describes a prostitute as standing naked "with gilded nipples" at the entrance to her cell. The adjective nudus, however, can also mean "exposed" or stripped of one's outer clothing, and the erotic wall paintings of Pompeii and Herculaneum show women presumed to be prostitutes wearing the Roman equivalent of a bra even while actively engaged in sex acts.

=== Rights and restrictions ===
In most circumstances, slave prostitutes could be freely and indiscriminately bought, used and sold. Some were slaves of slave pimps. The children of slaves were property of their mother's owner, to be disposed as thought fit.

Sometimes, however, the seller of a female slave attached a ne serva prostituatur clause to the ownership papers to prevent her being forcefully prostituted once sold; if the new owner or any owner thereafter used her as a prostitute she would be freed. This may have been an attempt to conserve what honor was possible for the slave herself, or to remove any possibility of dishonour from the vendor, who might otherwise be thought to have played the part of a pimp, and contravened one of the most fundamental of Roman norms. For all social classes, a virgin girl's chastity was her most valued personal asset, not to be squandered. Under Hadrian, slaves were protected from being sold to pimps or gladiator schools "unless for good reason". Septimius Severus made protection of slaves from forced prostitution a duty of the urban praetor.

=== Male prostitution ===
The Romans opposed Roman citizens being penetrated, which they associated with effeminacy. Cato the Elder was very open about his feelings of sexuality. He, and many other Romans, thought the Greeks' idea of free sexuality was shameful. Cato did not want any Roman man to be "too feminine", as he considered this dishonourable. However, it was common for Roman men to engage in sex with males as the active partner. Relations were common in the Roman public baths, as men and women bathed separately. It is probable that male prostitution took place in these Roman bath houses as well.

There are multiple Latin terms used for a male prostitute, such as scortum (gender neutral), exoletus (specific to males over the age of 18) and amasius or catamite (used for young male prostitute).

Male prostitutes may have been given a percentage of their earnings, where female prostitutes were not. Graffiti advertisements show evidence of male prostitution in Pompeii.

The 1st-century historian Valerius Maximus presents a story of complicated sexual psychology in which a freedman had been forced by his owner to prostitute himself during his time as a slave; the freedman kills his own young daughter when she loses her virginity to her tutor.

== Brothels ==
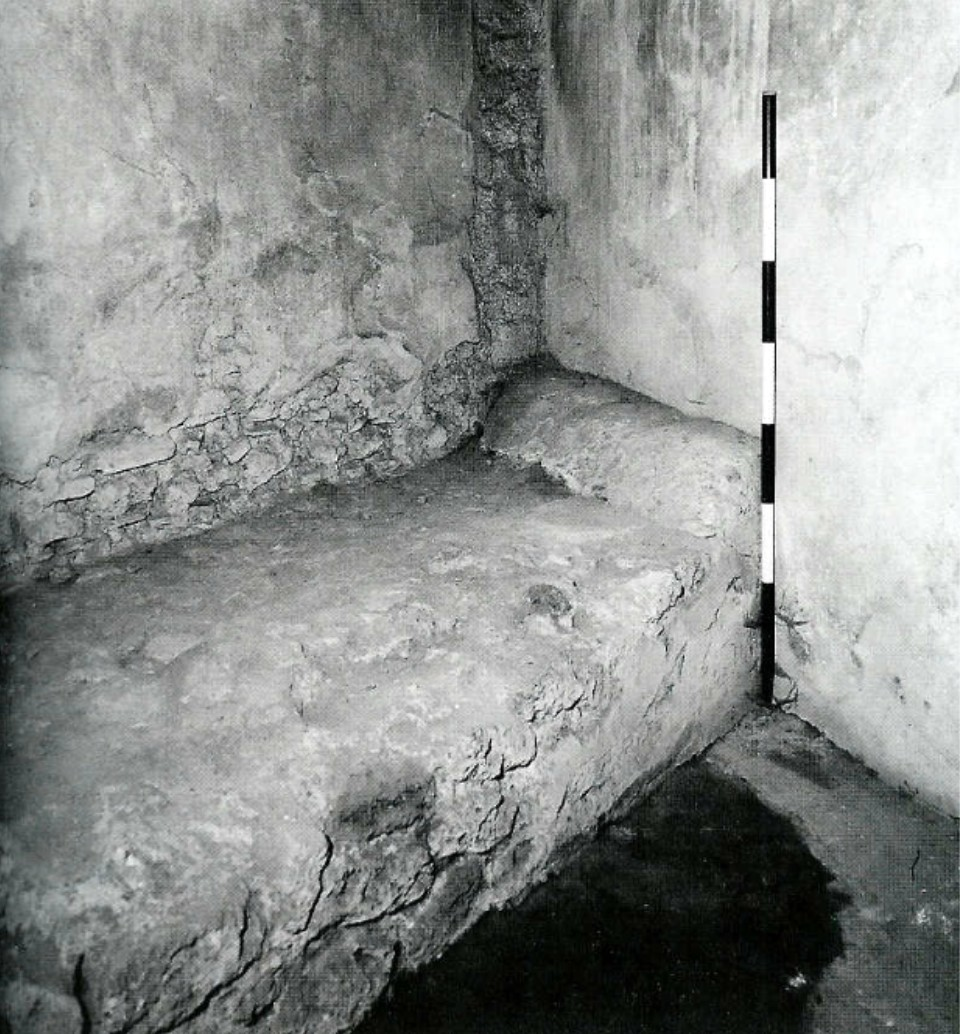
Purpose-built brothels featured cubicles with a permanent foundation for the bed, as in this example from the Lupanar at Pompeii

Roman brothels are known from literary sources, regionary lists, and archaeological evidence. Usually such a brothel is called a lupanar or lupanarium, from lupa, "she-wolf", (slang for a "common prostitute,") or fornix, a general term for a vaulted space or cellar. According to the regionaries for the city of Rome, lupanaria were concentrated in Regio II; the Caelian Hill, the Suburra that bordered the city walls, and the valley between the Caelian and Esquiline Hills.

The Great Market (macellum magnum) was in this district, along with many cook-shops, stalls, barber shops, the office of the public executioner, and the barracks for foreign soldiers quartered at Rome. Regio II was one of the busiest and most densely populated quarters in the entire city — an ideal location for the brothel owner or pimp. Rent from a brothel was a legitimate source of income.

The regular brothels are described as exceedingly dirty, smelling of characteristic odors lingering in poorly ventilated spaces and of the smoke from burning lamps, as noted accusingly by Seneca: "you reek still of the soot of the brothel". The only known remaining brothel in Pompeii, the Lupanar, exhibits how poor the living conditions were for the prostitutes.

Some brothels aspired to a loftier clientele. Hair dressers were on hand to repair the ravages wrought by frequent amorous conflicts, and water boys (aquarioli) waited by the door with bowls for washing up.

The licensed houses seem to have been of two kinds: those owned and managed by a pimp (leno) or madam (lena), and those in which the latter was merely an agent, renting rooms and acting as a supplier for his renters. In the former, the owner kept a secretary, villicus puellarum, or an overseer for the girls. This manager assigned a girl her name, fixed her prices, received the money and provided clothing and other necessities. It was also the duty of the villicus, or cashier, to keep an account of what each girl earned: "give me the brothel-keeper's accounts, the fee will suit".

The mural decoration was also in keeping with the object for which the house was maintained; see erotic art in Pompeii and Herculaneum. Over the door of each cubicle was a tablet (titulus) upon which was the name of the occupant and her price; the reverse bore the word occupata ("occupied, in service, busy") and when the inmate was engaged the tablet was turned so that this word was out. Plautus speaks of a less pretentious house when he says: "let her write on the door that she is occupata". The cubicle usually contained a lamp of bronze or, in the lower dens, of clay, a pallet or cot of some sort, over which was spread a blanket or patch-work quilt, this latter being sometimes employed as a curtain. The fees recorded at Pompeii range from 2 to 20 asses per client. By comparison, a legionary earned around 10 asses per day (225 denarii per year), and an as could buy 324 g of bread. Some brothels may have had their own token coin system, called spintria.

Because intercourse with a meretrix was almost normative for the adolescent male of the period, and permitted for the married man as long as the prostitute was properly registered, brothels were commonly dispersed around Roman cities, often found between houses of respected families. These included both large brothels and one-room cellae meretriciae, or "prostitute's cots". Roman authors often made distinctions between "good faith" meretrices who truly loved their clients, and "bad faith" prostitutes, who only lured them in for their money.

== Other locations ==
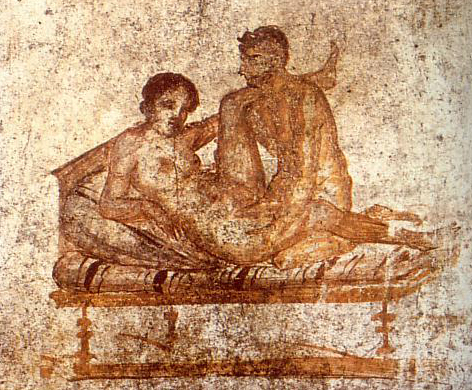
An erotic bed scene from a mural of Pompeii

The arches under the circus perimeter were a favored location for prostitutes. These vaulted arcade dens were thought to resemble furnaces "fornices", from which derives the English word fornication.

The taverns were generally regarded by the magistrates as brothels and the waitresses were so regarded by the law. The poem "The Barmaid" ("Copa"), attributed to Virgil, proves that even the proprietress had two strings to her bow, and Horace, in describing his excursion to Brundisium, narrates his experience with a waitress in an inn. "Here like a triple fool I waited till midnight for a lying jade till sleep overcame me, intent on venery; in that filthy vision the dreams spot my night clothes and my belly, as I lie upon my back." The Aeserman inscription provides a dialogue between the tavern hostess and a transient. The bill for the services of a girl amounted to 8 asses. That bakers were not slow in organizing the grist mills is shown by a passage from Paulus Diaconus: "as time went on, the owners of these turned the public corn mills into pernicious frauds. For, as the mill stones were fixed in places under ground, they set up booths on either side of these chambers and caused prostitutes to stand for hire in them, so that by these means they deceived very many, some that came for bread, others that hastened thither for the base gratification of their wantonness." From a passage in Festus, it would seem that this was first put into practice in Campania: "prostitutes were called 'aelicariae', 'spelt-mill girls, in Campania, being accustomed to ply for gain before the mills of the spelt-millers". "Common strumpets, bakers' mistresses, refuse the spelt-mill girls," says Plautus.

The Theatre of Pompey features multiple statues of women. Coarelli believed that the statues at Pompey's villa were of famous courtesans, after correlating the named statues with texts featuring named prostitutes. However, some scholars argue that these are actual female artists, such as poets, muses, and heroines. There is not enough evidence in the correlation between the names to suggest they are all prostitutes.

== Prostitution and religion ==
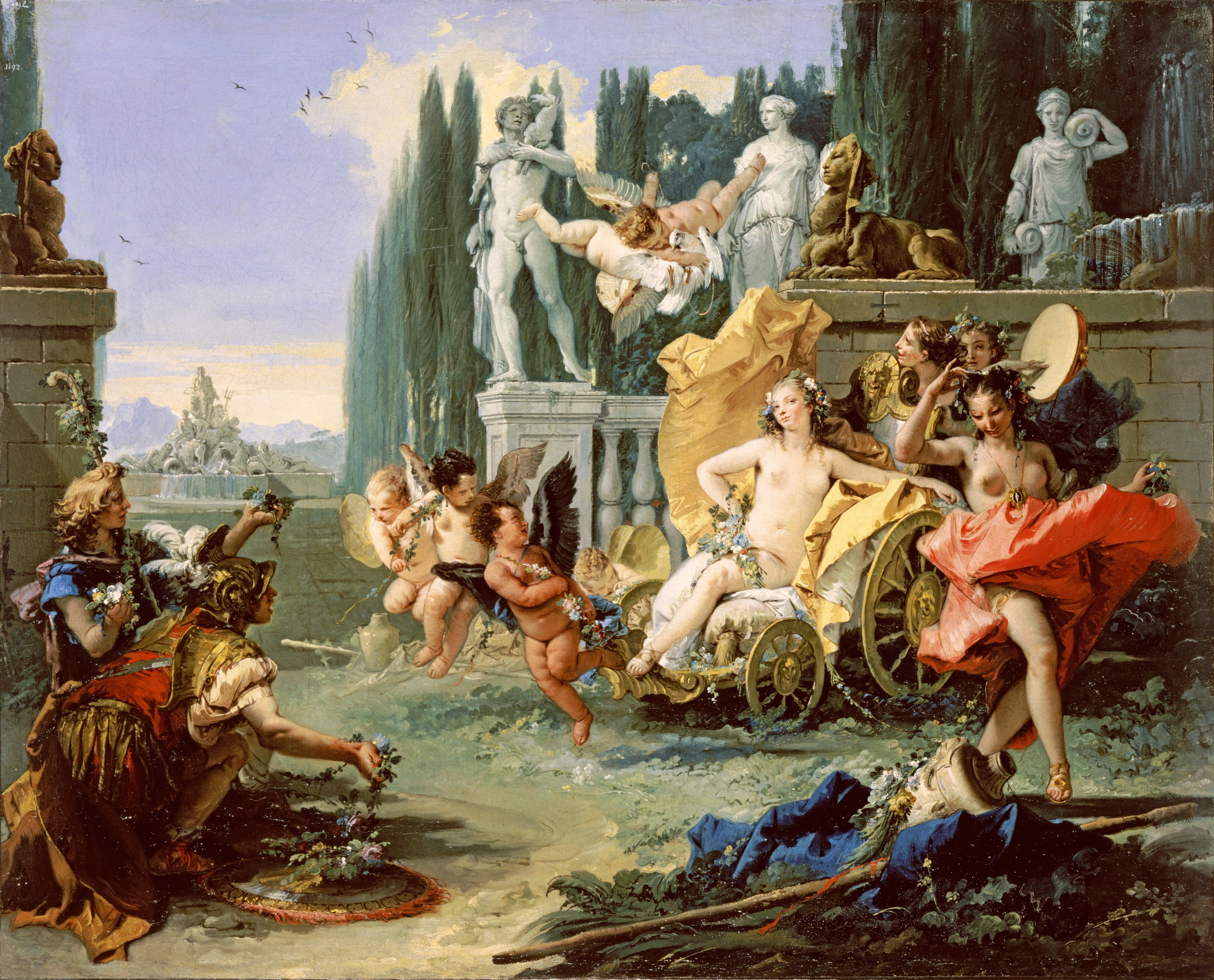
The Triumph of Flora (ca. 1743), an Italian Baroque interpretation based on Ovid's account of the Floralia, by Giovanni Battista Tiepolo

Usually, the line between respectable women and the infames was carefully drawn. Anyone who sold their body for the entertainment of others or exposed themselves to the public gaze, lost much of their protection and many of their rights under Roman law, even if they were citizen. Some priestesses, and in particular the Vestals, were assumed to be models of perfect chastity, protected from ritual pollution by a lictor when going about their public duties. Lictors were provided by Rome's senior priest, the pontifex maximus, and were empowered to remove any "impure persons" not merely from the priestess's intended path but from her sight, with violence if need be.

Some cults, festivals, and temples excluded prostitutes altogether, but a few offered them a central role. The month of April was sacred to Venus, divine patron of sex, love and prostitutes. On the first of the month, women worshipped Fortuna Virilis ("Manly good fortune") and Venus Verticordia ("Venus changer of hearts") conjointly, at the Veneralia festival. Venus Verticordia was introduced by the elite, in an effort to encourage traditional moral values among women of the middle and elite classes, and thus win divine approval. According to Ovid, prostitutes and respectable married women (matronae) shared in the ritual cleansing and reclothing of the cult statue of Fortuna Virilis. On 23 April, prostitutes and "common girls" gave cult to Venus Erycina, whose temple was just outside Rome's ritual boundary; a sacred aspect of Venus but with Carthaginian origins, and not entirely respectable. Her festival coincided with the Vinalia, celebrating the "everyday wine" of Venus and the superior, sacred vintage fit for Jupiter and men of the Roman elite. "Pimped-out boys" (pueri lenonii) were celebrated on 25 April, the same day as the Robigalia, a festival to protect grain crops from fungal infestation.

On 27 April, and for six days of ludi during the Imperial era, the Floralia was held in honour of the goddess Flora, goddess of fertility, flowers. It was typically plebeian in character; disinhibited, colourful and licentious. According to Juvenal and Lactantius, it featured erotic dancing and stripping by prostitutes, instigated by the crowd. Juvenal also refers to nude dancing, and perhaps to prostitutes fighting in mock gladiatorial contests at Floriala.

== Medieval meretrix ==
In medieval Europe, a meretrix was understood as any woman held in common, who “turned no one away”. It was generally understood that money would be involved in this transaction, but it did not have to be: rather, it was promiscuousness that defined the meretrix.

Medieval Christian authors often discouraged prostitution, but did not consider it a serious offence and under some circumstances even considered marrying a harlot to be an act of piety. It was possible to both rise out of and fall into the category, as with tales of prostitutes repenting to become saints.

Certain modern professors of feminism have argued that a meretrix in the medieval mindset is closer to our modern understanding of a sexual identity or orientation.

== See also ==
- Hetaira
- History of prostitution
- History of human sexuality
- Infamia
- Pederasty in Ancient Greece
- Petronius Arbiter
- Propertius
- Prostitution in ancient Greece
- Sexuality in ancient Rome
- Sexuality in ancient Greece

== Bibliography ==
- Balsdon, John Percy Vyvian Dacre (1963), Roman Women. Their History and Habits, J. Day
- Biffi, Giacomo (2000), Casta meretrix: "the chaste whore" : an essay on the ecclesiology of St. Ambrose, Saint Austin Press, ISBN 978-1-901157-34-5
- Brundage, James A. (1990), "Prostitution", Law, sex, and Christian society in medieval Europe, University of Chicago Press, ISBN 978-0-226-07784-0
- Culham, Phyllis (2004), "Women in the Roman Republic", in Flower, Harriet I. (ed.), The Cambridge Companion to the Roman Republic, Cambridge University Press, ISBN 9781107669420
- Dillon, Matthew; Garland, Lynda (2005), Ancient Rome: From the Early Republic to the Assassination of Julius Caesar, Taylor & Francis, ISBN 9780415224581
- Duckworth, George Eckel (1994), The nature of Roman comedy: a study in popular entertainment, University of Oklahoma Press, ISBN 978-0-8061-2620-3
- Duncan, Anne (2006), "Infamous performers : comic actors and female prostitutes in Rome", in Faraone, Christopher A.; McClure, Laura (eds.), Prostitutes and Courtesans in the Ancient World, Wisconsin studies in classics, Madison: University of Wisconsin Press, ISBN 0-299-21314-5
- Edwards, Catherine (1997), "Unspeakable Professions Public Performance and Prostitution in Ancient Rome", in Hallett, Judith P.; Skinner, Marilyn B. (eds.), Roman Sexualities, Princeton University Press, ISBN 0691011788
- McGinn, Thomas A. J. (1998), Prostitution, Sexuality, and the Law in Ancient Rome, Oxford University Press, ISBN 9780195161328
- McGinn, Thomas A. (2004), The economy of prostitution in the Roman world: a study of social history & the brothel, University of Michigan Press, ISBN 978-0-472-11362-0
- Ovid (2003), Gibson, Roy K. (ed.), Ars Amatoria, Cambridge University Press, ISBN 978-0-521-81370-9
- Petronius (2009), The Satyricon, OUP Oxford, ISBN 9780199539215
- Phillips, Kim M.; Reay, Barry (2002), Sexualities in History: A Reader, Routledge, ISBN 9780415929356
- Strong, Anise K. (2016), "Prostitutes and matrons in the urban landscape", Prostitutes and Matrons in the Roman World, Cambridge: Cambridge University Press, pp. 142–170, doi:10.1017/CBO9781316563083.007, ISBN 9781316563083
- Keenan, James G. (1989), Roman Criminal Law in a Berlin Papyrus Codex (BGU IV 1024–1027)1024–1027), Loyola University Chicago, pp. 19–20
