= Tutilia gens =

Ancient Roman family

The gens Tutilia was a minor plebeian family at ancient Rome. No members of this gens came to prominence until imperial times, but two of them attained the consulship under the Antonines.

== Origin ==
The nomen Tutilius belongs to a large class of gentilicia originally formed from cognomina ending in the diminutive suffix -ulus. The root of the name may be either the Latin tutus, "safe", or perhaps the Oscan touto, a people. The name may also be connected with that of the Roman goddess Tutilina.

== Members ==
This list includes abbreviated praenomina. For an explanation of this practice, see filiation.

- Tutilius, (Note: Erroneously given as "Rutilius" in some manuscripts.) an orator, and the father-in-law of Quintilian. He was respected as a scholar of rhetoric, but nothing of his work has survived.
- Tutilia, the wife of Quintilian.
- Lucius Tutilius Lupercus Sulpicius Avitus, a relative of the consul Lupercus Pontianus, named on a sepulchral inscription from Falerii in Etruria, dating from the latter half of the first century.
- Lucius Tutilius Lupercus Pontianus, consul in AD 135, with Publius Calpurnius Atilianus.
- Tutilius Pontianus, either the elder brother or the father of Tutilius Lupercus.
- Tutilius Lupercus, either the younger brother or son of Tutilius Pontianus.
- Lucius Tutilius Pontianus Gentianus, although guilty of adultery with the empress Faustina, his career was nonetheless advanced by Marcus Aurelius. He was consul suffectus under Commodus, early in AD 183.
- Tutilia L. f. Procula, probably a noblewoman, named on lead pipes from Rome.

== See also ==
- List of Roman gentes

== Bibliography ==
=== Ancient sources ===
- Marcus Fabius Quintilianus (Quintilian), Institutio Oratoria (Institutes of Oratory).
- Marcus Valerius Martialis (Martial), Epigrammata (Epigrams).
- Gaius Plinius Caecilius Secundus (Pliny the Younger), Epistulae (Letters).
- Aelius Lampridius, Aelius Spartianus, Flavius Vopiscus, Julius Capitolinus, Trebellius Pollio, and Vulcatius Gallicanus, Historia Augusta (Lives of the Emperors).

=== Modern sources ===
- Jean-Pierre Cèbe, Varron, Satires Ménippées (Varro's Menippean Satires), École Française de Rome, (1972–1999).
- George Davis Chase, "The Origin of Roman Praenomina", in Harvard Studies in Classical Philology, vol. VIII, pp. 103–184 (1897).
- Dictionary of Greek and Roman Biography and Mythology, William Smith, ed., Little, Brown and Company, Boston (1849).
- Theodor Mommsen et alii, Corpus Inscriptionum Latinarum (The Body of Latin Inscriptions, abbreviated CIL), Berlin-Brandenburgische Akademie der Wissenschaften (1853–present).
- Paul von Rohden, Elimar Klebs, & Hermann Dessau, Prosopographia Imperii Romani (The Prosopography of the Roman Empire, abbreviated PIR), Berlin (1898).
