= Veneralia =

Festival of Venus the changer of hearts

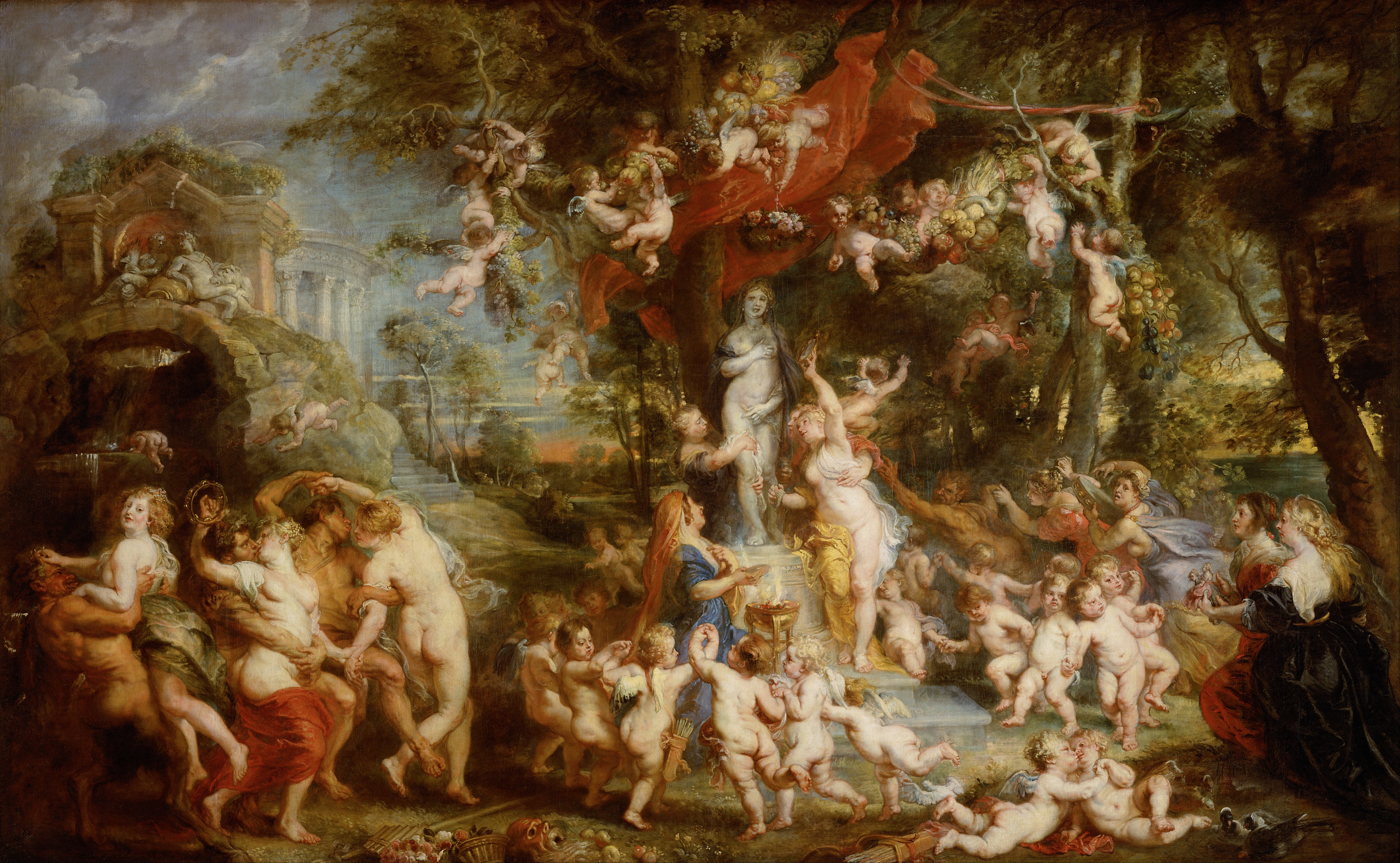
- The Feast of Venus by Rubens is a fanciful depiction of women celebrating Veneralia surrounded by mythological creatures
- Observed by: Ancient Romans
- Type: Classical Roman religion
- Observances: Ritual bathing and adornment of the cult statue of Venus
- Date: April 1

The Veneralia was an ancient Roman festival celebrated April 1 (the Kalends of Aprilis) in honor of Venus Verticordia ("Venus the changer of hearts") and Fortuna Virilis ("Manly" or "Virile Fortune").

The cult of Venus Verticordia was established in 220 BC, just before the beginning of the Second Punic War, in response to advice from a Sibylline oracle, when a series of prodigies was taken to signify divine displeasure at sexual offenses among Romans of every category and class, including several men and three Vestal Virgins. Her statue was dedicated by a young woman, chosen as the most pudica (sexually pure) in Rome by a committee of Roman matrons. At first, the statue was probably housed within the temple to Fortuna Virilis. This cult, older than that to Venus Verticordia but possibly perceived as weak or gone to seed, may have benefited from the moral and religious support of Venus as a relatively new but senior deity; for Ovid, Venus's acceptance of the epithet and its responsibilities represented the goddess's own change of heart. In 114 BC Venus Verticordia was given her own temple. She was meant to persuade Romans of both sexes and every class, whether married or unmarried, to cherish the traditional sexual proprieties and morality known to please the gods and benefit the State. During the Veneralia, her cult image was taken from her temple to the men's baths, where it was undressed and washed in warm water by her female attendants, then garlanded with myrtle. At the Veneralia, women and men asked Venus Verticordia for her help in affairs of the heart, sex, betrothal and marriage. Fortuna Virilis was given cult on the same day.

== See also ==
- April Fools' Day
