= Insitor =

Roman god of the sowing of crops

- Minor god of Fields; God of sowing crops

Insitor was, in Ancient Roman religion, a minor agricultural deity involved with the sowing of crops. His name was invoked during the Cerealia, along with the other 11 helper gods of Ceres.
