= Fortuna Virilis =

Manifestation of goddess Fortuna in Roman religion

In ancient Roman religion, Fortuna Virilis was an aspect or manifestation of the goddess Fortuna who despite her name (virilis, "virile, manly") was cultivated by women only. She shared a festival day with Venus Verticordia on April 1 (Kalendae Aprilis), which first appears with the name Veneralia in the mid-4th century AD.

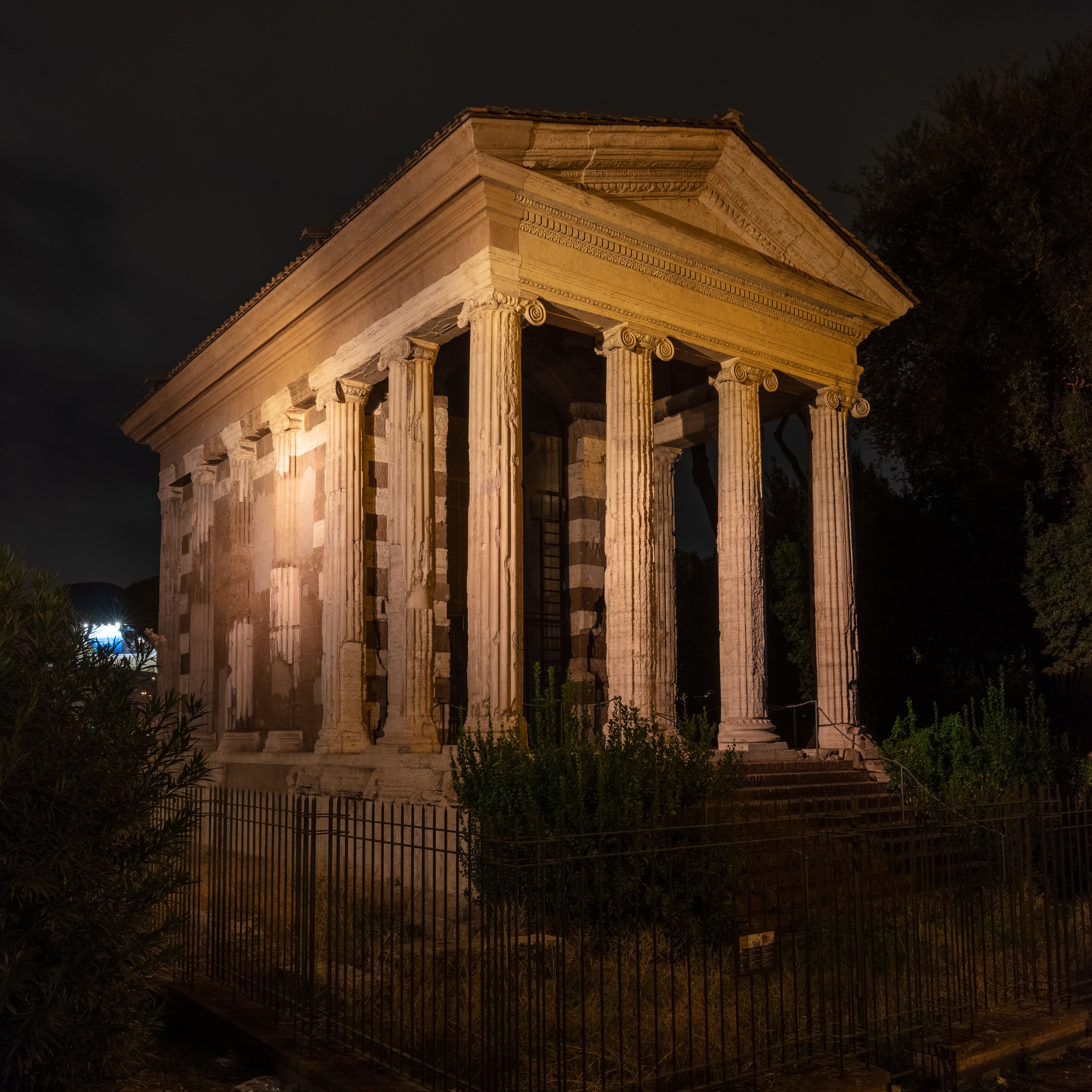
Temple of Portunus in the Forum Boarium

According to the poet Ovid, Fortuna Virilis had the power to conceal the physical imperfections of women from the eyes of men. During the Veneralia, she receives an offering of incense, while the more elaborate ceremonies are devoted to Venus. A note from Verrius Flaccus in the fragmentary calendar known as the Fasti Praenestini has been interpreted to mean that respectable women of the upper classes (honestiores) observed the Veneralia separately from those of lesser rank or dubious reputation (humiliores and prostitutes).

Valerius Maximus refers to the Temple of Fortuna Virilis in his Factorum ac dictorum memorabilium libri IX in book 1,8,4. Plutarch is another source to mention the Temple of Fortuna Virilis, which he says was founded by Servius Tullius. Because of her association with Venus Verticordia, Fortuna Virilis may likewise have had her temple in the Vallis Murcia. A temple in the Forum Boarium sometimes identified as that of Fortuna Virilis is more likely to belong to Portunus, though possibly it was built for Portunus and rededicated to Fortuna Virilis. In the early Middle Ages it was converted to a church perhaps called Santa Maria de Secundicerio.

== See also ==
- Dea Viriplaca
