= Saritor =

Ancient Roman god of weeding and hoeing

- Minor god of Fields; God of hoeing

In Roman mythology, Saritor or Sarritor was the god of hoeing. His name was invoked during the Cerealia, along with the other 11 helper gods of Ceres.
