= Tutilina =

Tutelary goddess in Roman religion

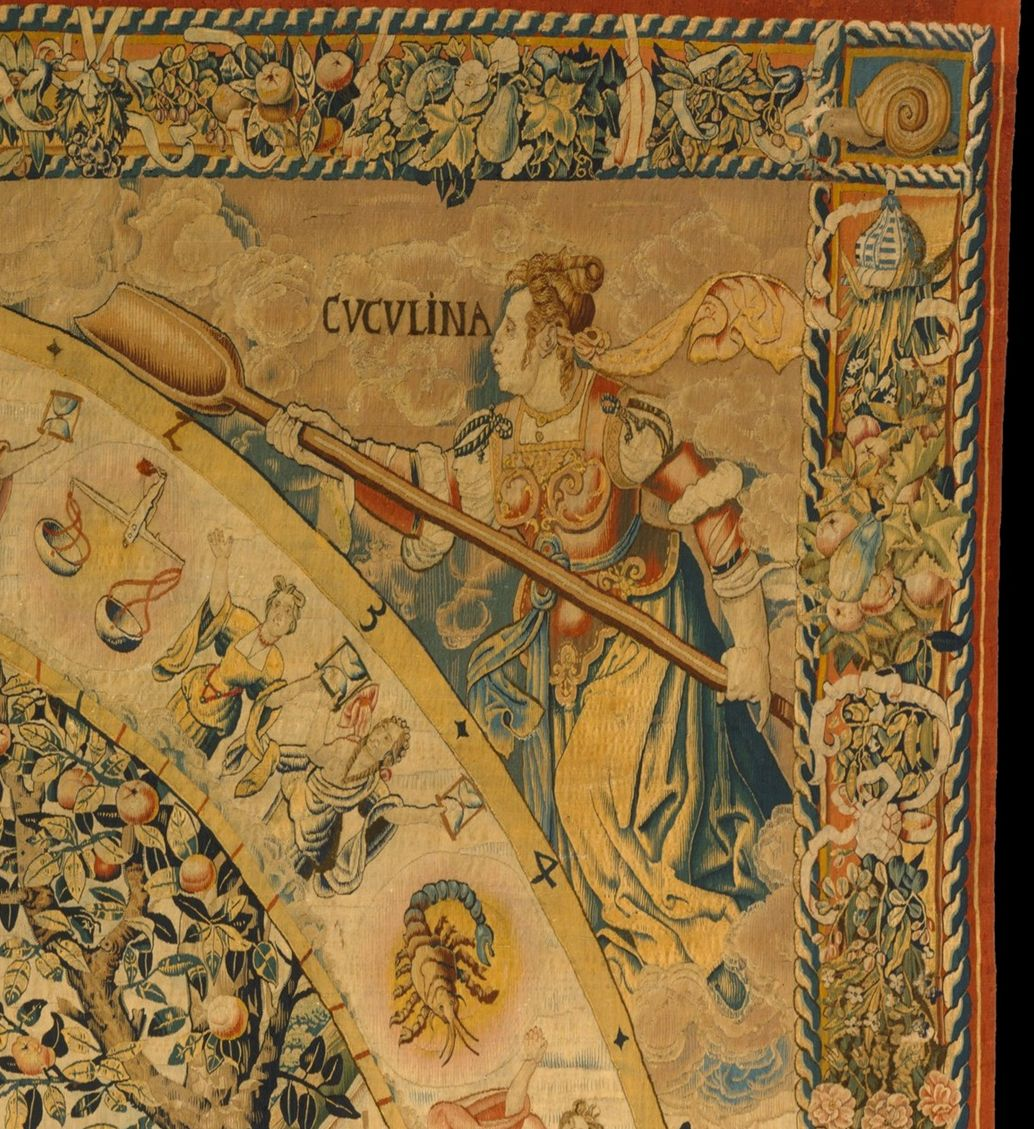
Representation of Tutilina (mis-spelled CVCVLINA) with winnowing shovel in a sixteenth-century Flemish tapestry

Tutilina (also Tutelina, Tutulina) was in Roman religion a tutelary goddess, apparently responsible for protecting crops brought in during harvest time.

== Etymology ==
The meaning of the name is sometimes given as 'protectress', but uncertainty as to the vowel-lengths (which may moreover have been different in different writers' usages) leaves the etymology of the name subject to debate. In the estimation of J.-P. Cèbe, "Tutilina était primitivement la patronne de la gens Tutilia. Mais une fausse étymologie fit ensuite, dans le peuple, rapprocher son nom de tueri et elle devint alors une déesse tutélaire des Romains".

== Role in Republican Roman belief ==
Marcus Terentius Varro's fragmentary text De lingua Latina mentions that one Porcius said that the earlier Roman poet Ennius 'coluisse Tutilinae loca' ('dwelt in the locality of Tutilina'). This indicates that Tutilina gave her name to part of Rome; Otto Skutsch argued specifically through a close analysis of the passage that there was a Porta Tutilinae ('Gate of Tutilina') in Rome's walls, and that this name was perhaps an earlier name for the Porta Capena. Another work by Varro, the fragmentary Satirae Menippeae, mentions that Tutilina could also be invoked during a siege. Pliny the Elder's Naturalis historia, Tertullian's De spectaculis, and Macrobius's Saturnalia all attest to statues of three goddesses, including Tutilina, in the Circus Maximus. Tertullian (c. 155–c. 220 CE) was a Christian, and his De spectaculis explored whether Christians should attend such spectacles and the circus or theatre. His description of the Circus Maximus says:

Every ornament of the circus is a temple by itself. The eggs are regarded as sacred to Castor and Pollux by people who do not feel ashamed to believe the story of their origin from the egg made fertile by the swan, Jupiter. The dolphins spout water in honor of Neptune; the columns bear aloft images of Seia, so called from sementatio ['sowing']; of Messia, so called as a deity of messis ['reaping']; and of Tutulina, so called as "tutelary spirit" of the crops.

== Reception ==
Augustine of Hippo's De civitate Dei mentions Tutilina alongside other gods and goddesses in a passage complaining about the number of pagan deities:

how is it possible in one passage of this book to record all the names of the gods and goddesses that they were scarcely able to find room for in the huge volumes in which they divided up the services of the deities among the departments, assigning each to his own? They did not reach the conclusion that they should put some god in charge of all their land, but assigned fields to the goddess Rusina, mountain peaks to the god Jugatinus, hills to the goddess Collatina, and valleys to Vallonia. Nor could they even find a single Segetia who was worthy to be entrusted once for all with the grain in the fields (segetes), but as long as the seed was under ground they chose to have the goddess Seia in charge, then when it was above ground and moving toward harvest, the goddess Segetia, and when the grain was harvested and stored away, they gave the goddess Tutulina the job of guarding it safely.

In his Summa predicantium, composed in the 1360s, John Bromyard named a demon who had since the thirteenth century been reputed to introduce mistakes into people's psalm-singing as Titivillus; Titivillus later came to be seen as a demon who causes scribal errors. Other sources include such spellings as Tintillus, Tantillus, Tintinillus, Titivilarius and Titivilitarius. André Vernet argued that this name originated as a masculine variant, Tutilinus, of Tutilina, invented by medieval scholars on the basis of their knowledge of this pagan goddess through Augustine's City of God.

Tutelina Mill, Great Welnetham, built in the nineteenth century, shares its name with the goddess.

== See also ==
- Ceres (mythology)
