= Robigalia =

Ancient Roman festival

- Duration: April 25
- Type: Festival

The Robigalia was a festival in ancient Roman religion held April 25, named for the god Robigus. Its main ritual was a dog sacrifice to protect grain fields from disease. Games (ludi) in the form of "major and minor" races were held. The Robigalia was one of several agricultural festivals in April to celebrate and vitalize the growing season, but the darker sacrificial elements of these occasions are also fraught with anxiety about crop failure and the dependence on divine favor to avert it.

== Description ==
The Robigalia was held at the boundary of the Ager Romanus. Verrius Flaccus sites it in a grove (lucus) at the fifth milestone from Rome along the Via Claudia. The celebration included games (ludi) and a sacrificial offering of the blood and entrails of an unweaned puppy (catulus). Most animal sacrifice in the public religion of ancient Rome resulted in a communal meal and thus involved domestic animals whose flesh was a normal part of the Roman diet; the dog occurs as a victim most often in magic and private rites for Hecate and other chthonic deities, but was offered publicly at the Lupercalia and two other sacrifices pertaining to grain crops.

== Origin ==
Like many other aspects of Roman law and religion, the institution of the Robigalia was attributed to the Sabine Numa Pompilius, in the eleventh year of his reign as the second king of Rome. The combined presence of Numa and the flamen Quirinalis, the high priest of Quirinus, the Sabine god of war who become identified with Mars, may suggest a Sabine origin.

The late Republican scholar Varro says that the Robigalia was named for the god Robigus, who as the numen or personification of agricultural disease could also prevent it. He was thus a potentially malignant deity to be propitiated, as Aulus Gellius notes. But the gender of this deity is elusive. The agricultural writer Columella gives the name in the feminine as Robigo, like the word used for a form of the disease of wheat rust, which has a reddish or reddish-brown color. Both Robigus and robigo are also found as Rubig- which, following the etymology-by-association of antiquity, was thought to be connected to the color red (ruber) as a form of homeopathic or sympathetic magic. Festus, a 2nd-century Roman grammarian, describes a sacrifice of red dogs ("rufae canes") whose color was supposed to resemble ripe corn. It is possible, though not certain, that these dogs were offered at sacrifices to Robigus.

William Warde Fowler, whose work on Roman festivals remains a standard reference, entertained the idea that Robigus is an "indigitation" of Mars, that is, a name to be used in a prayer formulary to fix the local action of the invoked god. In support of this idea, the priest who presided was the flamen Quirinalis, and the ludi were held for both Mars and Robigo. The flamen recited a prayer that Ovid quotes at length in the Fasti, his six-book calendar poem on Roman holidays which provides the most extended, though problematic, description of the day.

== Other observances ==
Chariot races (ludi cursoribus) were held in honor of Mars and Robigo on this day. The races had two classes, "major and minor," which may represent junior and senior divisions. In chariot racing, younger drivers seem to have gained experience with a two-horse chariot (biga) before graduating to a four-horse team (quadriga).

Other horse and chariot races in honor of Mars occurred at the Equirria and before the sacrifice of the October Horse.

== Calendar context ==
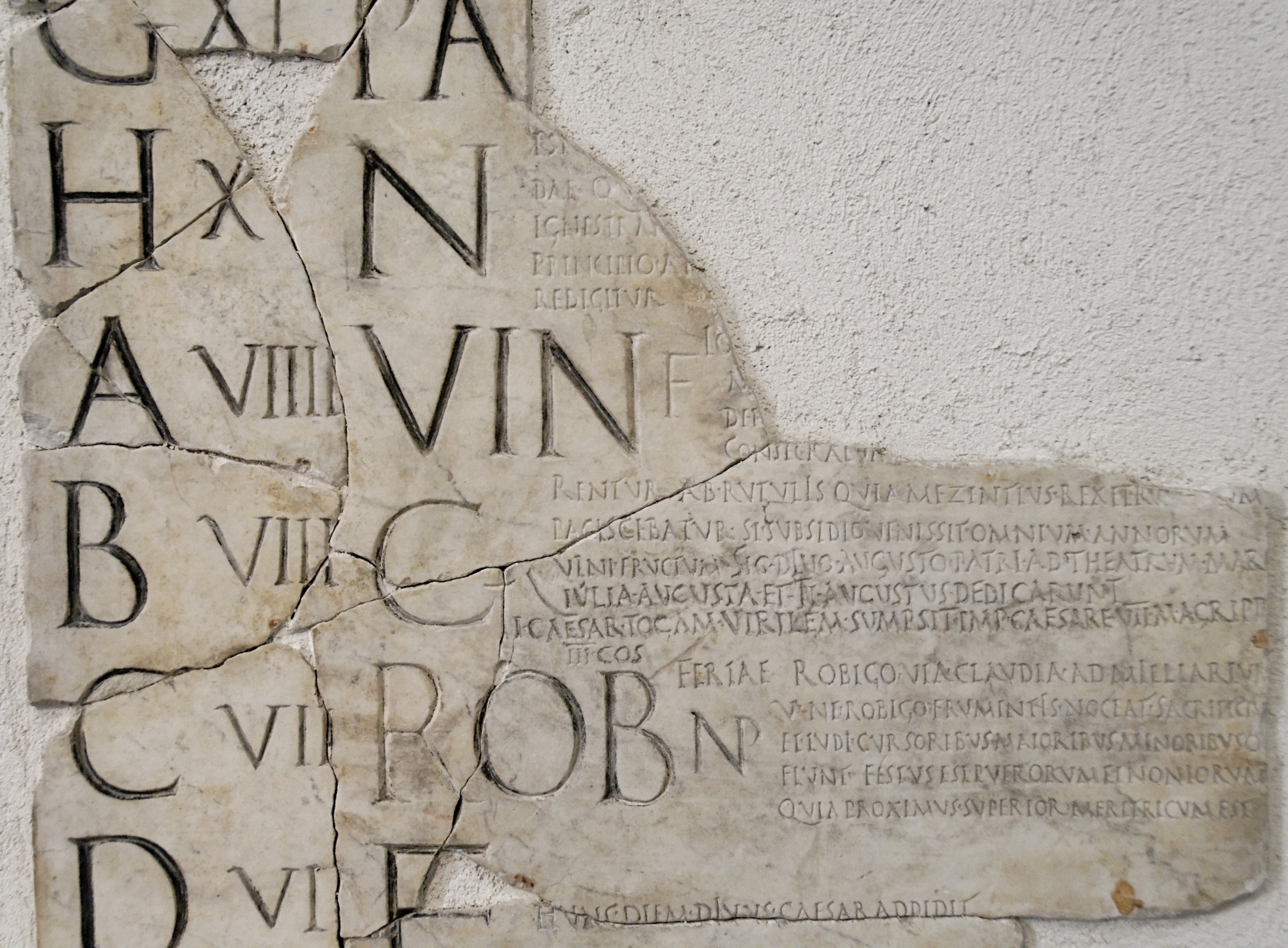
A section of the Fasti Praenestini, with the entry on the "Feast of Robigo" at bottom right ("ROB").

The Fasti Praenestini also record that on the same day the festival celebrated a particular class of sex workers: "pimped-out boys," following the previous day's recognition of meretrices, female prostitutes regarded as professionals of some standing.

Other April festivals related to farming were the Cerealia, or festival of Ceres, lasting for several days in mid-month; the Fordicidia on April 15, when a pregnant cow was sacrificed; the Parilia on April 21 to ensure healthy flocks; and the Vinalia, a wine festival on April 23. Varro considered these and the Robigalia, along with the Great Mother's Megalensia late in the month, the "original" Roman holidays in April.

The Robigalia has been connected to the Christian feast of Rogation, which was concerned with purifying and blessing the parish and fields and which took the place of the Robigalia on April 25 of the Christian calendar. The Church Father Tertullian mocks the goddess Robigo as "made up," a fiction.
