= Venus Obsequens =

Venus Obsequens ("Compliant Venus") was the first Venus for whom a shrine (aedes) was built in ancient Rome. Little is known of her cult beyond the circumstances of her temple founding and a likely connection to the Vinalia Rustica, an August wine festival. (Note: Ancient sources on Venus Obsequens and her temple include Livy 10.31.9, 29.37.2; Festus 322 in the edition of Lindsay; Servius on Aeneid 1.720; Fasti Vallenses (Degrassi 497–498).)

== On the calendar ==
The anniversary (dies natalis) of the Temple of Venus Obsequens is thought to have been celebrated August 19, the day of the Vinalia Rustica, the second wine festival of the year on the Roman calendar. The Vinalia appears on the oldest calendars without a connection to Venus, but Varro's reference to an aedes dedicated to her on August 19 has been taken as this temple. The other Vinalia was celebrated in April, the month over which Venus held guardianship (tutela), on the 23rd, which after 215 BC was also the feast day of Venus Erycina. Both wine festivals were held originally in honor of Jupiter with the complex associations of Venus incorporated. The Romans attributed the uninhibited behaviors induced by wine-drinking to Venus exercising her powers through Liber.

Gardens were dedicated to Venus on August 19 as well. The Temple of Venus Libitina, a goddess of death, celebrated its dies natalis on the same day, in a part of Rome on the Esquiline Hill where funerary services were concentrated. Plutarch saw this Venus as encompassing the regenerative cycle of birth and death, but Varro distinguished between Libitina and Libentina, the latter inspiring "sensual pleasure".

== The epithet obsequens ==
Although Venus had an archaic origin in Rome and Latium, the cult of Venus Obsequens was the earliest established in the Greek manner to Venus equated with Aphrodite as a goddess of sexuality. The adjective obsequens, often translated as "deferential" (hence English "obsequious"), as a divine epithet expresses favor or active support – a "propitious" Venus.

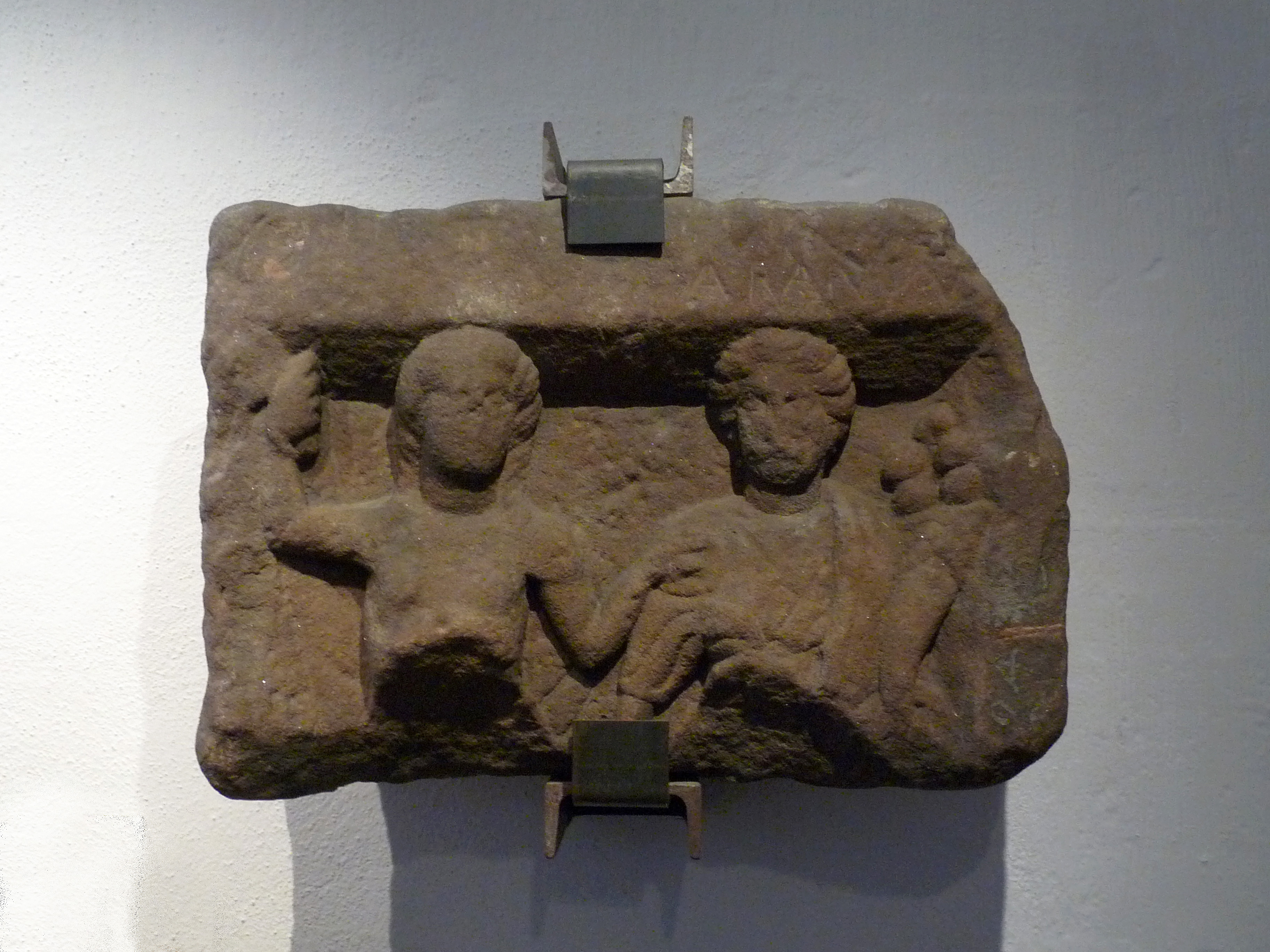
Sandstone relief of Venus and Fortuna, 3rd century AD, from Lembach (Musée archéologique de Strasbourg)

The association of Venus and Fortuna in Roman religion is of long standing; (Note: Often cited on this point is the "seminal" work of Jacqueline Champeaux, Fortuna: Le culte de la Fortune à Rome et dans le monde romain des origins à la mort de César (École française de Rome, 1982).) Servius Tullius, semilegendary sixth king of Rome, is supposed to have set up an altar to Fortuna within a precinct of Venus, along with his many other dedications to Fortuna. A Fortuna Obsequens is known from inscriptions, a mention in an early comedy by Plautus, and Plutarch.

The cultivation of "Venus the Obedient" overtly expresses "an attempt to control the goddess", though counterbalanced over time by other instantiations such as Venus Erycina, originally a goddess of prostitution celebrated with sexual license. The establishment of state cult for Venus Erycina mirrors that for Obsequens in several particulars, including the authority of the Sibylline Books and a dies natalis on the second Vinalia (April 23); Erycina's temple was vowed in 217 BC by Quintus Fabius Maximus Cunctator, the grandson of the founder of the Temple of Venus Obsequens.

== Temple founding ==
Sited near the southeast end of the Circus Maximus at the edge of the Forum Boarium and facing the foot of the Aventine, the Temple of Venus Obsequens was built in 295 BC by the curule aedile Quintus Fabius Maximus Gurges during the Third Samnite War. The timing of the construction suggests that Fabius Gurges built it in thanks for his father's victory the previous year at the Battle of Sentinum. The foundation legend for Gurges' temple indicates that from an early date, the favor of Venus was felt as contributing both to success in war and sexuality. Her power was the force of desire or intention; the Vergil commentator Servius explains that Gurges had built the temple to Venus Obsequens "because she had gone along with him".

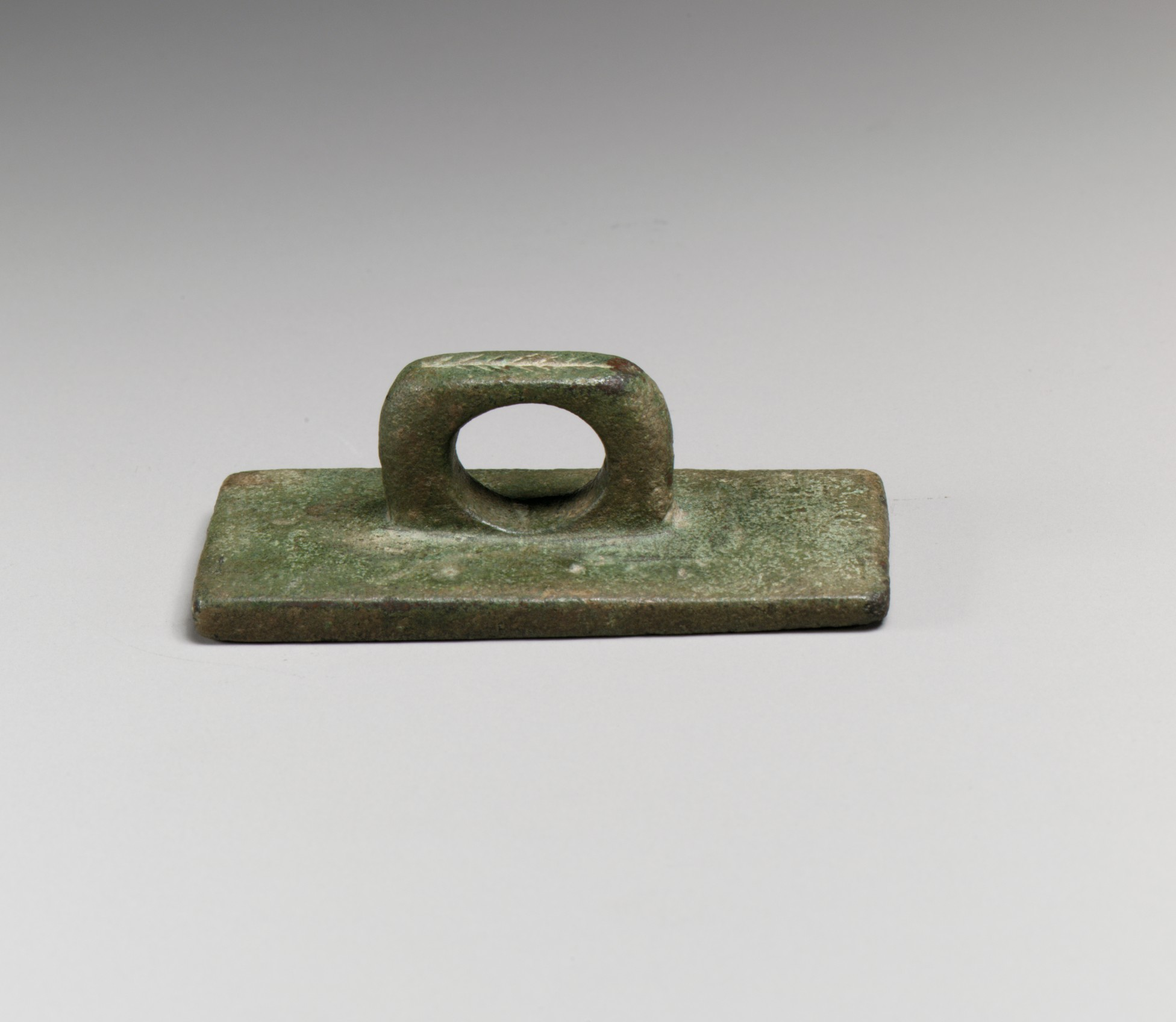
Bronze stamp (1st–2nd century AD) for marking objects with Veneris obsequentis (genitive case), "of [belonging to] Venus Obsequens", perhaps used in conjunction with the temple (Metropolitan Museum of Art)

In the year 295 BC, Rome had been subject to pestilence, and prodigies had prompted the consultation of the libri, the Sibylline books. The Obsequens cult was founded following a perceived outbreak of sexual misconduct (stuprum) among matronae (ordinarily a term for respectable married women), which was supposedly so widespread that Gurges could fund the project from the fines he collected.

The line of thought that led from the victory at Sentinum to funding the temple with fines for stuprum is not recorded, but it was one in a series of foundings based on regulating female behavior as a religious response to social disorder particularly in time of war or crisis for the Roman state. In 331 BC Rome's first trial for poisoning had resulted in the conviction of 170 matrons, (Note: For the year 331 BC, the Augustan-era historian Livy rather skeptically records (8.18.1–14) that the aediles were presented with a handmaid (ancilla) who testified that what appeared to be a pandemic (publica pestis) actually arose from a ring of poisoners. The ancilla led them to a gathering where twenty matrons, under the guidance of two patricians, were preparing what they insisted were curative medicaments. They were arrested, and in their defense they agreed to drink the remedies themselves. Their consequent deaths were not taken as evidence that intent was lacking but simply as proof that the medicaments were the cause. Although their minds were said to have been "captured" (captis mentibus), and Roman law recognized that a person in the grip of mental illness could not be held legally culpable, an outbreak of collective insanity on this scale was taken as a prodigy. Expiation included the appointment of a dictator to carry out the ritual driving of a nail.) and the involvement of patrician women may suggest that the founding of the scantly attested Temple of Pudicitia Patricia was a consequence. Pudicitia was the virtue by which women were to demonstrate their excellence, often invoked in settings when married women were competing for social standing, encompassing sexual integrity and self-discipline equivalent to virtus, "manly" virtue. In 296 BC, a corresponding cult for Pudicitia Plebeia was established so that plebeians could compete as pudicae. Participation in both cults was limited to univirae, women who had married only once. The Temple of Venus Obsequens is one of the proposed locations of the first statue, dedicated in 220 BC, to Venus Verticordia ("Heart-Turner"), whose sphere of influence was diverting sexual desire into marital expression.

== The matrons' stuprum ==
The historian Livy says (Note: Livy 10.31.8–9: "The year, though one of success in war, was saddened by a pestilence and vexed with prodigies. Showers of earth were reported to have fallen in many places, and it was said that in the army of Appius Claudius many had been struck by lightning. On account of these signs the Sibylline books were consulted. in this year Quintus Fabius Gurges, the consul's son, assessed a fine of money against a number of married women who were convicted before the people of adultery" – less precisely, stuprum – "and with this money erected the temple of Venus which is near the Circus," in the 1926 translation of B. F. Foster (Felix annus bellicis rebus, pestilentia gravis prodigiisque sollicitus; nam et terram multifariam pluvisse et in exercitu Ap. Claudi plerosque fulminibus ictos nuntiatum est; librique ob haec aditi. Eo anno Q. Fabius Gurges consulis filius aliquot matronas ad populum stupri damnatas pecunia multavit; ex multaticio aere Veneris aedem quae prope Circum est faciendam curavit).) that the matrons were convicted of stuprum, an all-purpose word for sexual misconduct, originally meaning any disgraceful act, which by his own time had become a matter of public law owing to Augustan moral legislation. The view of Mario Torelli and Richard Bauman that these upper-class women had literally prostituted themselves, based in part on the intervention of an aedile, (Note: The aediles were charged with regulating commerce, and in this role also registered prostitutes to practice their trade.) is not widely held. However, Livy's insistence that many women were involved may indicate a widespread societal issue in which wives were left socially and financially adrift during wartime and sought companionship and material support. A comparable incident occurred in 213 BC, when Italy was invaded during the Punic Wars and large numbers of men were called into military service: two plebeian aediles convicted a number of women of stuprum and sent them into exile.

Adultery might be more plausible in the case that resulted in the Obsequens cult; the temple may have served as a public warning against infidelity. The matrons were brought before an aedile as a matter of public rather than private law, and yet their offenses seem to have been regarded as less serious than sex crimes that could result in capital penalties. That fines were deemed a sufficient penalty may suggest "something less than adultery". Jane F. Gardner conjectured that the matrons were guilty of "nothing more than disorderly and uninhibited behaviour 'under the influence'" at festivals where women drank wine, such as the feast of Anna Perenna and the two Vinalia in honor of Venus – "debauched picnics" that allowed them to cast off their usual propriety in the guise of religion. They may not have been "guilty" of anything; but since a conviction for stuprum could result in exile, property forfeiture as a consequence might explain the source of temple funding more fully than mere fines.

== See also ==
- Dea Viriplaca

== Sources ==
- Barrow, Rosemary (2018). Silk, Michael (ed.). Gender, Identity and the Body in Greek and Roman Sculpture. Cambridge University Press.
- Bauman, Richard (1992). Women and Politics in Ancient Rome (1994 ed.). Routledge.
- Buszard, Bradley (2023). Greek Translations of Roman Gods. De Gruyter.
- Eden, P. T. (1963). "Venus and the Cabbage". Hermes. 91 (4): 448–459. JSTOR 4475274.
- Erskine, Andrew (2001). Troy Between Greece and Rome. Oxford University Press.
- Fantham, Elaine (1998). Ovid: Fasti Book IV. Cambridge Greek and Latin Classics. Cambridge University Press.
- Fantham, Elaine (2002a). "The Fasti as a Source for Women's Participation in Roman Cult". In Herbert-Brown, Geraldine (ed.). Ovid's Fasti: Historical Readings at Its Bimillennium. Oxford University Press. pp. 23–46.
- Fantham, Elaine (2002b). "Ovid's Fasti: Politics, History, and Religion". In Weiden Boyd, Barbara (ed.). Brill's Companion to Ovid. Brill. pp. 197–234.
- Fantham, Elaine (2011). Roman Readings: Roman Response to Greek Literature from Plautus to Statius and Quintilian. De Gruyter.
- Gardner, Jane F. (1986). Women in Roman Law and Society (1995 ed.). Indiana University Press.
- Humphrey, John H. (1986). Roman Circuses: Arenas for Chariot Racing. University of California Press.
- Kraemer, Rose Shepard (1992). Her Share of the Blessings: Women's Religions among Pagans, Jews, and Christians in the Greco-Roman World. Oxford University Press.
- Langlands, Rebecca (2006). Sexual Morality in Ancient Rome. Cambridge University Press.
- Miano, Daniele (2018). Fortuna: Deity and Concept in Archaic and Republican Italy. Oxford University Press.
- Palmer, Robert E. A. (1976). "The Vici Luccei in the Forum Boarium and Some Lucceii in Rome". Bullettino della Commissione Archeologica Comunale di Roma. 85: 135–161.
- Parker, Holt N. (2004). "Why Were the Vestals Virgins? Or the Chastity of Women and the Safety of the Roman State". American Journal of Philology. 125 (4): 563–601. JSTOR 1562224.
- Peralta, Dan-el Padilla (2023). Divine Institutions: Religions and Community in the Middle Roman Republic. Princeton University Press.
- Pasco-Pranger, Molly (2017). Founding the Year: Ovid's Fasti and the Poetics of the Roman Calendar. Brill. ISBN 9789047409595.
- Richardson, Lawrence (1992). A New Topographical Dictionary of Ancient Rome. Johns Hopkins University Press. ISBN 9780801843006.
- Salomies, Olli (2015). "The Roman Republic". In Bruun, Christer; Edmondson, Jonathan (eds.). The Oxford Handbook of Roman Epigraphy. Oxford University Press. pp. 153–177.
- Scullard, H. H. (1981). Festivals and Ceremonies of the Roman Republic. Cornell University Press.
- Staples, Ariadne (1998). From Good Goddess to Vestal Virgins: Sex and Category in Roman Religion. Routledge.
- Strong, Anise K. (2016). Prostitutes and Matrons in the Roman World. Cambridge University Press.
- Versnel, H. S. (1992). "The Festival for Bona Dea and the Thesmophoria". Greece & Rome. 39 (1): 31–55.
- Wagenvoort, Hendrik (1980). Pietas: Selected Studies in Roman Religion. Brill.
- Wiseman, T. P. (2008). Unwritten Rome. University of Exeter Press. doi:10.2307/j.ctt5vjn65. ISBN 978-0-85989-823-2. JSTOR j.ctt5vjn65.
