= Marriage in ancient Rome =

Social institution in the classical Roman civilization

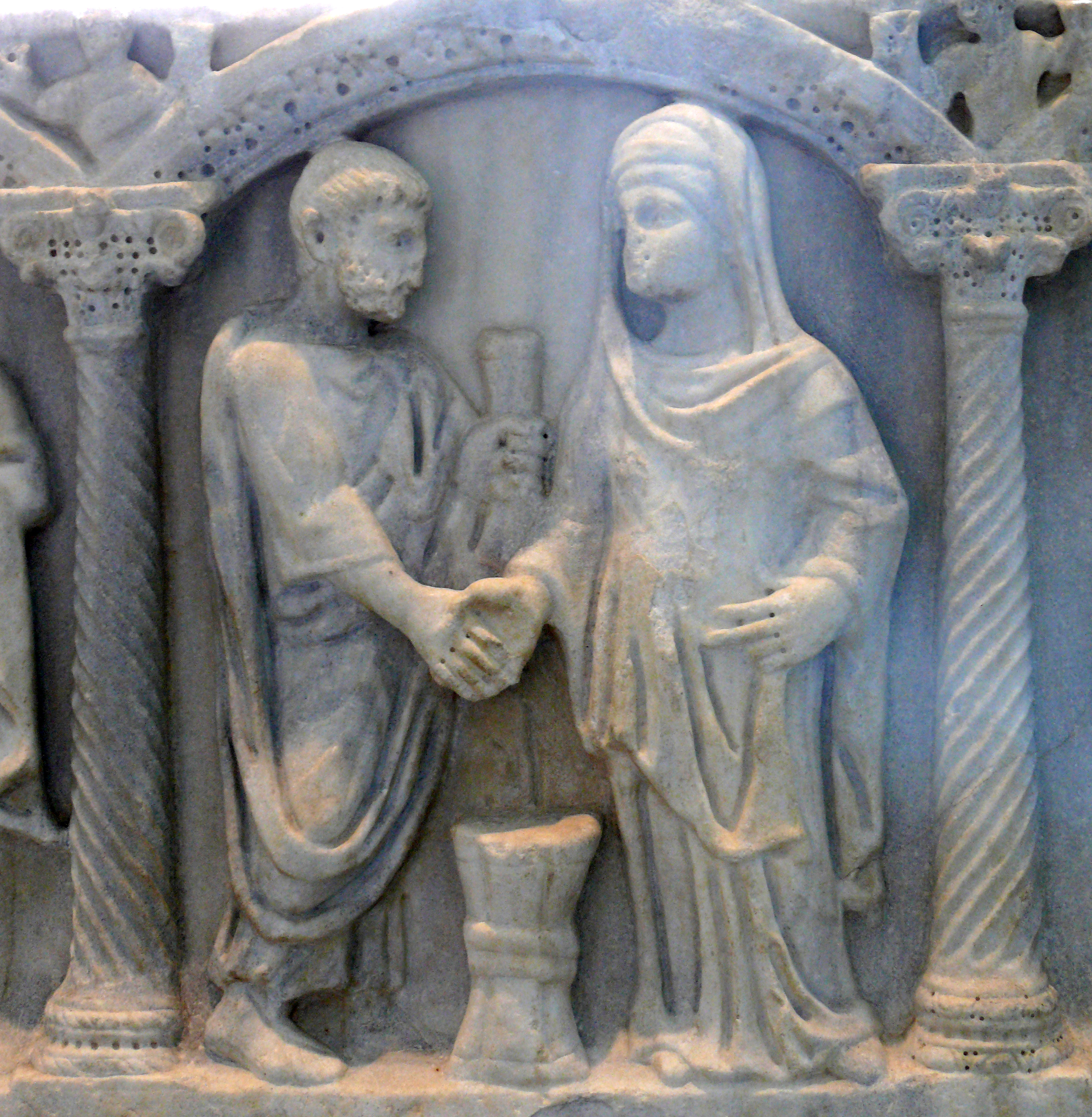
Roman couple joining hands (dextrarum iunctio); the bride's belt may show the knot symbolizing that the husband was "belted and bound" to her, which he was to untie in their bed (4th century sarcophagus)

Marriage (conubium) was a fundamental institution of society in ancient Rome and was used by Romans primarily as a tool for interfamilial alliances. The institution of Roman marriage was a practice of marital monogamy: Roman citizens could have only one spouse at a time in marriage but were allowed to divorce and remarry. This form of prescriptively monogamous marriage that co-existed with male resource polygyny (powerful men can have one wife and many other sexual partners) in Greco-Roman civilization may have arisen from the relative egalitarianism of democratic and republican city-states. Early Christianity embraced this ideal of monogamous marriage by adding its own teaching of sexual monogamy, and propagating it worldwide to become an essential element in many later Western cultures.

Roman marriage had precedents in myth. The abduction of the Sabine women may reflect the archaic custom of bride abduction. Rome's Sabine neighbours rejected overtures of intermarriage by Romulus and his band of male immigrants. According to Livy, Romulus and his men abducted the Sabine maidens but promised them honorable marriage, in which they would enjoy the benefits of property, citizenship, and children.

Marriages helped families to build economic and political bonds and alliances. Matrimonium, the root of the English word matrimony, defined the role of wives as mothers (matres) who would produce legitimate children, as eventual heirs to their parents' estates. The most ancient form of marriage, traditionally reserved to the patrician social class, claimed the husband's right to control his wife and her property. In later developments, the bride retained control over her dowry; the resources of both parties formed a heritable estate.

During the Republican era, marriage, divorce and adultery were matters dealt with by the families concerned. Falling marriage and birth rates in the Later Republic and early Empire led to state intervention. Adultery was made a crime, for which citizen-women could be punished by divorce, fines and demotion in social status; men's sexual activity was adultery only if committed with a married citizen-woman. Families were also offered financial incentives to have as many children as possible. Both interventions had minimal effect.

== Conventions of Roman marriage ==
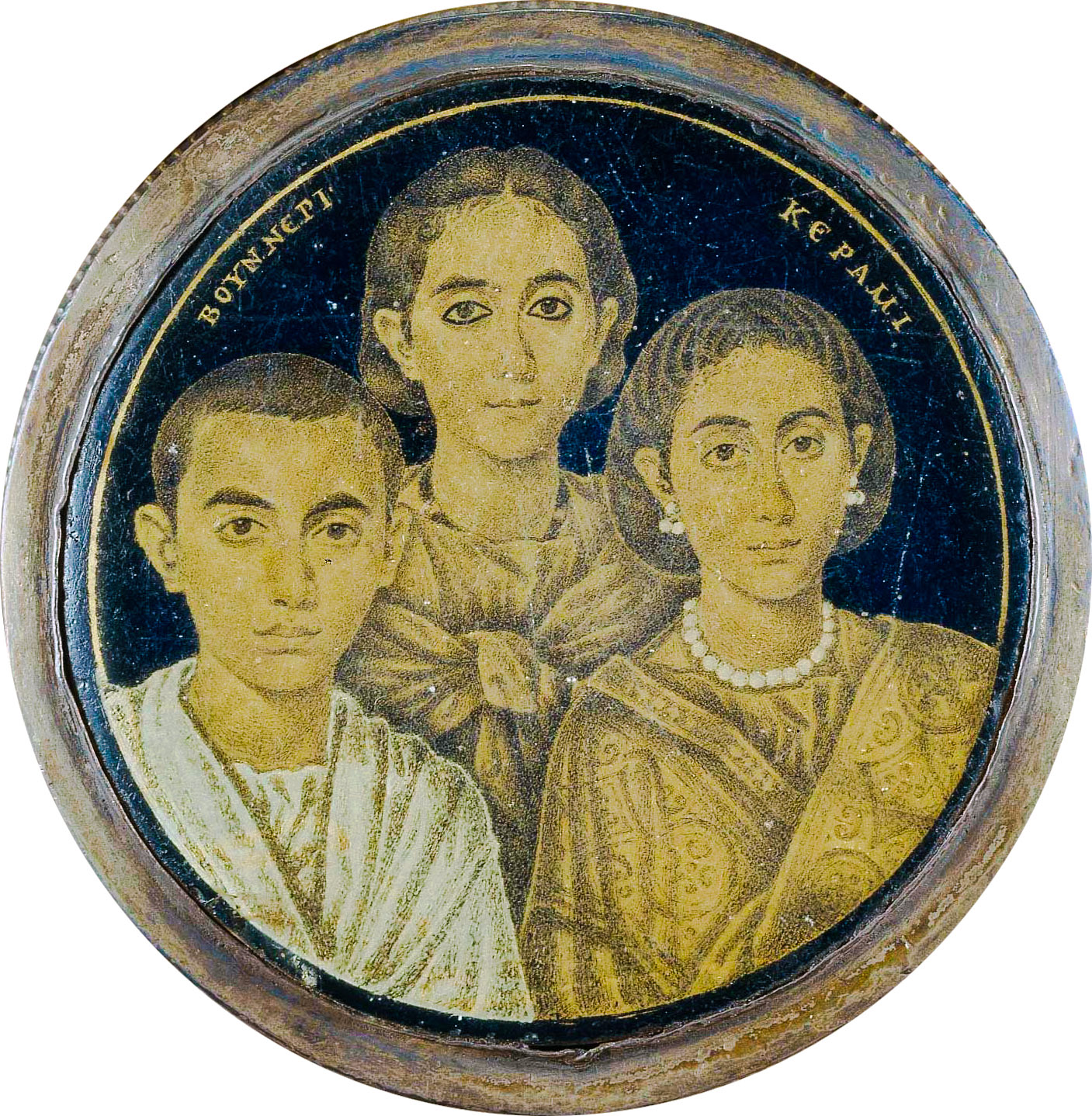
Detail of a gold glass medallion with a portrait of a family, from Alexandria (Roman Egypt), 3rd–4th century (Brescia, Museo di Santa Giulia)

Marriage (conubium) was one of the fundamental institutions of Roman society, as it joined not only two individuals but two families. The Romans considered marriage a partnership, whose primary purpose was to have legitimate descendants to whom property, status, and family qualities could be handed down through the generations.

The institution of marriage in ancient Rome was a strictly marital monogamy: under Roman law, a Roman citizen, whether male or female, could have only one spouse in marriage at a time but were allowed to divorce and remarry. The practice of marital monogamy that co-existed with male resource polygyny distinguished the Greeks and Romans from ancient civilizations in which elite males typically had multiple wives in the institution of marriage. Walter Scheidel believes that Greco-Roman monogamy in marriage may have arisen from the relative egalitarianism of the democratic and republican political systems of the city-states. The aspect of a marital monogamy was later embraced by early Christianity, which in turn perpetuated it with its own teaching of sexual monogamy as an ideal in later Western cultures. In the early fifth century Augustine referred to it as a "Roman custom".

Marriage had mythical precedents, starting with the abduction of the Sabine Women, which may reflect the archaic custom of bride abduction. Romulus and his band of male immigrants approached the Sabines for conubium, the legal right to intermarriage, from the Sabines. According to Livy, Romulus and his men abducted the Sabine maidens, but promised them an honorable marriage, in which they would enjoy the benefits of property, citizenship, and children.

Under Roman law, the oldest living male, the "father of the family" (pater familias), held absolute authority (patria potestas) over his children and, to a lesser extent, his wife. His household was thus understood to be under his manus (literally, "hand"). He had the right and duty to seek a good and valuable match for his children and might arrange a child's betrothal long before they came of age. To further the interests of their birth families, sons of the elite should follow their fathers into public life, and daughters should marry into respectable families. If a daughter could prove the proposed husband to be of bad character, she could legitimately refuse the match.

The age of lawful consent to a marriage was 12 for girls and 14 for boys. Most Roman women married in their early teens to young men in their twenties.

Roman mores idealized a married daughter's relationship to her father as deferential and obedient, even at her husband's expense. "Deference" was not always absolute. After arranging his daughter's first two marriages, Marcus Tullius Cicero disapproved – rightly, as it turned out – of her choice to marry Publius Cornelius Dolabella, but found himself unable to prevent it. A daughter kept her own birth-family name (nomen) for life, and although children usually took the father's name, some might take their mother's family name as part of theirs. In the early Empire, the legal standing of daughters differed little, if at all, from that of sons; either could inherit a share of the family estate if their father died intestate.

=== Marriage laws ===
Early Roman law recognized three kinds of marriage: confarreatio, symbolized by the sharing of spelt bread (panis farreus); coemptio, "by purchase"; and by usus (habitual cohabitation). Patricians always married by confarreatio, while plebeians married by coemptio or usus: in the latter, a woman could avoid her husband's legal control simply by being absent from their shared home for three consecutive nights once a year. Among elite families of the early Republic, manus marriage was the norm; the bride passed from the manus ("hand") of her father to the manus of her husband, remaining under one or another form of male potestas (power).

Manus marriage was an institutionally unequal relationship. By the time of Julius Caesar, it was largely abandoned in favor of "free" marriage, when a wife moved into her husband's home, she remained under her father's lawful authority, but she did not conduct her daily life under his direct scrutiny, and her husband had no legal power over her. This was one of the factors in the independence Roman women enjoyed, relative to many other ancient cultures and up to the modern period: Free marriage usually involved two citizens of equal or near-equal status, or a citizen and a person who held Latin rights. In the later Imperial period and with official permission, soldier-citizens and non-citizens could marry in law. So total was the law's separation of property that gifts between spouses were recognized as conditional loans; if a couple divorced or even lived apart, the giver could reclaim the gift.

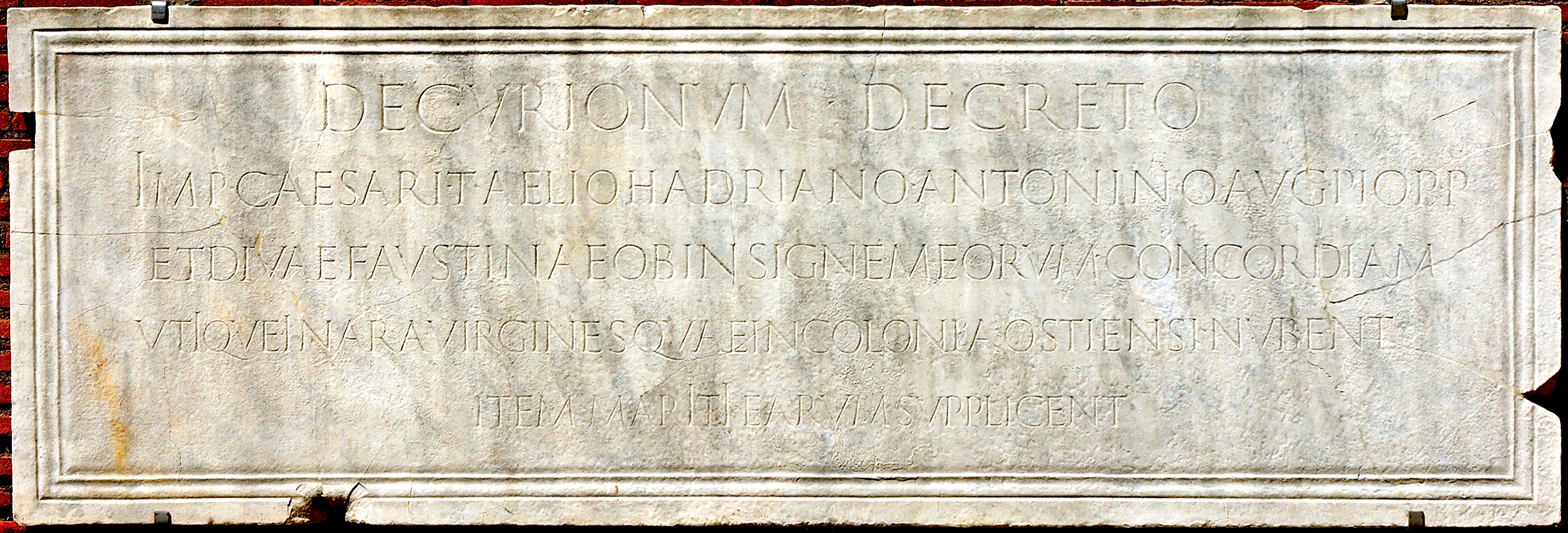
Inscription (CIL 14.5326) from Ostia Antica recording a decree that newlyweds are to pray and sacrifice before the altar to the imperial couple Antoninus Pius and Faustina as exemplifying Concordia, marital harmony

Following the collapse of the Republic, laws about marriage, parenting, and adultery were part of Augustus' program to restore the mos maiorum (traditional social norms) while consolidating his power as princeps and pater familias of the Roman state. Marriage and remarriage had become less frequent, and the citizen birth rate had fallen, particularly among the wealthier, more leisured classes. Augustan law on marriage and family life encouraged marriage, having children, and punished adultery as a crime. The new legislation formalized and enforced what had been considered a traditional, moral duty to family and the State; all men between 25 and 60 years of age, and all women between 20 and 50 were to marry and have children, or pay extra tax in proportion to their wealth. Members of the upper classes thus had most to lose. Citizens who had already produced three children, and freed persons who had produced four, were exempt. Marriages between senators, freed women, enslaved people and citizens were declared legally void. Children born to such liaisons were illegitimate, non-citizen and unable to inherit. A married woman who bore three children or more could be granted legal independence under the ius liberorum. These laws were poorly received; they were modified in 9 AD by the Lex Papia Poppaea; eventually, they were nearly all repealed or fell into disuse under Constantine and later emperors, including Justinian.

Roman citizen women could have only one sexual partner at a time but allowed divorce and remarriage. In the case of Roman citizen men, it is not clear whether the condition that a man is not able to have a concubine at the time that he has a wife pre-dates or post-dates the Constantinian law; ie., whether concubinage existed concurrently with marriage for men in Ancient Rome has been debated in modern scholarship and the evidence is inconclusive: it was not until the sixth century CE, after centuries of Christian influence, that the emperor Justinian claimed that “ancient law” prohibited husbands from keeping wives and concubines at the same time. According to Walter Scheidel, conditions in the Ancient Rome are best defined as prescriptively monogamous marriage that co-existed with male resource polygyny; powerful men had a principal wife and several secondary sexual partners. A married man's sexual activities with slaves, prostitutes, or other women of low status were not, in legal terms, adultery, and he could not be prosecuted under Augustus Laws. Under the adultery law, married man would only be committing adultery if his lover were someone else's wife.

=== Wedding ceremonies ===
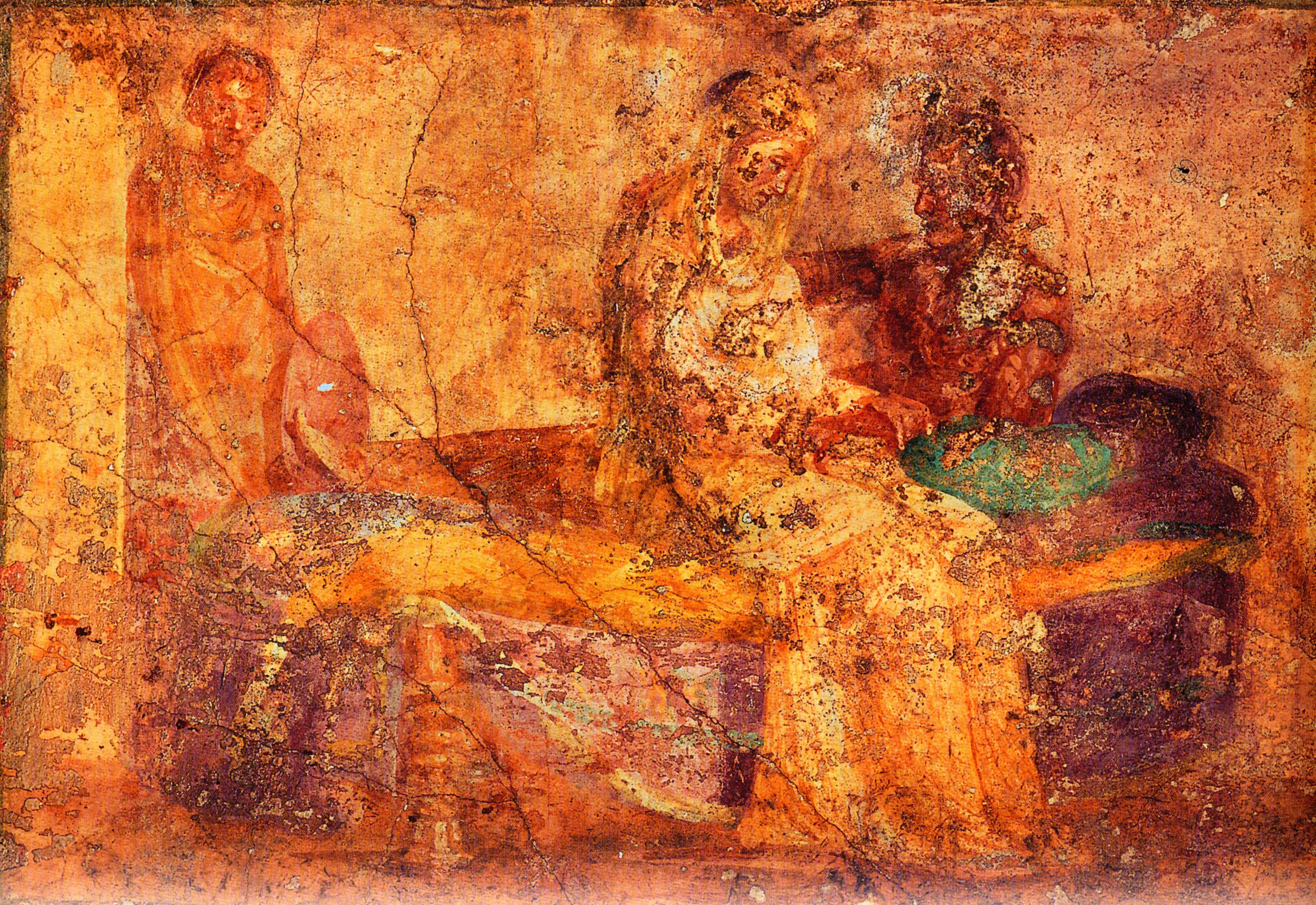
A groom encourages his demure bride while a servant looks on; wall painting, Casa della Farnesina in Rome (c. 19 BC)

A confarreatio wedding ceremony was a rare event reserved for the highest echelons of Rome's elite. The Flamen Dialis and pontifex maximus presided, with ten witnesses present, and the bride and bridegroom shared a cake of spelt (in Latin far or panis farreus), hence the rite's name. A more typical upper-middle class wedding in the classical period was less prestigious than a confarreatio, but could be equally lavish. It would have been carefully planned. Sometimes the bride and groom exchanged gifts before the wedding.

The lighting of a sacred torch in honor of Ceres was part of the celebration, intended to impart fertility upon the couple. A wedding sacrifice was also offered, with a sow being the most likely choice. The day after the wedding, the husband would hold a dinner party, and the bride made an offering to the Lares and other domestic deities of her new home.

=== Dowry ===
Dowry (Latin dos, a gift) was the payment made by a wife's family to her husband nominally to cover their household expenses. It was more customary than compulsory. Ancient papyrus texts show that dowries typically included land and enslaved people but could also include jewelry, toiletries, mirrors, and clothing.

While a marriage lasted, the dowry was the husband's property, but his use was restricted; if the marriage ended through divorce, it was returned to either the wife or her family. If the husband committed offenses which led to divorce, he lost claim to any share in the dowry. If a wife was blameless for the ending of her marriage, the dowry was restored to her. If a wife or husband with children initiated a divorce, their partner could claim a share of the dowry on behalf of the children to meet their needs and later inheritance.

A dowry of dos recepticia was one in which agreements were made in advance about its disposal and recovery. A dowry of dos profecticia was given by the bride's father or her pater familias; it could be recovered by the donor or by the divorced woman herself. A dowry of dos adventicia was more flexible; it might be given by the wife, though it came from her father and used to settle a debt incurred by the husband. If she divorced, a wife could reclaim this dowry; if she died, the husband kept it.

=== Divorce ===
Lawful divorce was relatively informal; the wife took back her dowry and left her husband's house. Roman men had always held the right to divorce their wives; a pater familias could order the divorce of any couple under his manus. According to the historian Valerius Maximus, divorces were taking place by 604 BC or earlier, and the early Republican law code of the Twelve Tables provided for it. Divorce was socially acceptable if carried out within social norms (mos maiorum). By the time of Cicero and Julius Caesar, divorce was relatively common and "shame-free", the subject of gossip rather than a social disgrace. Valerius says that Lucius Annius was disapproved of because he divorced his wife without consulting his friends; that is, he undertook the action for his purposes and without considering its effects on his social network (amicitia and clientela). The censors of 307 BC thus expelled him from the Senate for moral turpitude.

However, elsewhere, it is claimed that the first divorce occurred only in 230 BC. At which time, Dionysius of Halicarnassus notes that "Spurius Carvilius, a man of distinction, was the first to divorce his wife" on the grounds of infertility. This was most likely the Spurius Carvilius Maximus Ruga who was consul in 234 and 228 BC. The evidence is confusing. A man could also divorce his wife for adultery, drunkenness, or making copies of the household keys. Around the 2nd century, married women gained the right to divorce their husbands.

Divorce by either party severed the lawful family alliance that had been formed through the marriage, and remarriage might create an entirely new set of economically or politically beneficial partnerships. Among the elite, husbands and wives might remarry several times. Only one spouse's will was required for any divorce, even if the divorced party was not informed. A spouse who had entered marriage sane and healthy but became incapable of sound judgment (insane) was incompetent and could not divorce their partner; they could be divorced without their knowledge or legal notice. Divorce, like marriage, was considered a family affair. It was discussed and agreed upon in private, in an informal family gathering of the parties most affected; the husband, wife, and senior members of both families. No public record was kept of the proceedings. Official registration of divorce was not required until 449 AD.

=== Remarriage ===
The frequency of remarriage among the elite was high. Speedy remarriage was not unusual, and perhaps even customary, for aristocratic Romans after the death of a spouse. While no formal waiting period was dictated for a widower, it was customary for a woman to remain in mourning for ten months before remarrying. The duration may allow for pregnancy: if a woman had become pregnant just before her husband's death, the period of ten months ensures that no question of paternity, which might affect the child's social status and inheritance, would attach to the birth. No law prohibited pregnant women from marrying, and there are well-known instances: Augustus married Livia when she was carrying her former husband's child, and the College of Pontiffs ruled that it was permissible as long as the child's father was determined first. Livia's previous husband even attended the wedding.

Because elite marriages often occurred for reasons of politics or property, a widow or divorcée with assets in these areas faced few obstacles to remarrying. She was far more likely to be legally emancipated than a first-time bride and to have a say in the choice of husband. The marriages of Fulvia, who commanded troops during the last civil war of the Republic and who was the first Roman woman to have her face on a coin, are thought to indicate her political sympathies and ambitions: she was married first to the popularist champion Clodius Pulcher, who was murdered in the street after a long feud with Cicero; then to Scribonius Curio, a figure of less ideological certitude who at the time of his death had come over to Julius Caesar; and finally to Mark Antony, the last opponent to the republican oligarchs and to Rome's future first emperor.

Most wives were encouraged to remarry after the husband's death or after a divorce; and a high death rate, low average life expectancy, and high divorce rate meant frequent or multiple remarriages. Since children were expected in marriage, each spouse usually brought at least one child to the new union. Remarriages thus created a unique blending of the family in ancient Roman society, where children were influenced by stepparents and some instances where stepmothers were younger than their stepchildren. Ancient physicians believed that a woman was liable to get very sick if she was deprived of sexual activity and it could even lead to a woman getting "hysteric uterine constriction". Even legislation passed during the rule of Augustus required widows and widowers to remarry to inherit from people outside of their immediate family.

=== Adultery ===
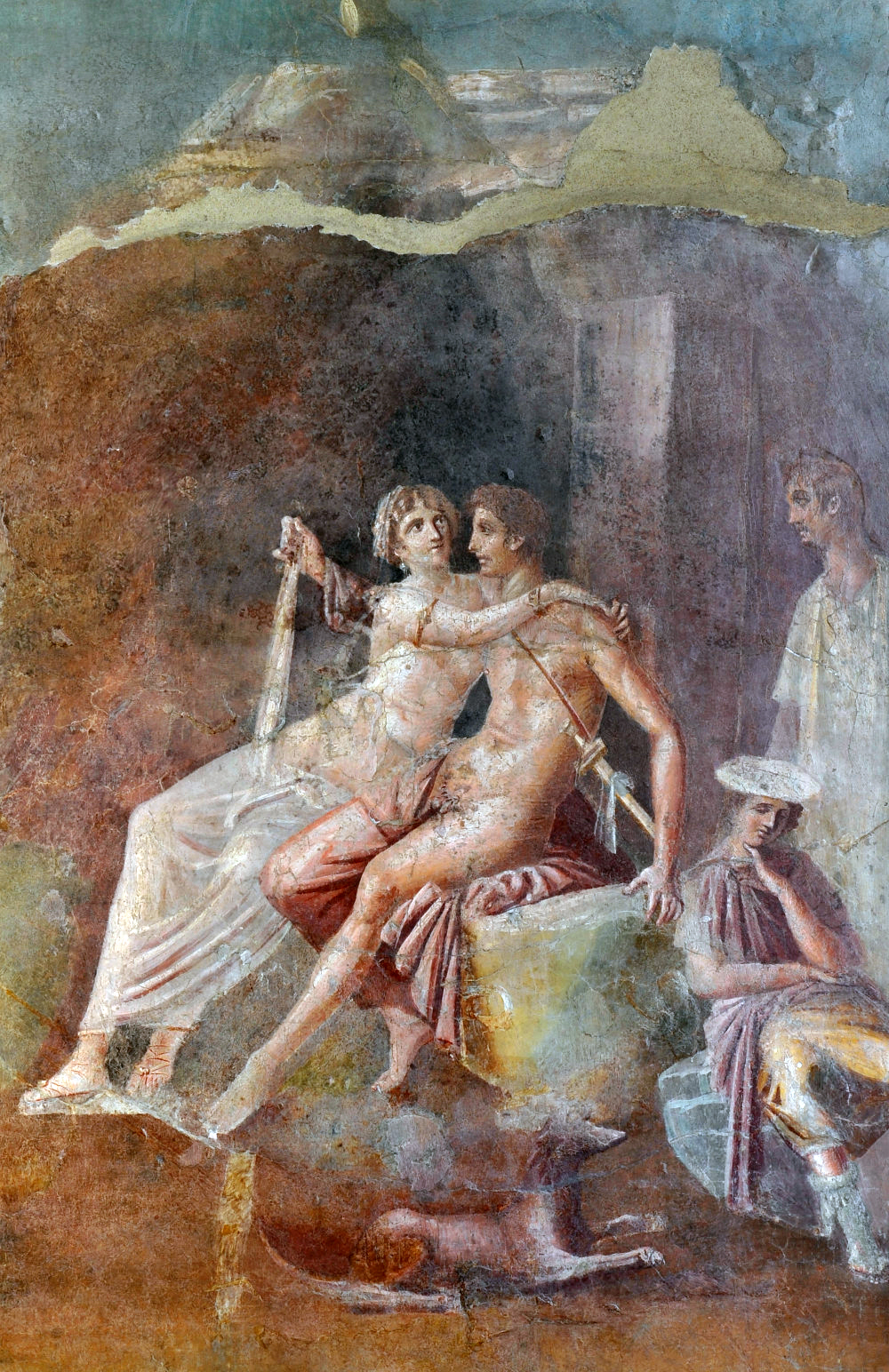
Dido embracing Aeneas, from a Roman fresco in the House of Citharist in Pompeii, Italy; Pompeian Third Style (10 BC – 45 AD)

Adultery was a sexual offense committed by a man with a woman who was neither his wife nor a permissible partner, such as a prostitute or enslaved person. A married man committed adultery mainly when his female partner was another man's wife or unmarried daughter. The punishment varied at different periods of Roman history and depending on the circumstances.

Although prohibitions against adultery and harsh punishments were mentioned during the Republic (509–27 BC), historical sources suggest that they were regarded as archaic survivals and should not be interpreted as accurate representations of behavior. Adultery was normally considered a private matter for families to deal with, not a severe criminal offense requiring the attention of the courts, though there were some cases when adultery and sexual transgressions by women had been brought to the aediles for judgment. According to Cato (2nd century BC), a husband had an ancient right (ius) to kill his wife if he caught her in the act of adultery. The existence of this "right" has been questioned; if it did exist, it was a matter of custom and not statute law and probably only applied to those in the manus form of marriage, which had become vanishingly rare by the Late Republic (147–27 BC), when a married woman always remained legally a part of her own family. No source records the justified killing of a woman for adultery by either a father or husband during the Republic. Adultery was sufficient grounds for divorce, however, and if the wife was at fault, the wronged husband got to keep a portion of her dowry, though not much more than if he had repudiated her for less severe forms of misconduct.

As part of the moral legislation of Augustus in 18 BC, the Lex Iulia de adulteriis ("Julian Law concerning acts of adultery") was directed at punishing married women who engaged in extra-marital affairs. The implementation of punishment was the responsibility of the paterfamilias, the male head of household to whose legal and moral authority the adulterous party was subject. If a father discovered that his married daughter was committing adultery in either his own house or the house of his son-in-law, he was entitled to kill both the woman and her lover; if he killed only one of the adulterers, he could be charged with murder. While advertising the father's power, the extremity of the sentence seems to have led to its judicious implementation, since cases in which this sentence was carried out are infrequently recorded – most notoriously, by Augustus himself against his daughter.

A wronged husband was entitled to kill his wife's lover if the man were either enslaved or infamis, a person who was perhaps technically free and excluded from the standard legal protections extended to Roman citizens. Among the infames were convicted criminals, entertainers such as actors and dancers, prostitutes and pimps, and gladiators. He was not allowed to kill his wife, who was not under his legal authority. However, if he chose to kill the lover, the husband was required to divorce his wife within three days and to have her formally charged with adultery. If a husband was aware of the affair and did nothing, he could be accused of pandering (lenocinium, from leno, "pimp").

If no death penalty was carried out and adultery charges were brought, both the married woman and her lover were subject to criminal penalties, usually including the confiscation of one-half of the adulterer's property, along with one-third of the woman's property and half her dowry; any property brought by a wife to the marriage or gained during marriage typically remained in her possession following a divorce. A woman convicted of adultery was barred from remarrying.

Scholars have often assumed that the Lex Iulia was meant to address a virulent outbreak of adultery in the Late Republic. An androcentric perspective in the early 20th century held that the Lex Iulia had been "a very necessary check upon the growing independence and recklessness of women." A gynocentric view in the late 20th to early 21st century saw love affairs as a way for the intelligent, independent women of the elite to form emotionally meaningful relationships outside marriages arranged for political purposes. It is possible, however, that no such epidemic of adultery even existed; the law should perhaps be understood not as addressing a real problem that threatened society but as one of the instruments of social control exercised by Augustus that cast the state and, by extension, himself, in the role of paterfamilias to all Rome. Humiliating or violent punishments for adultery are prescribed by law and described by poets. Still, they are absent in the works of Roman historians or the letters of Cicero: "The men who people the pages of Cicero and Tacitus do not burst into their wives' bedrooms to take violent revenge (even when license was granted by the law)." Augustus himself, however, had frequent recourse to his moral laws in choosing to banish potential enemies and rivals from Rome, and the effect of the legislation seems to have been primarily political.

== Same-sex marriage ==
In the Imperial era, there are several references to same-sex weddings between male partners. While these weddings were generally treated with mockery in literary sources such as Martial, Juvenal, and imperial biographers, the feelings of the participants are not recorded. There is no evidence to contradict an interpretation that the men were expressing a meaningful commitment; even so, a quasi-marital union between two men would not have been a valid marriage (iustum matrimonium) in Roman law.

Sporus, a young enslaved man (amasius), was castrated and treated like Nero's wife. A dowry was given, and the marriage ceremony was a public affair. Sporus is frequently portrayed as looking like Nero's late second wife, but the wedding could have served as a theatrical performance for the emperor following the passing of his wife rather than an actual wedding. Nero also may have had a legitimate husband named Pythagoras; Tacitus (Annals 15.37) briefly discusses Nero's marriage ceremony with him, in which the emperor supposedly took the role of the bride.

In Juvenal's second satire, two men have a homosexual relationship, with one man taking the woman's role and wearing the bridal garb. Phaedrus' description of the creation of men has been repeatedly utilized to argue the conception of female same-sex relationships. Frequently illustrated is a couple with one appearing more masculine while the other is more feminine. However, whether this reflected a contemporary practice or was merely a work of fiction is uncertain.

Among notable examples of same-sex unions in Rome are those of the emperor Elagabalus, who is said to have married either an enslaved chariot driver named Hierocles or a Smyrnaean athlete named Zoticus; according to Cassius Dio, in these relationships Elagabalus was named wife, mistress, and queen. It is unlikely Elagabalus legitimately married.

There is evidence of same-sex weddings from the constitutio of Constantine and Constans in the Codex Theodosianus. The Codex refers to a man marrying in the manner of a bride. The text found within the Codex Theodosianus can allude to the references to a homosexual relationship and its representation of marital binding. The legal process of prohibiting a wedding ceremony between two men is clearly illustrated in the imperial constitutio, which justifies that weddings took place in ancient Roman society.

== See also ==
- Ancient Greek wedding customs
- Concubinatus
- Contubernium
- Sexuality in ancient Rome
- Weddings in ancient Rome

== Bibliography ==
- Edwards, Catharine (1993). The Politics of Immorality in Ancient Rome. Cambridge University Press.
- Evans Grubbs, Judith (2002). Women and the Law in the Roman Empire. doi:10.4324/9780203442524. ISBN 978-1-134-74393-3.
- Gardner, Jane F. (1991). Women in Roman Law and Society. Indiana University Press. ISBN 0-253-20635-9.
- Lefkowitz, Mary R.; Fant, Maureen B. (2005). Women's Life in Greece and Rome. Baltimore: Johns Hopkins University Press. ISBN 0-8018-4474-6.
- Nussbaum, Martha C. (2002). "The Incomplete Feminism of Musonius Rufus, Platonist, Stoic, and Roman". The Sleep of Reason: Erotic Experience and Sexual Ethics in Ancient Greece and Rome. University of Chicago Press.
- Stocquart, Emile (March 1907). Sherman, Charles Phineas (ed.). "Marriage in Roman law". Yale Law Journal. 16 (5). Translated by Bierkan, Andrew T.: 303–327. doi:10.2307/785389. JSTOR 785389.
- Treggiari, Susan (1981). "Contubernales". Phoenix. 35 (1). CAC: 42–69. doi:10.2307/1087137. JSTOR 1087137.
- Rawson, Beryl (1974). "Roman Concubinage and Other De Facto Marriages". Transactions of the American Philological Association. 104. JHUP: 279–305. doi:10.2307/2936094. JSTOR 2936094.
