= Dea Viriplaca =

Goddess in Roman religion

Dea Viriplaca ("Husband-Pleasing Goddess") was an ancient Roman goddess who mediated in troubled marriages. Married couples went to her shrine to seek reconciliation.

Amy Richlin characterized this goddess's religious service as "a sort of couples counseling – one-sided, judging by her name." The husband and wife took turns speaking about what conflict had been bothering them. Once they had unburdened themselves, they could return to a more agreeable state of mind. Dea Viriplaca's functions are thus comparable to Fortuna Virilis in her man-pleasing aspect, and to Venus Obsequens and Venus Verticordia as goddesses who encouraged good marital relations. Unlike many other marriage-promoting rites for women only, but like the Matronalia, the services of Dea Viriplaca required the participation of men.

The shrine (sacellum) was located on the Palatine Hill. Valerius Maximus writes of it as existing in his own time (the reign of Tiberius) but considers it among the instituta antiqua, an institution of the old days.

== Sources ==
- Denzey, Nicola (2007). The Bone Gatherers: The Lost Worlds of Early Christian Women. Beacon.
- Dolansky, Fanny (2011). "Reconsidering the Matronalia and Women's Rites". Classical World. 104 (2): 191–209. doi:10.1353/clw.2011.0024. JSTOR 25799995.
- Richardson, Lawrence, Jr. (1992). A New Topographical Dictionary of Ancient Rome. Johns Hopkins University Press. ISBN 9780801843006.
- Richlin, Amy (2014). Arguments with Silence: Writing the History of Roman Women. University of Michigan Press.
