= Judith Evans Grubbs =

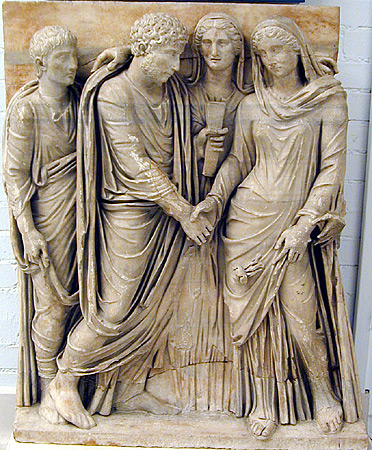
Marble fragment from the front of a sarcophagus showing a Roman marriage ceremony. Dates to the second century CE, Rome. Held by the British Museum.

Judith Evans Grubbs is the Betty Gage Holland Professor Emerita of Roman History. She is an expert on Roman imperial history, Roman law, women and the family, and late antiquity.

== Education ==
Evans Grubbs was awarded a B.A. in Greek and English from Emory University in 1978. She received her PhD in classics from Stanford University in 1987. Her doctoral thesis was "Munita coniugia": The Emperor Constantine's Legislation on Marriage and the Family. She was awarded a Guggenheim Fellowship in 2012.

== Career ==
Evans Grubbs has written two significant books on Roman law: Law and Family in Late Antiquity: The Emperor Constantine's Marriage Legislation (Clarendon Press, 1995) and Women and the Law in the Roman Empire: A Sourcebook on Marriage, Divorce, and Widowhood (Routledge, 2002). Her work has been described as 'a model of a systematic unraveling of the dialectics between law, society, daily practice, and the making of Christian institutions and ideologies, in which we can begin to understand some of the complex inter-relationships amongst them'. In her review of Evans Grubbs' Women and the Law, Jill Harries situates the work as following Jane Gardner's ground-breaking work on Women in Roman Law and Society (1986). On her retirement from Emory in 2023, Jinyu Liu succeeded her as the Betty Gage Holland Professor of Roman History.

Evans Grubbs has twice received a National Endowment for the Humanities Fellowship (1997 and 2004), and she was the Jesse Ball duPont Fellow at the National Humanities Center, 1993–1994. She will give the Annual Lecture for the Journal Gender & History on 21 October 2026.
