= Jinyu Liu =

Chinese classicist and academic

Academic background
- Education: Nanjing University; Columbia University
- Thesis: (2004)

Academic work
- Discipline: Classics; Roman History
- Institutions: DePauw University; Emory University

Jinyu Liu (Chinese: 刘津瑜) is the Betty Gage Holland Professor of Roman History at the Department of History of Emory University. She was a professor of classics at DePauw University, and has been a distinguished guest professor at Shanghai Normal University. She is an expert in Roman history, social history, translation, the reception of Graeco-Roman classics in China, and Latin epigraphy.

== Early life and education ==
Liu was born and raised in China. She received her BA in 1993 and her MA in 1996 from Nanjing University where she studied Greek and Roman history, and Chinese literature and history. She received her PhD from Columbia University in 2004. Her thesis was entitled Occupation, Social Organization, and Public Service in the collegia centonariorum.

== Career ==
Liu began employment at DePauw University in 2004 as assistant professor in the Department of Classical Studies. She moved to Emory University in 2023, succeeding Judith Evans Grubbs as the Betty Gage Holland Professor of Roman History.

Liu holds a distinguished guest professorship at Shanghai Normal University (2014–). Liu was a keynote speaker at the 2020 annual meeting of the Association of Ancient Historians. She delivered the Clack Lecture at the 2020 annual meeting of the Classical Association of the Atlantic States. She was a recipient of a Mellon New Directions Fellowship in 2011-2014. She is a Member of the School of Historical Studies at the Institute for Advanced Study, Princeton, in Fall 2025.

== Books ==
- Collegia Centonariorum: the Guilds of Textile Dealers in the Roman West (Leiden: Brill, 2009), ISBN 9789004177741
- A Research Guide to the Study of Roman History (in Chinese) (Beijing: Peking University Press, 1st ed, 2014; 2nd ed, 2021) (review, in Chinese)
- New Frontiers of Research on Ovid in a Global Context (2 volumes), (Beijing: Peking University Press, 2021) ISBN 9787301321737 and ISBN 9787301322093
- (ed. with Thomas J. Sienkewicz) Ovid in China. Reception, Translation, and Comparison (Leiden: Brill, 2022) ISBN 9789004467279
- (ed. with R. Blanton IV and Agnes Choi), Taxation, Economy, and Revolt in Ancient Rome, Galilee, and Egypt (Routledge, 2022) ISBN 9781032264226
