= Marriage in ancient Greece =

Marriage, unions and partnerships in ancient Greece

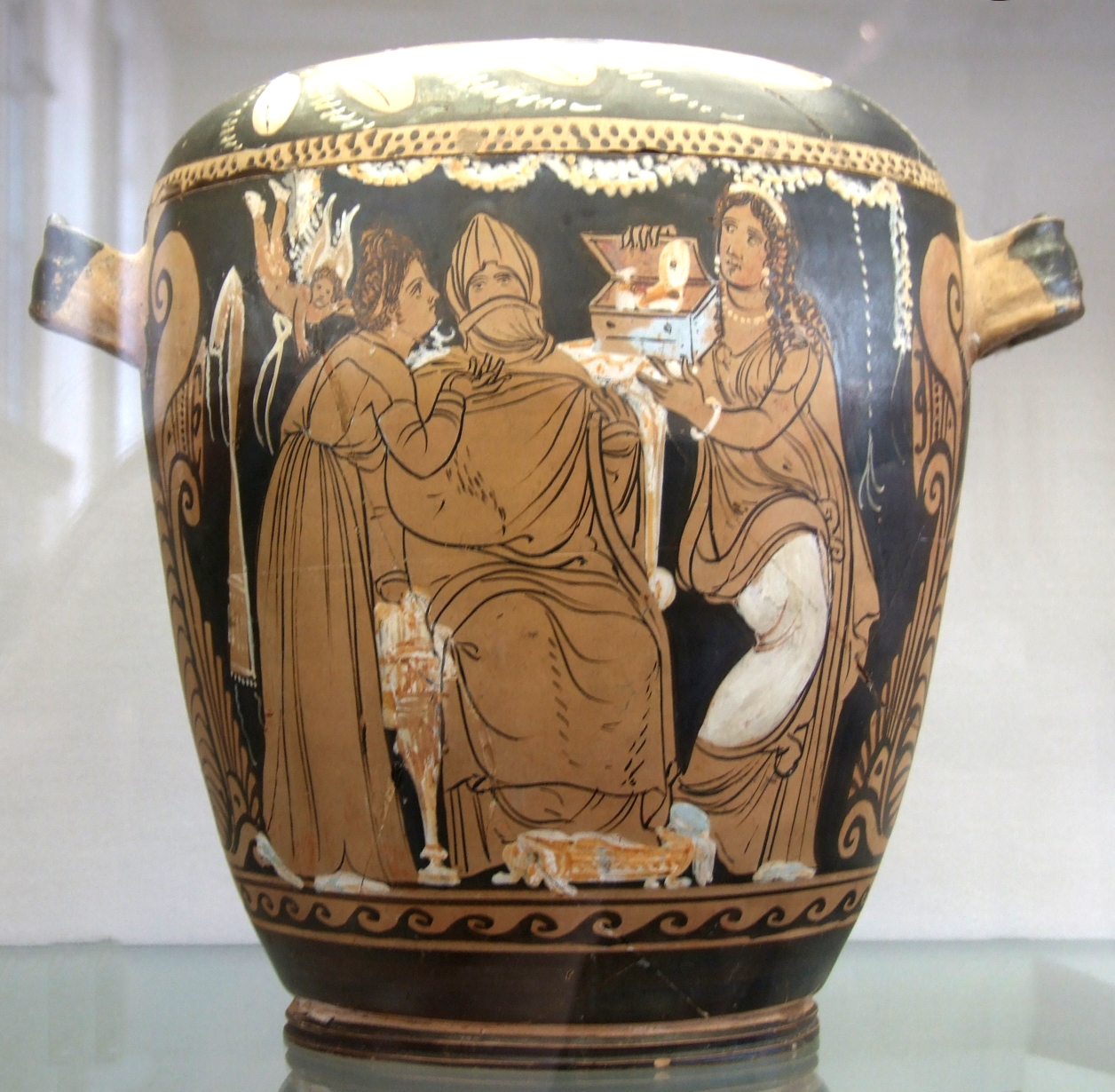
"Wedding preparation"

Marriage in ancient Greece had less of a basis in personal relationships and more in social responsibility. However the available historical records on the subject focus exclusively on Athens or Sparta and primarily on the aristocratic class. According to these records, the goal and focus of all marriages was intended to be reproduction, making marriage an issue of public interest. Marriages were usually arranged by the parents; on occasion professional matchmakers were used. Each city was politically independent and each had its own laws concerning marriage. For the marriage to be legal, the woman's father or guardian gave permission to a suitable man who could afford to marry. Daughters were usually married to uncles or cousins. Wintertime marriages were popular due to the significance of that time to Hera, the goddess of marriage. The couple participated in a ceremony which included rituals such as veil removal, but it was the couple living together that made the marriage legal. Marriage was understood to be the official transition from childhood into adulthood for women.

Scholars are uncertain whether these traditions were common throughout the rest of Ancient Greece and for those in lower classes or if these records are unique to these regions and social classes. These records are also primarily focused during the classical period. There is also limited information available about marriage in the city of Gortyn in ancient times, in the form of the legal text the Gortyn code.

== Marriage as a public interest ==
The ancient Greek legislators considered marriage to be a matter of public interest. Marriages were intended to be monogamous. In keeping with this idea, the heroes of Homer never have more than one wife by law, though they may be depicted with living with concubines, or having sexual relationships with one or more women. In Plato's Laws, the would-be lawgiver suggests that any man who was not married by age 35 should be punished with a loss of civil rights and with financial consequences. He proposes that when choosing a wife, men should always consider the interests of the state over their own desires.

=== In Ancient Sparta ===
In Ancient Sparta, the subordination of private interests and personal happiness to the good of the public was strongly encouraged by the laws of the city. One example of the legal importance of marriage can be found in the laws of Lycurgus of Sparta, which required that criminal proceedings be taken against those who married too late (graphe opsigamiou) or unsuitably (graphe kakogamiou), as well as against confirmed bachelors, that is, against those who did not marry at all (graphe agamiou). These regulations were founded on the generally recognised principle that it was the duty of every citizen to raise up strong and healthy legitimate children to the state.

The Spartans considered teknopoiia (childbearing) as the main object of marriage. Because of this, whenever a woman had no children by her own husband, the state ought to allow her to live with another man. On the same principle, and to prevent the end of the family line, Spartan King Anaxandridas II was allowed to live with two wives. He kept two separate establishments: this was a case of bigamy, which, as Herodotus observes, was not at all consistent with Spartan nor indeed with Hellenic customs. The offspring were required by the government to be strong and healthy, otherwise, the parents would leave and abandon the child.

=== In Ancient Athens ===
For a marriage to be viewed as legitimate in Athens, both the bride and groom had to be of free status, and after 451 BC, both had to be legitimate children of Athenian citizen families. Children of such unions would then be considered legitimate Athenian citizens when they came of age. Though the marriages were not legally recognized in Athens, wealthy metics would be considered married by those around them if they followed the same procedures and ceremonies. These couples would then act as any married Athenian couple would.

=== In Ancient Gortyn ===
The Gortyn Code gives information on the law surrounding marriage in ancient Gortyn. Though the code records the law, scholar Sue Blundell reminds us we should not assume that this reflects a consistently held practice. The code seems to mostly address legality of marriages to consider the citizenship and political status of any children. Citizenship of the children of slave men and free women depended on where the children lived. Children were considered slaves if the couple lived and raised the children in the house of their father, making them property of his master. If the couple lived and raised children in the house of their mother they were considered free. Children born to two slave parents would be owned by their master.

== Arranged marriage ==
Marriage was usually arranged between the parents of the bride and the groom. A man would choose his wife based on three things: the dowry, which was given by the father of the bride to the groom; her presumed fertility; and her skills, such as weaving. There were usually no established age limits for marriage, although, with the exception of political marriages, waiting until childbearing age was considered proper decorum. Many girls were married by the age of 14 or 16, while men commonly married around the age of 30.

The son-in-law and father-in-law became allies (ἔται, etai, "clansmen") through the exchange of gifts in preparation for the transfer of the bride. Gifts (δῶρα dora) signified the alliance between the two households. The exchange also showed that the girl's family was not simply selling her or rejecting her; the gifts formalized the legitimacy of a marriage. Gifts from the betrothed wife (ἕδνα hedna) usually consisted of cattle.

A husband might have a wife and a concubine. If the wife gave consent, children bred from the concubine would be acknowledged as heirs to the husband. This practice was mainly confined to high status wealthy men, allowing them multiple concubines and mistresses but only one wife.

Marriages were also arranged through the meeting of the fathers of the young couple, basing the marriage on their interests in expanding a business or forging an alliance between the families, with little concern about what the groom thought of the situation, and no regard for what the wife wished.

== Selecting a spouse ==
Independent of any public considerations, there were also private or personal reasons (particular to the ancients) which made marriage an obligation. Plato mentions one of these as the duty incumbent upon every individual to provide for a continuance of representatives to succeed himself as ministers of the Divinity (toi Theoi hyperetas an' hautou paradidonai). Another was the desire felt by almost everyone, not merely to perpetuate his own name, but also to prevent his heritage being desolate, and his name being cut off, and to leave someone who might make the customary offerings at his grave. With this in mind, childless persons would sometimes adopt unwanted children, including children who had been left to die.

By Athenian law, a citizen was not allowed to marry a foreign woman, nor conversely, under very severe penalties. However, proximity by blood (anchisteia), or consanguinity (syngeneia), was not, with few exceptions, a bar to marriage in any part of Greece; direct lineal descent was. Thus, brothers were permitted to marry even with sisters, if not homometrioi or born from the same mother, as Cimon did with Elpinice, though a connection of this sort appears to have been looked on with abhorrence.

There is no evidence to suggest that love ever played a significant role in selecting a legal spouse, though scholars have stated that it is likely there would have been affairs due to love.

== Heiresses ==
In Athens, in the case of a father dying intestate and without male children, his heiress had no choice in marriage. The woman was not an heiress by modern day Western standards, as she could not actually own the land, however, she could not be separated from it. This meant that any man would have to first marry her in order to own the land. She was compelled by law to marry her nearest kinsman, usually a first cousin or an uncle that was capable of fathering children. If either the heiress and/or her potential husband are married they were required to divorce, unless the father had taken the precaution of adopting his daughter's current husband as his heir before his death. Under Solon's reforms couples of this nature were required to have sex a minimum of three times per month in order to conceive a male heir. If the heiress were poor (thessa), the nearest unmarried kinsman either married her or portioned her suitably to her rank. When there were several co-heiresses, they were respectively married to their kinsmen, the nearest having the first choice (see Epikleros). In fact the heiress, together with her inheritance, belonged to the kinsmen of the family, so that in early times a father could not give his daughter (if an heiress) in marriage without their consent. This was not the case, however, in later Athenian law, by which a father was empowered to dispose of his daughter by will or otherwise; just as widows were disposed of in marriage by the will of their husbands, who were still considered their rightful guardians (kyrioi).

The same practice of marrying in the family (oikos), especially in the case of heiresses, prevailed in Sparta. These women were known as patrouchoi. Leonidas married the heiress of Cleomenes I, as her anchisteia, or next of kin, and Anaxandrides his own sister's daughter. Moreover, if a father had not determined himself concerning his daughter, the king's court decided who among the privileged persons or members of the same family should marry the heiress.

Lin Foxhall has cited evidence of a similar tradition in ancient Gortyn, where the women were known as patroiokoi. These girls would be married as young as 12 in order to produce an heir as quickly as possible. They could be claimed first by paternal uncles, and if there was no uncles to make the claim, then paternal cousins by order of age would have the next right to marry her. If still no one was able to claim her, she was free to marry who she pleased "of the tribe from those who apply". However, if she were to turn down the first claimant, she would owe him half of her inheritance.

== Dates for marriage ==
Ancient Greeks primarily married in winter, during the month of Gamelion, the equivalent of the month of January. Gamelion translates to "Wedding-Month". This was done in honour of the goddess of marriage, Hera. There were also special sacrifices made to her throughout the month.

== Engagement ==
Match-making among the ancients remained outside the dominion of political and legal regulation. This was entirely left to the care and forethought of parents, or women who made a profession of it, and who were therefore called promnestriai or promnestrides. The profession, however, does not seem to have been thought very honourable or to have been held in repute, as being too nearly connected with that of a panderer (proagogos).

In ancient Athens, marriages were arranged between the groom and the guardian (kyrios) of the bride. The kyrios would announce that he was allowing his daughter to marry. The suitors would compete against each other for the daughter's hand in marriage. They would bring extravagant gifts or compete by song, dance, or games. When the suitor was chosen for the daughter, the suitor and the father would proceed in a process known as engysis, ('giving of a pledge into the hand'), which is where the two men would shake hands and say some ritual phrases. The woman did not decide whom she would marry, only under very special circumstances, and she played no active role in the engysis process, which was not out of the norm for that time period. After the engysis, the two would make a binding promise, which occurred before the marriage.

In Athens, the engysis, or betrothal, was in fact indispensable to the complete validity of a marriage contract. It was made by the natural or legal guardian (kyrios) of the bride, usually her father, and attended by the relatives of both parties as witnesses. In view of this crowd the guardian would say "I give you my daughter to sow for the purpose of producing legitimate children." to which the intended groom would respond "I take her." The law of Athens ordained that all children born from a marriage legally contracted in this respect should be legal gnesioi, and consequently, if sons, isomoiroi, entitled to inherit equally or in gavel-kind. It would seem, therefore, that the issue of a marriage without espousals would lose their heritable rights, which depended on their being born ex astes kai engyetes gynaikos, that is, from a citizen and a legally betrothed wife. The wife's dowry was also settled at the espousals.

In Sparta, the betrothal of the bride by her father or guardian (kyrios) was requisite as a preliminary of marriage, just as at Athens. Another custom peculiar to the Spartans, and a relic of ancient times, was the seizure of the bride by her intended husband (see Herodotus, vi. 65), but of course with the sanction of her parents or guardians. She was not, however, immediately domiciled in her husband's house, but cohabited with him for some time clandestinely, till he brought her, and frequently her mother also, to his home. A similar custom appears to have prevailed in Crete, where, as we are told, the young men when dismissed from the agela of their fellows were immediately married, but did not take their wives home till some time afterwards. Muller suggests that the children of this furtive intercourse were called parthenioi.

== Marriage celebration ==
The ancient Greek marriage celebration consisted of a three part ceremony which lasted three days: the proaulia, which was the pre-wedding ceremony, the gamos, which was the actual wedding, and the epaulia, which was the post-wedding ceremony. Most of the wedding was focused on the experience of the bride. In Athens specifically, most of the wedding would take place at night.

=== Proaulia ===
The proaulia was the time when the bride would spend her last days with her mother, female relatives, and friends preparing for her wedding. The proaulia was usually a feast held at the bride's father's house. During this ceremony, the bride would make various offerings, called the proteleia, to gods such as Artemis, Athena, and Aphrodite. "Toys would be dedicated to Artemis by adolescent girls prior to marriage, as a prelude to finding a husband and having children. More significant as a rite of passage before marriage was the ritual of the cutting and dedication of a lock of hair." It is also likely that she would have offered the girdle worn since puberty to these goddesses. These offerings signified the bride's separation from childhood and initiation into adulthood. They also established a bond between the bride and the gods, who provided protection for the bride during this transition.

=== Gamos ===
The gamos was the wedding day, where a series of ceremonies surrounded the transfer of the bride from her father's home to that of her new husband. It started with a sacrifice, proteleia, (premarital), which was for the gods to bless the two being wed. The day's rituals began with a nuptial bath which was given to the bride. This bath symbolized purification as well as fertility, and the water would have been delivered from a special location or type of container called the loutrophoros. The bride and groom then made offerings at the temple to ensure a fruitful future life. A wedding feast at the home of the father of the bride would be attended by both families. However, men and women sat at different tables, the women would sit and wait until the men were done. The most significant ritual of the wedding day was the anakalypteria, which was the removal of the bride's veil. This signified the completion of the transfer to her husband's family.

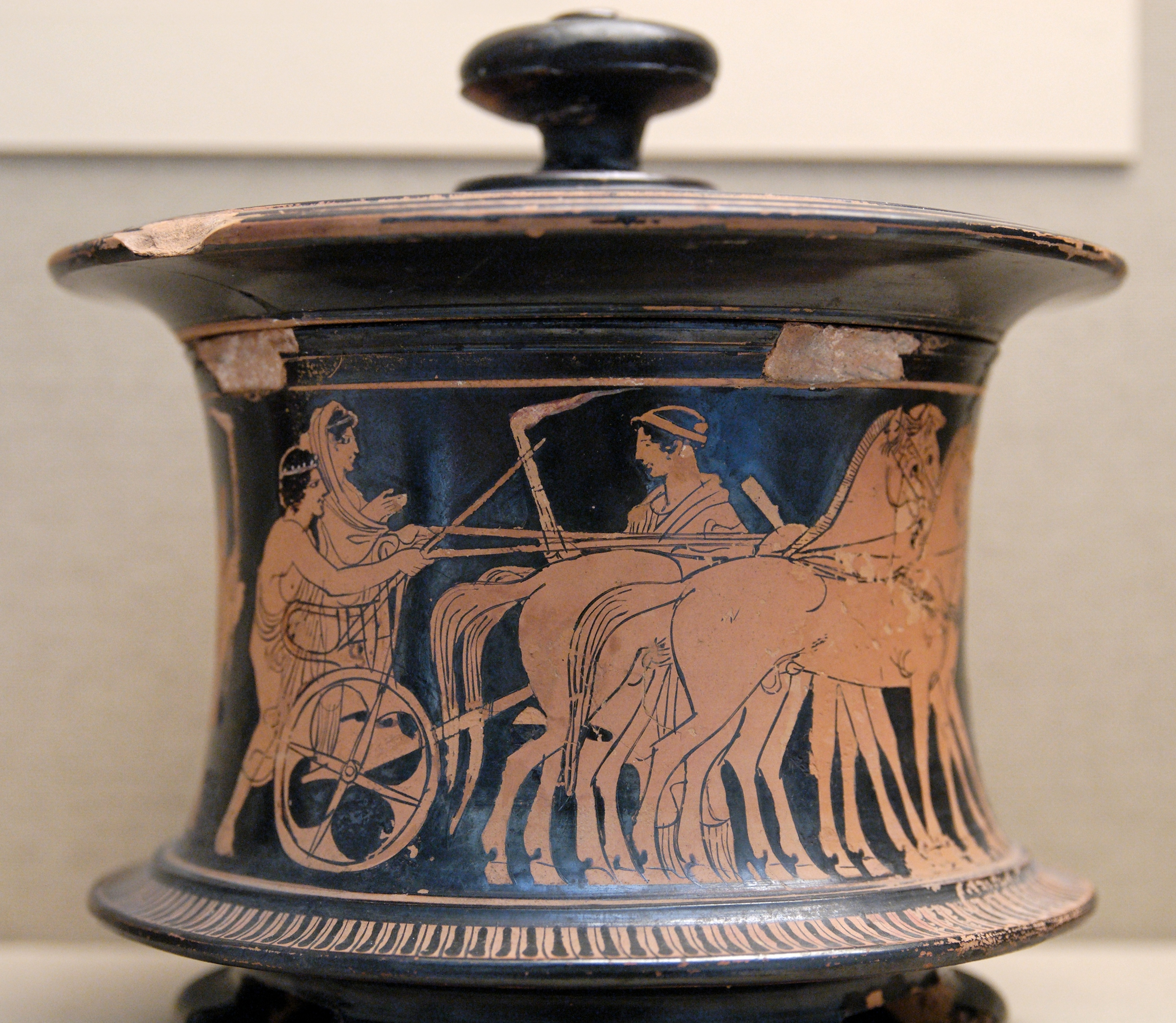
Vase Painting of Wedding Procession

The woman consecrated the marriage by moving into the suitors living quarters. Once the woman stepped in the house the συνοικεῖν (synoikein, 'living together'), legalized the engysis that the suitor and the kyrios made. The day after the marriage it was typical for the friends of the bride to visit the new home. Though the reason is unknown, it is thought this may have been to ease the transition into their new life.

The most important part was the marriage procession; a chariot driven by the groom bringing the still-veiled bride to his, and now her, home. They would be followed by relatives bringing gifts to the couple. The entire path would be lit by torches. The gifts given would often be painted with romantic images of marriage and newlyweds. It is likely that these images were chosen to ease the brides fear of her marriage to a man who would have often been a stranger. Upon arriving at the home they would be greeted by the mother-in-law and brought directly to the hearth of the home. At this point the couple would have been showered with dried fruits and nuts in order to bless them with fertility and prosperity. It was at this point where the groom would lead the bride to the bridal chamber and her veil would be ritually removed.

=== Epaulia ===
The epaulia took place on the day following the gamos. This is when the gifts were presented by the relatives of the couple and formally carried into the house. The gifts often were to reference the new sexual and domestic role of the wife. Some common gifts were jewelry, garments, perfume, pots, and furniture.

=== Spartan marriage ===
Spartan marriage lacked the ceremony of Athens. Spartan women would be willfully captured and dressed as a man, also having her hair shaved as a man would. In this attire the bride would be laid alone in the dark where a sober groom would sneak in, remove her belt, and carry her to bed. As men were required to sleep in the barracks, he would leave shortly after. This process of sneaking in would continue nightly. The bride would help this process by planning when and where it was safe for them to meet. Sometimes this process would continue for so long that couples would have children before meeting in the daylight. It is also likely that Spartan women were not married as young as Athenian women, as Spartans wanted a bride to be in her prime with a developed body, not of a slight or immature frame. In the average marriage Spartan brides were most likely around 18, grooms around 25. There is no evidence to suggest if the consent of the families was obtained before this type of marriage, but as far as sources suggest it was accepted by all Spartans.

=== Gortyn Marriage ===
Little is known about marriage ceremonies in ancient Gortyn, but some evidence suggests that brides may have been quite young, and would still live in their father's house until they could manage their husband's household.

== Married life ==
=== In Ancient Athens ===
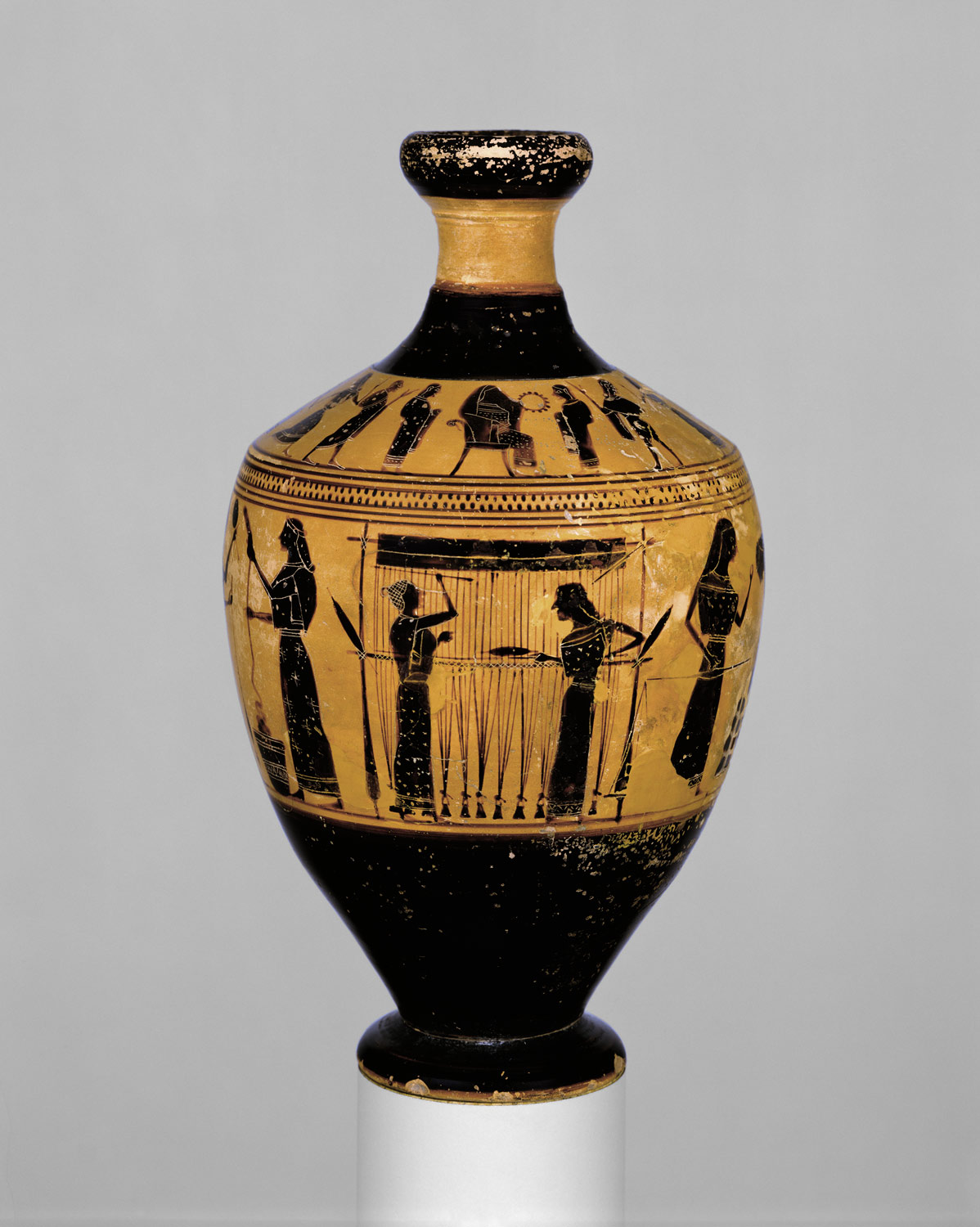
Black-Figure vase painting of women engaged in wool-working

Once married, domestic life began. The domestic space and duties were divided by male and female. The women would have their space upstairs, and the men downstairs. This was to keep the women out of sight when any visitors or strangers were present in the space. Any entertainment would also happen in the men's quarters so as to make sure the women were hidden. It is thought that this seclusion of women may also have acted as a status symbol, as it was only wealthy families who could afford to have the space and staff to keep their women entirely secluded. The seclusion of women also guarantees the legitimacy to any children the woman has. In the women's space both free and slave women would mix company, working together to produce textiles. Weaving and producing textiles were considered an incredibly important task for women, and they would often offer particularly fine works to the gods. If the women wished to work outside on warm days they were able to do so in an interior courtyard. It was also important for women to be able to oversee the tasks of the household and slaves in the absence of her husband. A husband would 'train' his wife to do this properly, as men could potentially be gone for long periods of time to deal with concerns of either democratic or military importance.

=== In Ancient Sparta ===
Regardless of being married, Spartan men continued to live in the barracks until age thirty in times of both peace and war. This separation of husband and wife was thought to keep their relationship passionate, as opportunities for intercourse were scarce. It was thought that children conceived from the passion this separation fostered would be more energetic and vigorous than the average child. The only goal of Spartan marriage was reproduction, and there were many cases of agreements being made for children to be conceived outside of just the husband and wife. If a husband was very old he may choose a young man to impregnate his wife on his behalf. All of these measures were taken to ensure the children were as impressive as possible, and superior to non-Spartan children. Spartan wives could not work to earn money, and were expected to support themselves from the land assigned to them that was worked by slaves or lower class workers. It is not certain if women were assigned land themselves, or oversaw the land assigned to their husbands. Spartan women would not mourn the deaths of husbands or sons who died in war, but rather take pride in their brave acts and heroic death.

=== In Ancient Gortyn ===
Though the Gortyn code gives limited information on married life in Gortyn, there is some evidence that women had more independence under the law than in places such as Athens or Sparta, though they were still not significant in comparison to the legal rights of men. Foxhall has stated that this law being in place however does not mean it was necessarily common practice. The laws also did not necessarily exist for the good of women or contribute to the overall well-being of women. Husbands and wives shared the income from their joint estates, but the woman kept sole control over her own property.

=== Unmarried women ===
It is unknown how common it was for women to remain unmarried in ancient Greece, as single women would not have been of interest for male historians to write about. There are lines in Lysistrata by Aristophanes which allude to sadness the women of Athens have for women who have aged and are now unable to have legitimate children due to men having been gone so long to fight the Peloponnesian War. Unmarried women would have been financially dependent on their nearest male family member. If her family was poor, this may have caused the woman to turn to sex work in order to support herself.

== Divorce ==
According to scholars, divorce did not seem to be looked down upon in ancient Greece. Any negative reputation attributed to divorce would have been due to related scandals rather than the divorce itself. In ancient Athens, both husband and wife had the power to initiate a divorce. The husband simply had to send his wife back to her father to end the marriage. For the wife to obtain a divorce, she had to appear before the archon. Though divorces instigated by the wife would have had to have been registered with the archon, he did not seem to have the power to make any decision regarding it, and would simply take record of it. The wife would likely also have needed the support of her father and family. The wife was financially protected by laws which declared her dowry was to be returned in cases of divorce. There were two additional procedures by which people other than the couple could dissolve a marriage. The first of these was divorce initiated by the father of the bride; the only example of this procedure to have survived comes from Demosthenes' speech Against Spudias. This was only permitted if the wife had not borne her husband a child. Finally, if a woman became epikleros after her marriage, her closest male relative on her father's death was expected to end both his and her current marriage in order to marry her.

In cases where a woman was found to have committed adultery, the husband was obliged to divorce his wife under threat of disenfranchisement. It has been suggested that in some cases, in order to avoid scandal, husbands may not have strictly followed this law, however. Upon divorce, a husband was required to pay back his wife's dowry. If he did not, he was liable to pay 18% interest annually on it.

At Sparta, barrenness on the part of a wife seems to have been a ground for dismissal by the husband.

In Gortyn, either husband or wife had the ability to divorce the other. When initiated by the husband he owed his wife a small financial compensation. Divorced wives kept their property, half of the crops from their own property, and half of what they had woven.

Another common reason for marriages to end was if someone was widowed. Women were often made widows when their husbands died in war, men commonly became widowers as a result of death during childbirth. It was common for those who were divorced or widowed to be remarried.

== See also ==
- Gynaeceum
- Women in Classical Athens
- Women in ancient Sparta
