= Vinalia =

Festivals in honour of Jupiter and Venus

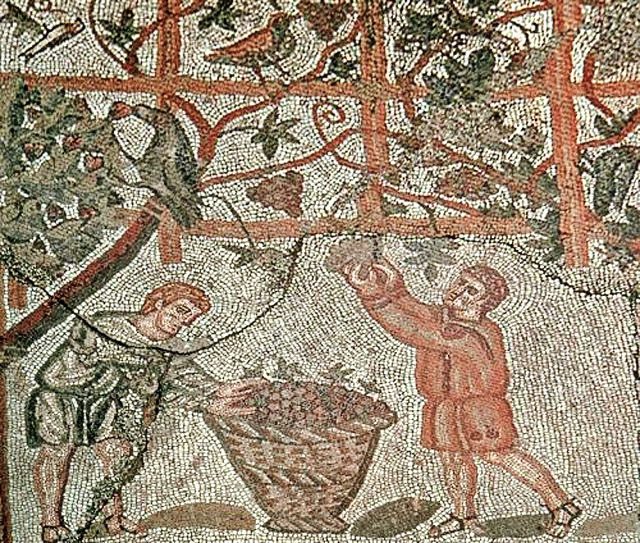
- Mosaic depicting the vintage (from Cherchell, present-day Algeria, Roman Africa)
- Observed by: Roman Republic, Roman Empire
- Type: Classical Roman religion
- Observances: Libations of wine
- Date: 23 April (Urbana); 19 August (Rustica)
- Related to: Jupiter and Venus

The Vinalia /vɪˈneɪliə/ were Roman festivals of the wine harvest, wine vintage and gardens, held in honour of Jupiter and Venus. The Vinalia prima ("first Vinalia"), also known as the Vinalia urbana ("Urban Vinalia") was held on 23 April to bless and sample last year's wine and ask for good weather until the next harvest. The Vinalia rustica ("Rustic Vinalia") was on 19 August, before the harvest and grape-pressing.

== Vinalia Urbana ==
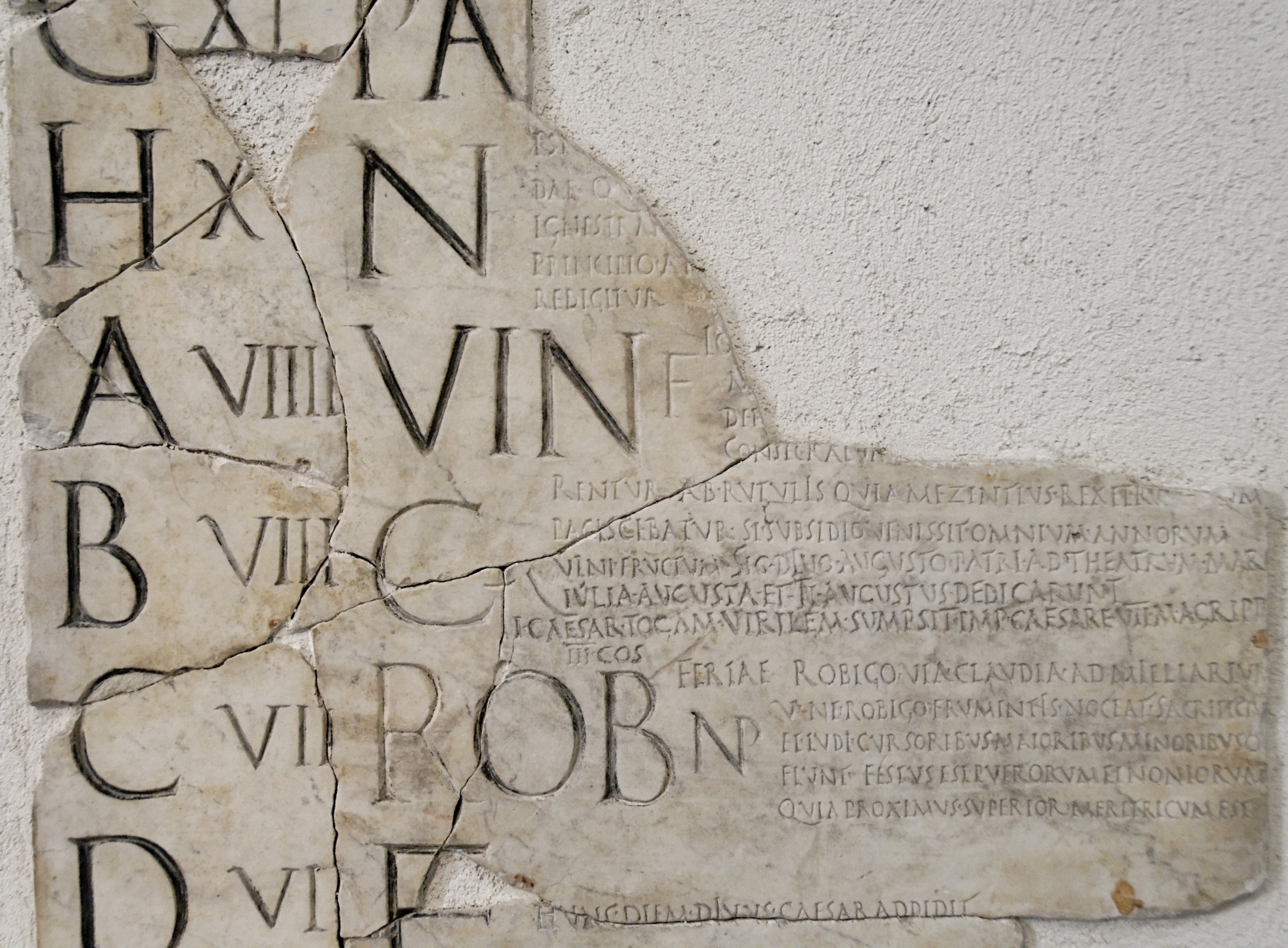
Fragment of the Fasti Praenestini showing the April Vinalia (VIN)

The Vinalia Urbana was held on 23 April. It was predominantly a wine festival, shared by Venus as patron of "profane" wine (vinum spurcum) intended for everyday human use, and Jupiter as patron of the strongest, purest, sacrificial grade wine (temetum). In honour of Venus, whose powers had provided humankind with ordinary wine, men and women alike sampled the vinum spurcum of the previous autumn's pressing. As god of the weather on which the wine-harvest depended, Jupiter was offered a special libation of the previous year's sacred wine vintage, blessed by his high priest and poured into a ditch outside Venus' Capitoline temple, probably under the gaze of Rome's higher echelons. Common girls (vulgares puellae) and prostitutes (meretrices) gathered at Venus Erycina's Colline temple – probably on separate occasions, for propriety's sake – to offer the goddess myrtle, mint, and rushes concealed in rose-bunches. In return, they asked her for "beauty and popular favour", and to be made "charming and witty".

== Vinalia Rustica ==
The Vinalia Rustica was held on 19 August. It was originally a rustic Latin harvest festival, celebrating the grape harvest, vegetable growth and fertility. At the Roman Vinalia Rustica, kitchen gardens and market-gardens, and presumably vineyards were dedicated to Venus Obsequens, the earliest form of Venus to receive a temple at Rome. In Roman mythology, it marked the fulfillment of a vow by the ancient Latin allies of Rome's legendary ancestor Aeneas, who promised all wine of the next sacred vintage to Jupiter, in return for victory against the Etruscan tyrant Mezentius. According to some sources, the warlike Mezentius had claimed this vintage as his due, not Jupiter's. Roman opinions differ on which deity presided at the Vinalia Rustica; Varro insists that like the Vinalia Urbana, it was sacred to Jupiter, who controlled the weather that governed the growing and ripening of grapes; moreover Jupiter's priest picked the first bunch of grapes, blessed the first sacred pressing and offered a sacrifice; these observations are borne out by Pliny the Elder. In practice, however, the festival had strong popular and cult connections to Venus as patron goddess of ordinary, religiously "impure" wine (vinum spurcum). Some of the rites took place at her various temples. The sacrificial victim offered by Jupiter's priest, a female lamb (agna) may be evidence if not of Venus herself, then of an ancient, rustic Latin goddess very much like her. An account of the origins and rise of this festival is given by Festus.
