= Against Spudias =

Oration by Demosthenes

"Against Spudias" (Ancient Greek: Πρὸς Σπουδίαν ὑπὲρ Προικός, romanized: Pros Spoudian hyper Proikos) was an oration composed by Demosthenes which concerned the division of the estate of Polyeuctes. It is the forty-first in the corpus of Demosthenic speeches which have been preserved. Modern commentators have sometimes considered that this was one of Demosthenes' earlier speeches, based on its simplicity and similarity to the speeches he made on his own inheritance.

The speech is particularly interesting to scholars because it shows that the actions of women differed significantly from historians' usual views of Athenian expectations surrounding women's behaviour. It also contains the only example in classical Athenian oratory of the father of the bride initiating a divorce.

The matter at issue in the case is a series of financial transactions between Polyeuctes and his wife, Spudias and his wife, and the plaintiff and his wife. Spudias and the plaintiff were the sons-in-law of Polyeuctes, and on his death they both brought suits against one another over the handling of the estate.

John Miles argues that the case put forward by the plaintiff in Against Spudias was weak, and he probably lost the case.

== See also ==
- Women in Classical Athens
