= Jane F. Gardner =

British historian (1934–2023)

- Born: 1934
- Died: 28 January 2023 (aged 88)
- Occupation: Ancient historian

Academic background
- Education: University of Glasgow; University of Oxford

Academic work
- Institutions: University of Reading; Cardiff University; Ure Museum of Greek Archaeology
- Main interests: Roman history; Roman law; women in ancient Rome

Jane F. Gardner (10 March 1934 – 28 January 2023) was a British Roman historian, academic, and museum curator. She was emerita professor of Roman History at University of Reading, specialising in Roman law and Roman social history. She was a professor at the university from 1993 until her retirement in 1999, having taught there since 1963. She was curator of the Ure Museum of Greek Archaeology from 1976 to 1992.

== Early life and education ==
Gardner was born in Glasgow on 10 March 1934 to a mixed Protestant-Catholic working-class family: her father, who had left school at 12, worked for the London, Midland and Scottish Railway while her mother (who had no secondary education) looked after their family. While at school, Gardner won first prize in Glasgow's Hutcheson Trust Bursary examination; she later won a Ferguson Fellowship to study Classics at the University of Glasgow, where she matriculated in 1951. She was awarded the Cowan Blackstone Medal in 1953, and graduated with a first-class MA in 1955. From there she went on to study for a second degree in Literae Humaniores (Classics) at Lady Margaret Hall, Oxford, graduating in 1962 with a double first.

== Career ==
From 1962 to 1963 Gardner taught Greek and Roman History at University College, Cardiff (now Cardiff University), followed by two years teaching Classics and English at Forest Fields Grammar School in Nottingham; she also taught Classics at Kendrick Girls School in Reading.

Gardner joined the Classics Department at the University of Reading in 1963, at first as a part-time lecturer. Over the following 36 years she was promoted several times, becoming assistant lecturer in 1964, lecturer in 1966, senior lecturer in 1988 and finally professor in 1993. In that time she held a Leverhulme Trust Research fellowship (1995–96) and was also curator of the Ure Museum of Greek Archaeology (1976–92).

Between 1976 and 1979, Gardner was a member of the Council of the Society for the Promotion of Roman Studies.

== Research ==
Gardner's research focused primarily on Roman economic and social history, especially the use of Roman law in historical research and the legal and economic history of Roman women; she published extensively on the Roman family, Roman property law, the legal status of individuals, and the role of slaves and freedmen in Roman society, and her research has been described as "ground-breaking" in its wide-ranging use of sources, including inscriptions and papyri as well as literary texts. Her three "landmark" monographs Women in Roman Law and Society (1986), Being a Roman Citizen (1993) and Family and Familia in Roman Law and Life (1998) have had a significant impact on the fields of Roman legal and social history. Reviewers praised these books for presenting often difficult and complicated legal material in readable and accessible ways. These monographs remain the most important works on their subjects.

Gardner also produced a revised translation of Julius Caesar's Gallic War (1983), as well as a new translation of his Civil War (1976). According to an obituary, these two Penguin translations, along with other publications such as Roman Myths (part of the British Museum's Legendary Past series, 1993), represent Gardner's "great commitment to the dissemination of Classical scholarship beyond the confines of academia and the field in a narrow sense", as did her role as a volunteer lecturer in Greek and Classics at the Working Men's College in Camden from 1979 to 1981.

== Later life and death ==
Gardner retired and became an emerita professor in 1999, shortly after receiving an honorary D.Litt. from the University of Oxford. For three years after her retirement (until 2002) she was special professor at the University of Nottingham, helping to develop the International Centre for the History of Slavery (now the Institute for the Study of Slavery). She continued to write and publish on Roman law and society, especially on slavery, and continued to review books in The Classical Review.

Gardner died on 28 January 2023, at the age of 88.

== Selected publications ==
- Gardner, Jane F. 1986. Women in Roman Law and Society. Croom Helm
- Gardner, Jane F., Weidemann T. 1991. The Roman Household: a Sourcebook. Routledge
- Gardner, Jane F. 1993. Being a Roman Citizen. Routledge
- Gardner, Jane F. 1998. Family and Familia in Roman Law and Life. Clarendon Press
- Weidemann, T., Gardner, Jane F. 2002 Representing the Body of the Slave. Frank Cass
