= Terminus (god) =

Roman god, protector of boundary markers

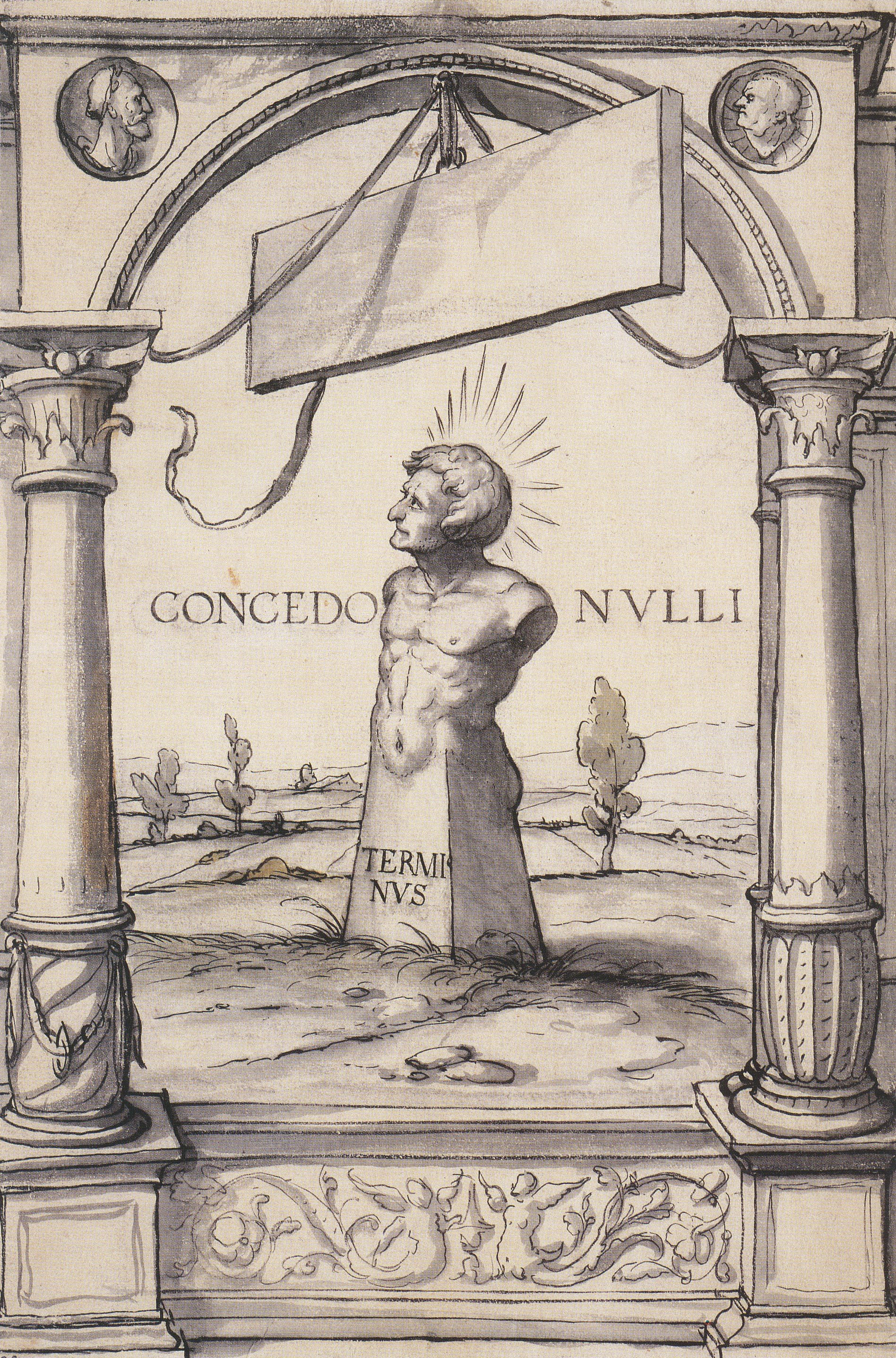
Terminus is often pictured as a bust on a boundary stone, here the concedo nvlli or concedo nulli means "I yield to no one".

In Roman religion, Terminus was the god who protected boundary markers; his name was the Latin word for such a marker. Sacrifices were performed to sanctify each boundary stone, and landowners celebrated a festival called the "Terminalia" in Terminus's honor each year on February 23. The Temple of Jupiter Optimus Maximus on the Capitoline Hill was thought to have been built over a shrine to Terminus, and he was occasionally identified as an aspect of Jupiter under the name "Jupiter Terminalis".

Ancient writers believed that the worship of Terminus had been introduced to Rome during the reign of the first king Romulus (traditionally 753–717 BC) or his successor Numa (717–673 BC). Modern scholars have variously seen it as the survival of an early animistic reverence for the power inherent in the boundary marker, or as the Roman development of proto-Indo-European belief in a god concerned with the division of property.

== Worship ==
The name of the god Terminus was the Latin word for a boundary stone, and his worship as recorded in the late Republic and Empire centred on this stone, with which the god could be identified. Siculus Flaccus, a writer on land surveying, records the ritual by which the stone was sanctified: the bones, ashes, and blood of a sacrificial victim, along with crops, honeycombs, and wine, were placed into a hole at a point where estates converged, and the stone was driven in on top. On February 23 annually, a festival called the Terminalia was celebrated in Terminus's honor, involving practices which can be regarded as a reflection or "yearly renewal" of this foundational ritual. Neighboring families would garland their respective sides of the marker and make offerings to Terminus at an altar—Ovid identifies these, again, as crops, honeycombs, and wine. The marker itself would be drenched in the blood of a sacrificed lamb or pig. There followed a communal feast and hymns in praise of Terminus.

These rites were practised by private landowners, but there were also related public ceremonies. Ovid refers to the sacrifice of a sheep on the day of the Terminalia at the sixth milestone from Rome along the Via Laurentina; it is likely this was thought to have marked the boundary between the early Romans and their neighbors in Laurentum. Also, a stone or altar of Terminus was located in the Temple of Jupiter Optimus Maximus on Rome's Capitoline Hill. Because of a belief that this stone had to be exposed to the sky, there was a small hole in the ceiling directly above it. On occasion Terminus's association with Jupiter extended to regarding Terminus as an aspect of that god; Dionysius of Halicarnassus refers to "Jupiter Terminalis", and one inscription names a god "Juppiter Ter."

There is some evidence that Terminus's associations could extend from property boundaries to limits more generally. Under the Republican calendar, when the intercalary month Mercedonius was added to a year, it was placed after February 23 or February 24, and some ancient writers believed that the Terminalia on February 23 had once been the end of the year. Diocletian's decision in 303 AD to initiate his persecution of Christians on February 23 has been seen as an attempt at enlisting Terminus "to put a limit to the progress of Christianity".

== History ==
=== Ancient views ===
Ancient authors agreed that the worship of Terminus was of Sabine origin, ascribing its introduction to Rome either to Titus Tatius, the Sabine colleague of Rome's founding king Romulus (traditional reign 753–717 BC), or to Romulus's successor Numa Pompilius (717–673 BC). Those authors who gave the credit to Numa explained his motivation as the prevention of violent disputes over property. Plutarch further states that, in keeping with Terminus's character as a guarantor of peace, his earliest worship did not involve blood sacrifices.

The stone in the Capitoline Temple was believed to have been among the altars located on the Capitoline Hill before the Temple was built under Tarquinius Priscus (traditional reign 616–579 BC) or Tarquinius Superbus (535–510 BC). When the augurs took the auspices to discover whether the god or goddess of each altar was content for it to be moved, Terminus refused permission, either alone or along with Juventas the goddess of youth. The stone was therefore included within the Capitoline Temple, and its immovability was regarded as a good omen for the permanence of the city's boundaries.

=== Modern views ===
According to the dominant scholarly view during the late 19th and much of the 20th century, Roman religion was originally animistic, directed towards spirits associated with specific objects or activities which were only later perceived as gods with independent personal existence. Terminus, with his lack of mythology and his close association with a physical object, seemed a clear example of a deity who had developed little from such a stage.

This view of Terminus retains some recent adherents, but other scholars have argued from Indo-European parallels that the personalised gods of Roman religion must have preceded the city's foundation. Georges Dumézil regarded Jupiter, Juventas and Terminus as the Roman form of a proto-Indo-European triad, comparing the Roman deities respectively to the Vedic Mitra, Aryaman, and Bhaga. In this view the sovereign god (Jupiter/Mitra) was associated with two minor deities, one concerned with the entry of men into society (Juventas/Aryaman) and the other with the fair division of their goods (Terminus/Bhaga).

== In European art ==
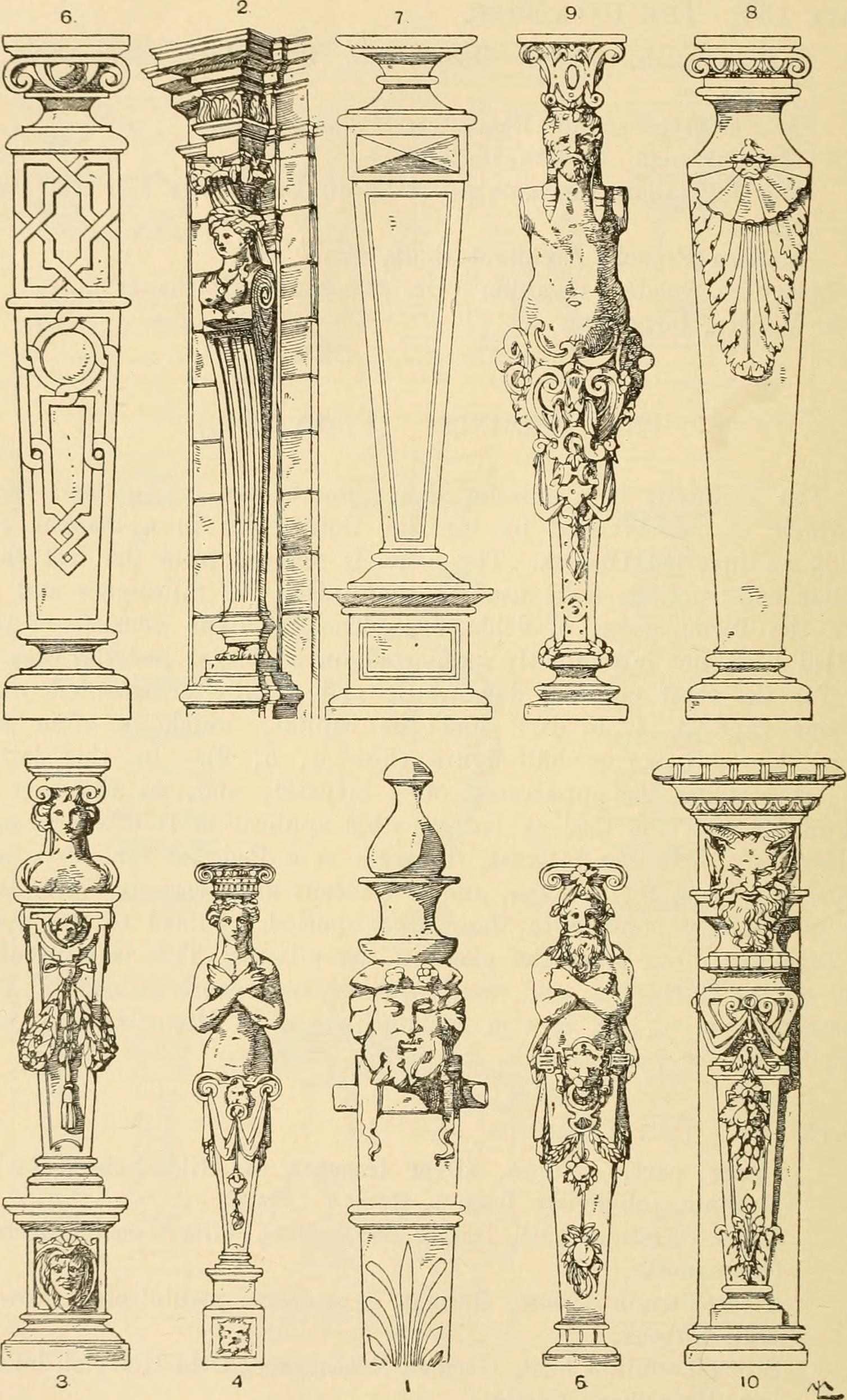
Illustration from F.S. Meyer.

According to F.S. Meyer:

"The Terminus is a pilaster-like support, the fundamental form of which is characterized by tapering downwards in a manner recalling an inverted Obelisk. The name is derived from the fact that similar constructions were used in the Antique as milestones and to mark the Terminations of fields, &c. The Terminus consists of the profiled base, not infrequently supported on a special pedestal (figs. 3 and 7); the shaft tapering downwards and usually ornamented with festoons (figs. 3, 4, 5, 10); and the capital, which., is often replaced by a bust or half-figure (figs. 4, 5, 9). In this latter case, it assumes the appearance of a caryatid; and, as the bust is that of Hermes (the God of letters), this application is often termed a "Hermes". Standing isolated, it serves as a Pedestal for busts and lamps, as a Post for railings, and in gardens and terraces. The last was exceedingly popular in the Rococo period. Joined to the wall, the Terminus often takes the place of the pilaster. This is especially true of the furniture and small architectural constructions of the Renascence period. It is also not uncommon on Utensils, e. g. tripods, handles of pokers, seals, &c".
