= Februarius =

Second month of the revised ancient Roman calendar

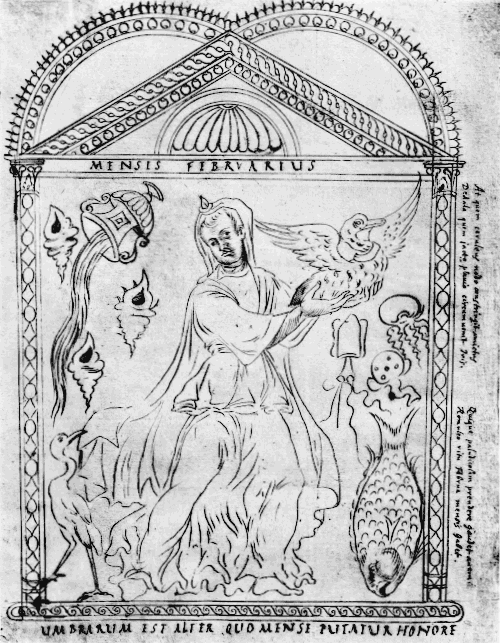
Drawing of the month of February (Mensis Februarius) based on the Calendar of Philocalus (354 AD), with a caption explaining that because the wandering Manes or souls of the dead can permeate the earth in this month, "the shades" (ghosts) are placated by commemorative honors (Note: This image preserves only the hexameter line of the Latin distich, which reads in full: umbrarum est alter, quo mense putatur honore / pervia terra dato manibus esse vagis ("The second month is in honor of ghosts the 'shades'), when the earth is thought to be pervious to the wandering Manes"). A. E. Housman, "Disticha de Mensibus (Anth. Lat. Ries. 665, Poet. Lat. min. Baehr. I ppp. 210f.)," in The Classical Papers of A. E. Housman: 1915–1936, edited by J. Diggle and F. R. D. Goodyear (Cambridge University Press, 1972), vol. 3, p. 1187.)

Februarius, fully Mensis Februarius ("month of Februa"), was the shortest month of the Roman calendar from which the Julian and Gregorian month of February derived. It was eventually placed second in order, preceded by Ianuarius ("month of Janus", January) and followed by Martius ("month of Mars", March). In the oldest Roman calendar, which the Romans believed to have been instituted by their legendary founder Romulus, March was the first month, and the calendar year had only ten months in all. Ianuarius and Februarius were supposed to have been added by Numa Pompilius, the second king of Rome, originally at the end of the year. It is unclear when the Romans reset the course of the year so that January and February came first.

Februarius was the only month in the pre-Julian calendar to have an even number of days, numbering 28. This was mathematically necessary to permit the year itself to have an odd number of days. Ancient sources derived Februarius from februum, a thing used for ritual purification. Most of the observances in this month concerned the dead or closure, reflecting the month's original position at the end of the year. The Parentalia was a nine-day festival honoring the ancestors and propitiating the dead, while the Terminalia was a set of rituals pertaining to boundary stones that was probably also felt to reinforce the boundary of the year.

== In the agricultural year ==
Many Roman festivals and religious observances reflect the Romans' agrarian way of life in their early history. In his treatise on farming, Varro divides the agricultural year into eight phases, with Spring beginning officially on February 7, when Favonius the west wind was thought to start blowing favorably and it was time to ready the fields. The grain fields were to be weeded, vineyards tended, and old reeds burned. Some kinds of trees were pruned, and attention was given to olive and fruit trees.

The agricultural writer Columella says that meadows and grain fields are "purged" (purguntur), probably both in the practical sense of clearing away old debris and by means of ritual. The duties of February thus suggest the close bond between agriculture and religion in Roman culture. According to the farmers' almanacs, the tutelary deity of the month was Neptune.

== Dates ==
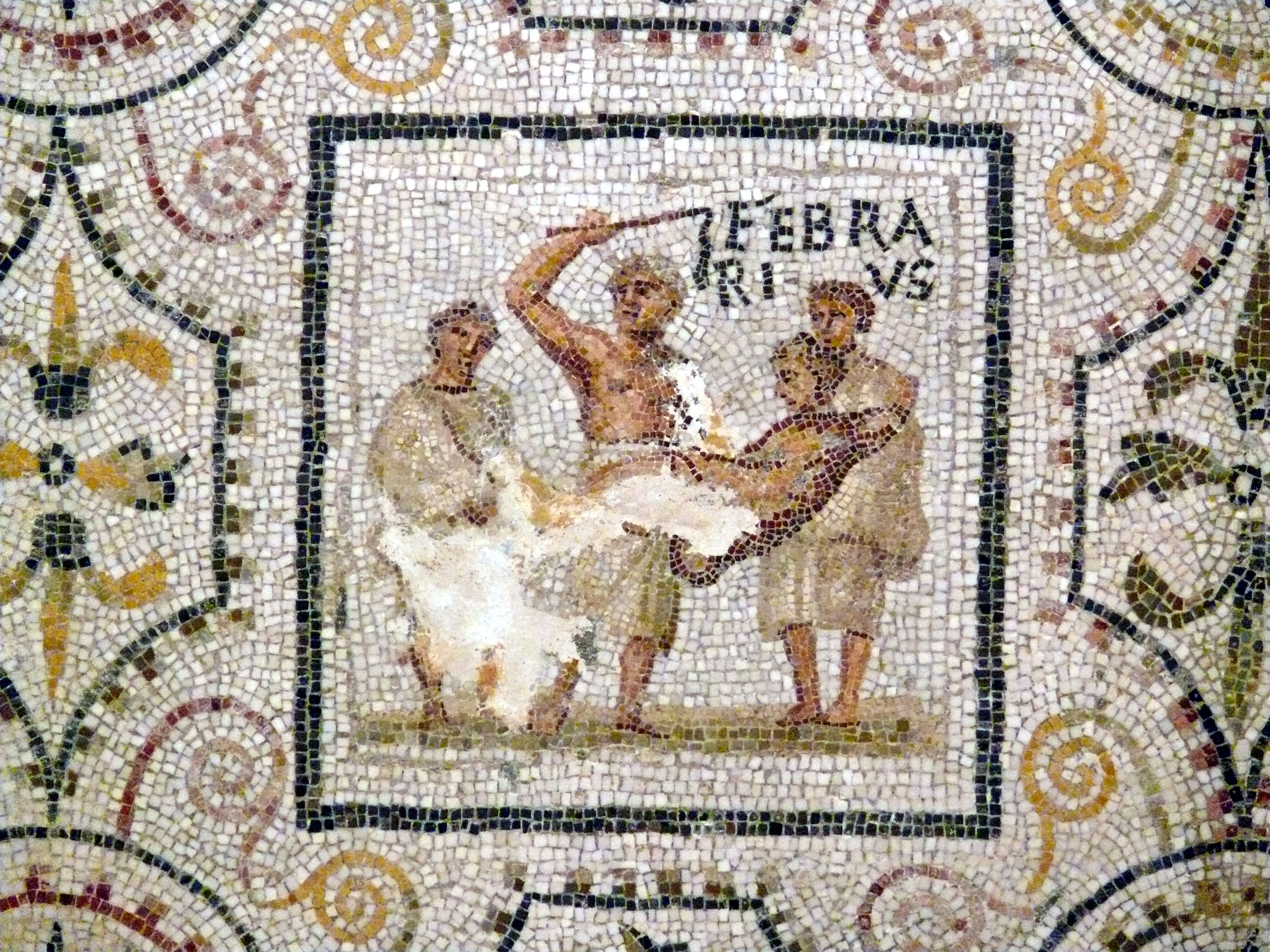
Februarius panel from the 3rd-century mosaic of the months at El Djem, Tunisia (Roman Africa)

The Romans did not number days of a month sequentially from the 1st through the last day. Instead, they counted back from the three fixed points of the month: the Nones (5th or 7th, depending on the length of the month), the Ides (13th or 15th), and the Kalends (1st) of the following month. The Nones of February was the 5th, and the Ides the 13th. The last day of February was the pridie Kalendas Martias, "day before the Kalends of March". Roman counting was inclusive; February 9 was ante diem V Idūs Februarias, "the 5th day before the Ides (13th) of February," usually abbreviated a.d. V Id. Feb. (or with the a.d. omitted altogether); February 23 was VI Kal. Mart., "the 6th day before the Kalends of March."

February had one and possibly two moveable feasts (feriae conceptivae). The Amburbium ("City Circuit") was a purification of the whole city with no fixed date, but seems to have been held in February. The Fornacalia ("Oven Festival") was celebrated by the thirty ancient divisions of the Roman people known as curiae. Each curia celebrated a festival separately under its own leader (curio) on various days following the Nones. These dates were established and publicized by the curio maximus, the chief curio. Anyone who missed the Fornacalia celebrated by his own curia, or who didn't know his curia, could attend a public festival which was always held as the concluding ceremony on February 17. The Fornacalia overlapped with the festival of the ancestral dead that dominated the month, and on its last day coincided with the Quirinalia, a day also known as the Feast of Fools (feriae stultorum). Februarius was thus such a religiously complex month that during the Julian reform of the calendar, when days were added to some months, it was left as it had been, even though it was the shortest month.

Each day was marked with a letter to denote its status under religious law. In the month of February:

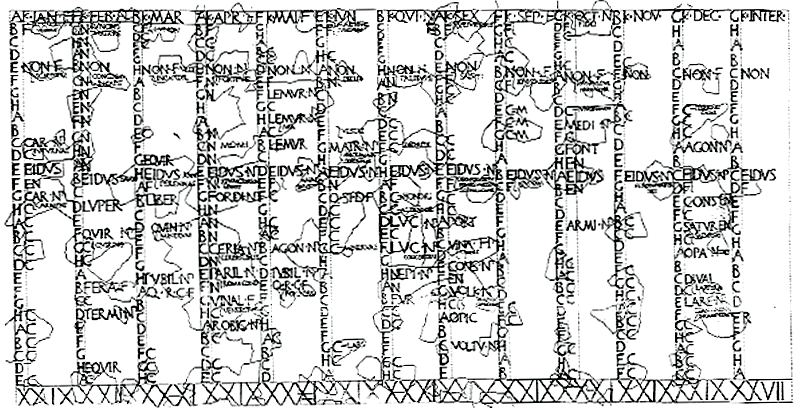
Drawing of the fragmentary Fasti Antiates, a pre-Julian calendar showing Februarius (abbreviated FEB) at the top of the second column

- F for dies fasti, days when it was legal to initiate action in the courts of civil law;
- C for dies comitalis, a day on which the Roman people could hold assemblies (comitia), elections, and certain kinds of judicial proceedings;
- N for dies nefasti, when these political activities and the administration of justice were prohibited;
- NP, the meaning of which remains elusive, but which marked feriae, public holidays;
- EN for endotercissus, an archaic form of intercissus, "cut in half," meaning days that were nefasti in the morning, when sacrifices were being prepared, and in the evening, while sacrifices were being offered, but were fasti in the middle of the day.

By the late 2nd century AD, extant calendars no longer show days marked with these letters, probably in part as a result of calendar reforms undertaken by Marcus Aurelius. Days were also marked with nundinal letters in cycles of A B C D E F G H, to mark the "market week" (these are omitted on the table below).

On a dies religiosus, individuals were not to undertake any new activity, nor do anything other than tend to the most basic necessities. On the calendar under the Republic, a dies natalis was an anniversary such as a temple founding or rededication, sometimes thought of as the "birthday" of a deity. During the Imperial period, some of the traditional festivals localized at Rome became less important, and the birthdays and anniversaries of the emperor and his family gained prominence as Roman holidays. On the calendar of military religious observances known as the Feriale Duranum, sacrifices pertaining to Imperial cult outnumber the older festivals.

Festivals marked in large letters on extant fasti, represented by festival names in all capital letters on the table, are thought to have been the most ancient holidays, becoming part of the calendar before 509 BC. After the mid-1st century AD, a number of dates are added to calendars for spectacles and games (circenses) held in honor of various deities in the venue called a "circus".

Unless otherwise noted, the dating and observances on the following table are from H.H. Scullard, Festivals and Ceremonies of the Roman Republic (Cornell University Press, 1981), pp. 69–84.

Modern date	Roman date	status	Observances
Feb. 1	Kalendae Februariae	N	• dies natalis of the Temple to Juno Sospita • Circenses for Hercules (after the mid-1st century AD)
2	ante diem IV Nonas Februarias	N	
3	a.d. III Nonas Februarias	N	
4	pridie Nonas Februarias	N	
5	Nonae Februariae	N	• dies natalis of the Temple to Concordia on the Capitoline Hill
6	ante diem VIII Idūs Februarias	N	
7	a. d. VII Id. Feb.	N	
8	VI Id. Feb.	N	
9	V Id. Feb.	N	
10	IV Id. Feb.	N	
11	III Id. Feb.	N	Ludi Genialici ("Games for the Genius", perhaps the Genius of the Roman People), after the mid-1st century AD
12	pridie Idūs Februarias	N	Ludi Genialici continue
13	Idūs Februariae	NP dies religiosus	• dies natalis of a Temple to Faunus on the Tiber Island • the nine-day Parentatio or Parentalia begins, with a public rite conducted by the Vestals for the collective di parentes or ancestors of the Roman people
14	ante diem XVI Kalendas Martias	N	• Parentalia continues
15	a.d. XV Kal. Mart.	NP dies religiosus	• FEBRUA (later) LUPERCALIA • Parentalia continues
16	XIV Kal. Mart.	EN	• Parentalia continues
17	XIII Kal. Mart.	NP dies religiosus	• QUIRINALIA • last day of the Fornacalia • Parentalia continues
18	XII Kal. Mart.	C	• Parentalia continues
19	XI Kal. Mart.	C	• Parentalia continues
20	X Kal. Mart.	C	• Parentalia continues
21	IX Kal. Mart.	F dies religiosus	• FERALIA, marking the end of the Parentalia with offerings to the Manes
22	VIII Kal. Mart.	C	• Caristia, family celebration that finished the Parentalia
23	VII Kal. Mart.	NP	• TERMINALIA
24	VI Kal. Mart.	N	• REGIFUGIUM
25	V Kal. Mart.	C	* Lorio, established by Hadrian to commemorate the adoption of Antoninus Pius as Caesar
26	IV Kal. Mart.	EN	
27	III Kal. Mart.	NP	• EQUIRRIA
28	pridie Kalendas Martias	C	

== See also ==
- Month names: Martius, Aprilis, Maius, Junius, Quintilis, Sextilis, September, October, November, December.
- Leap month: Mercedonius or Intercalaris.
