= Fasti Antiates Maiores =

Roman calendar

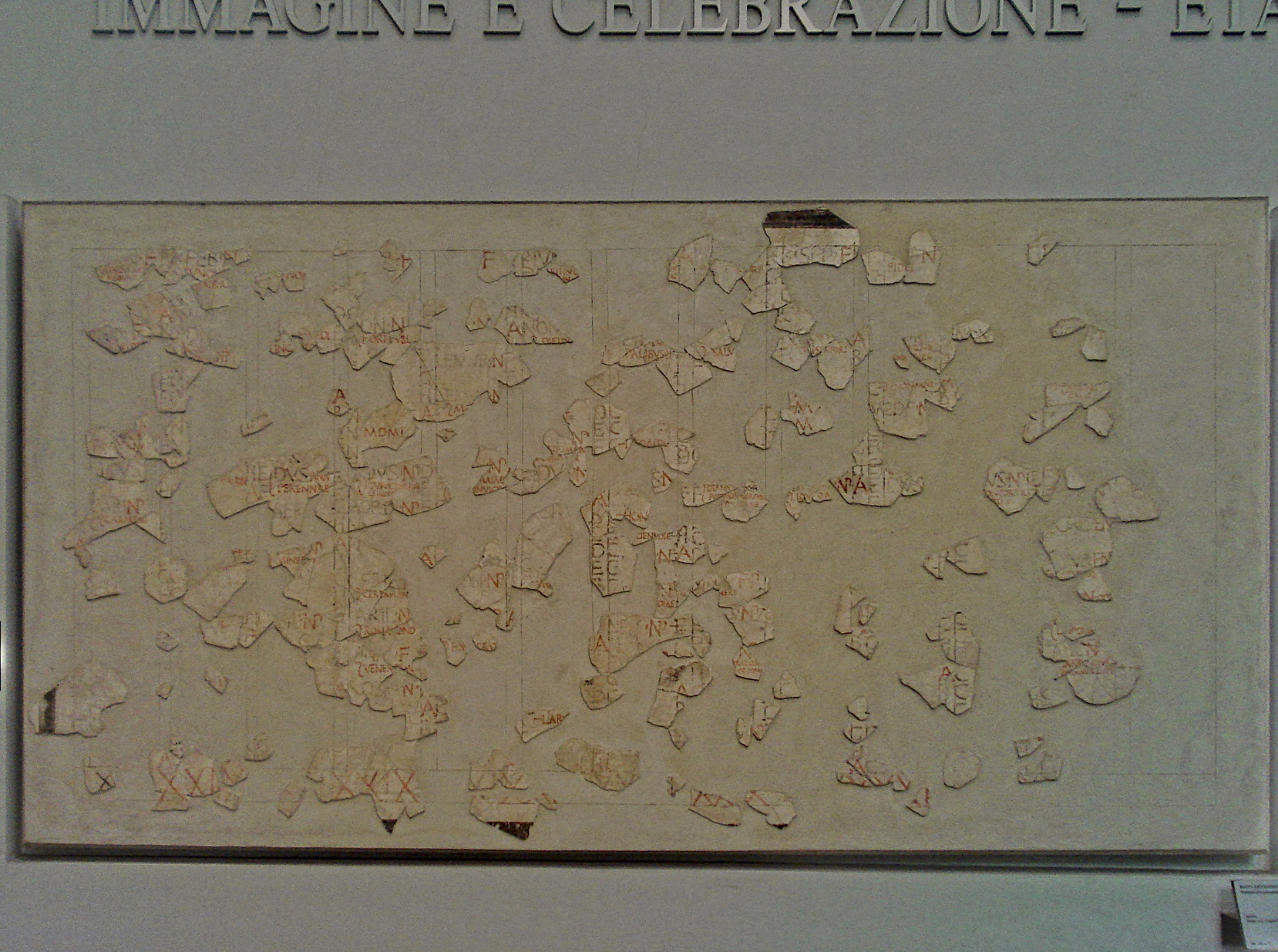
Fasti Antiates Maiores, arranged excavated pieces

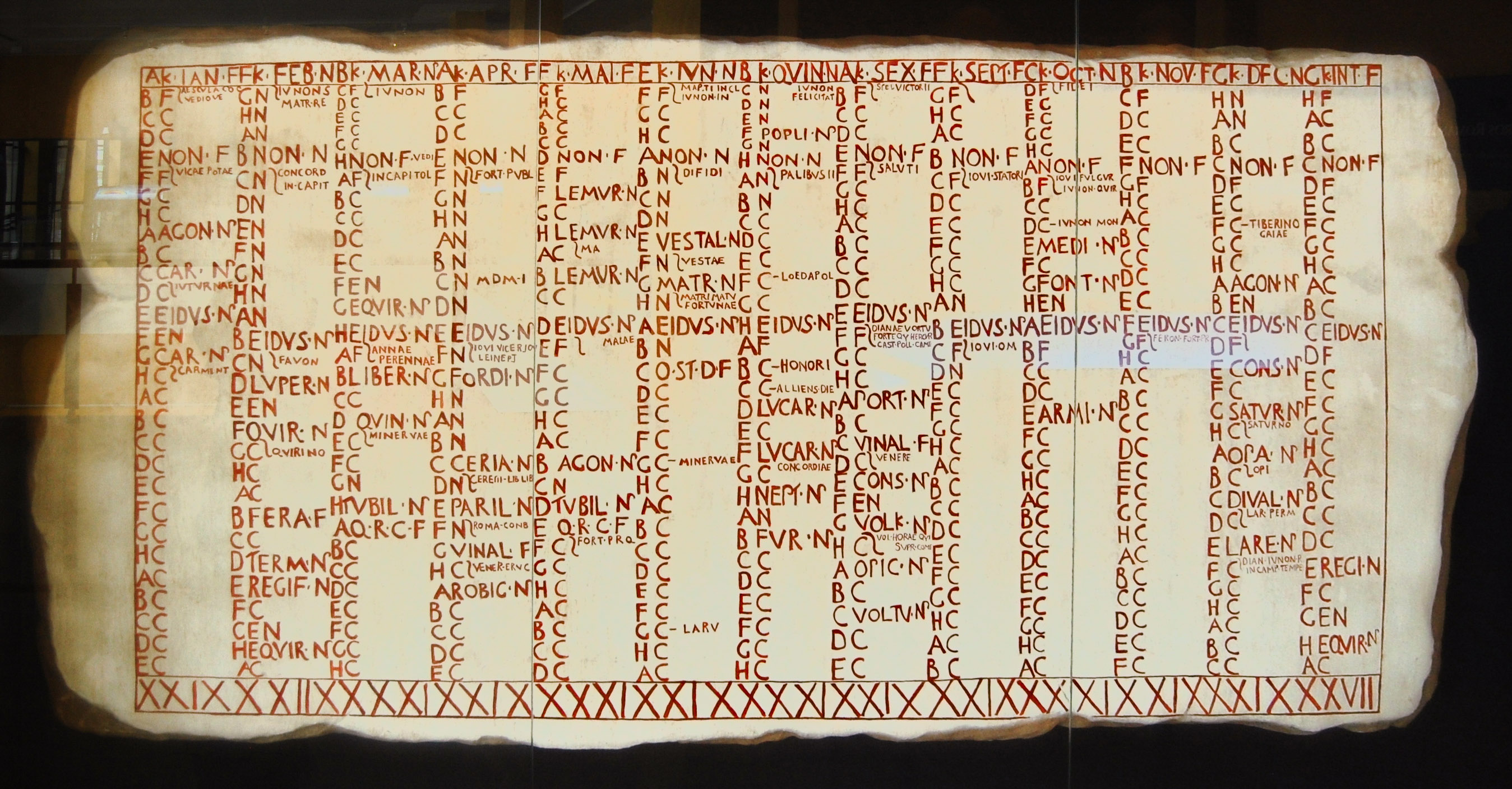
Fasti Antiates Maiores, reconstruction

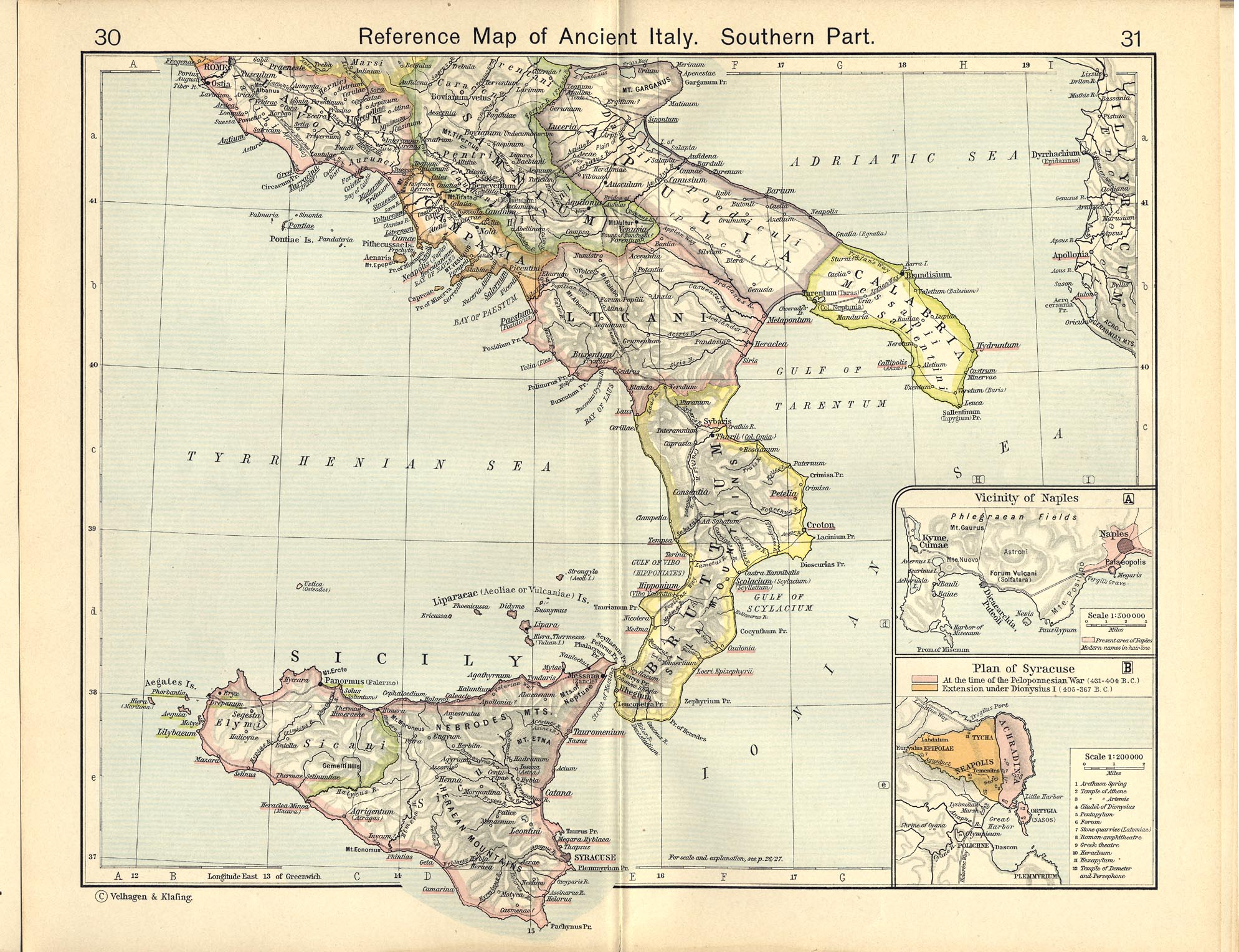
Antium (Anzio) is south of Rome

The Fasti Antiates Maiores is a painted wall-calendar from the late Roman Republic, the oldest archaeologically attested local Roman calendar and the only such calendar known from before the Julian calendar reforms. It was created between 84 and 55 BC and discovered in 1915 at Anzio (ancient Antium) in a crypt next to the coast. It is now located in the Palazzo Massimo alle Terme in Rome, part of the Museo Nazionale Romano.

== Background ==
Anzio lies about 58 km south of Rome in the region of modern Lazio.

In the 6th century BC, at the latest, the Latins inhabited the region of Latium, including Antium, this town until being taken by the Volsci, remaining independent of Rome until 338 BC. The Romans first took control of the region in the Latin War after the Battle of Trifanum and incorporated it into the Roman republic.

== Description ==
The Fasti Antiates maiores consist of two fragments of the thirteen month calendar and the List of Roman consuls. The 1.16 m high and 2.5 m wide calendar contains the leap month Mensis Intercalaris in addition to the twelve months.

The list of consuls was the same height as the calendar, but 1.36 m wide. The names of the consuls span the period from 164 BC to 84 BC. According to the restoration of the lacunae at both ends, the list originally extended from 173 BC to 67 BC.

== Contents ==
The calendar takes the form of a table with thirteen columns, each of which is a month labelled with an abbreviation of its name. Still legible are the following: IAN for Ianuarius (January), FEB for Februarius (February), APR for Aprilis (April), IVN for Iunius (June), and SEP for September.

Each column consists of several rows containing the days as well as a supplementary row indicating the total number of days in the month. Still visible are XXIIX (28) for February, XXIX (29) for April, June and partly for August, XXXI (31) (partial) for May and October.

Each day is marked with a letter from A to H, indicating the position of the day in the Roman nundinal cycle, with occasional further letters appended to note the ceremonial category of the day:

The first day of each month is marked by the letter K, short for Kalendae. The fifth day of January, February, April, June, August, September, November, and December is marked with the letters NON, short for Nonae, whereas NON is placed in the seventh day for the months of March, May, July, and October. The eighth day after the Nones of each month is labelled EIDVS (Ides).

Some days are marked with the letters F, N or C. F is short for fastus dies ("allowed days", when it was legal to initiate action in the courts of civil law), N for nefastus dies (banned days, when it was not), and C for comitialis dies (assembly days, when political assemblies were permitted).

The calendar also lists the foundation dates (dies natales) of the temples in the city of Rome. The fact that the foundation of the Temple of Venus connected to the Theatre of Pompey is missing indicates that the calendar was created before 55 BCE. The calendar also includes important events, like the Ludi Megalenses, one of the festivals of the cult of Magna Mater. The inauguration of her temple on the Palatine occurred on 11 April 191 BCE. The relevant festival took place from 4–11 April. A confirmation of the date of the Ludi Megalenses is found in the Fasti Quirinales, which additionally classify 11 April as Endoitio Exitio Nefas. Later Fasti contain a transmission error, which is why they provide the incorrect dates of 4–10 April.

== Bibliography ==
- Jörg Rüpke. Kalender und Öffentlichkeit: Die Geschichte der Repräsentation und religiösen Qualifikation von Zeit in Rom. de Gruyter, Berlin 1995, ISBN 3-11-014514-6
- Attilio Degrassi. Inscriptiones Italiae, Vol. 13: Fasti et Elogia, Fasc. 2: Fasti anni Numani et Iuliani, 1963. Original publication, including large color images, with reconstruction.
