= Amburbium =

Ancient Roman festival

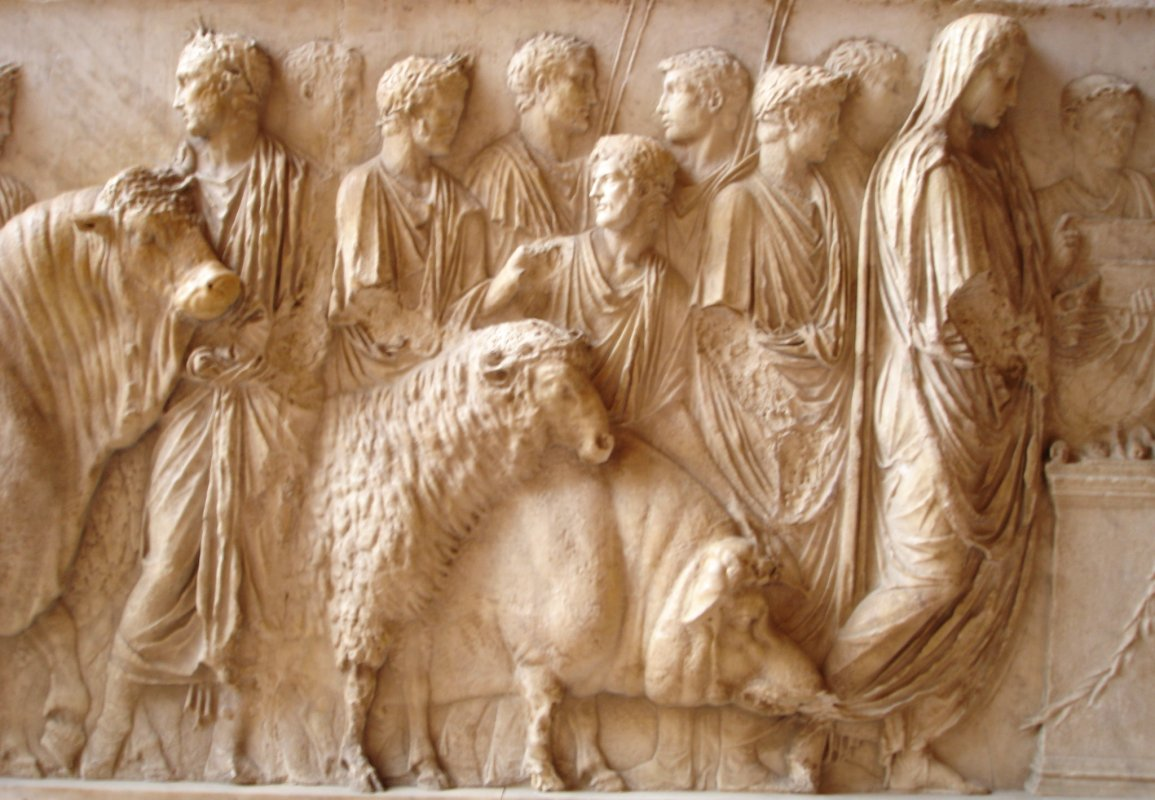
- Procession of the suovetaurilia, led by the priest with his head ritually covered
- Observed by: Roman Republic, Roman Empire
- Type: Classical Roman religion
- Celebrations: Singing of hymns (carmina)
- Observances: Procession around the city; sacrifice of a pig, sheep, and bull
- Date: February (?)
- Frequency: annual
- Related to: Ambarvalia and lustration

The Amburbium ("City Circuit", from ambire, "to go around" + urb-, "city"; plural amburbia) was an ancient Roman festival for purifying the city; that is, a lustration (lustratio urbis). It took the form of a procession, perhaps along the old Servian Wall, though the length of 10 kilometers would seem impractical to circumambulate. If it was a distinct festival held annually, the most likely month is February, but no date is recorded and the ritual may have been performed as a "crisis rite" when needed.

The Amburbium can be hard to distinguish from the Ambarvalia in ancient sources, either because it was a similar set of ritual procedures performed on behalf of the city instead of the fields or rural areas (arva), or because both originated with the priesthood of the Arvales, "Brothers of the Fields". Vopiscus sees the two as closely related: "the city is purified, the hymns are chanted, the Amburbium is celebrated, the Ambarvalia is carried out." Both festivals seem to have involved the sacrifice of a pig, a sheep, and a bull (suovetaurilia). The Amburbium's sacrificial victims (hostiae) were amburbiales. According to Servius, for the Ambarvalia a hostia with the capacity to produce felicitas ("fecundity, blessedness") is led around in a ritual circuit three times; the ceremony, he says, is called an amburbium when it is the city that is circumambulated. The encircling (circuire) is identical with the purification (lustrare).

Amburbium does not appear on any of the ancient calendars, and is thus assumed if annual to be one of the feriae conceptivae, a moveable feast. Macrobius, an antiquarian writer of late antiquity, says that the semi-legendary second king of Rome Numa added Ianuarius and Februarius to the end of the ten-month calendar of Romulus, and instituted a lustration of the city in February, with the sacrifices to be offered to the Di Manes. The Amburbium is not named as such in the passage, but H.H. Scullard thought it might be meant. Most festival activity in February pertained to the care and propitiation of the dead. The scarcity of evidence may indicate that in the Imperial period the Amburbium was celebrated irregularly as needed, but it was performed as late as 271 AD. According to the Historia Augusta, on January 11 of that year the emperor Aurelian ordered a consultation of the Sibylline books, a collection of prophetic utterances from the gods (fata deorum), resulting in a lustration of the city by means of the Amburbium and Ambarvalia.

The ritual has been compared to the lustral sacrifices described in the Iguvine Tablets, which were conducted by the Fratres Atiedii, a "brotherhood" of priests at Iguvium (present-day Gubbio). It is one of several ceremonies of ancient Roman religion in which a sacred topography is marked out through a procession.

== Description by Lucan ==
The Neronian poet Lucan describes a ritual circumambulation of the city that may be the Amburbium, though the account could also be a fictional composite. In his epic poem about Caesar's civil war, Lucan says that when Julius Caesar returned from Gaul and marched his troops toward the city, a panic broke out and a number of omens (prodigia) were reported. Religious specialists were called in, among them an Etruscan prophet (vates) named Arruns who orders up a sequence of ritual procedures, beginning with the destruction of all "freaks of nature" (monstra). The "unspeakable fetuses of a sterile womb" (sterilique nefandos / ex utero fetus) are to be burnt using the wood of "unlucky" trees (religiously infelix). Arruns then sets in motion an amburbium, described in densely religious terms:

He bids the city to be circumambulated (urbem ambiri) by the fearful citizens, and the pontiffs to encircle the length of the sacred boundary (pomerium) along the outer perimeter (fines) while purifying the city walls by means of festal lustration (festo … lustro). A throng of lesser rank follow, wearing the Gabinian cincture. The female priest in fillets leads the Vestal chorus; for her alone is it right to look upon the Minerva brought from Troy. Then came those who conserve the gods' utterances (fata deorum, that is, the priestly college of the quindecimviri) and the arcane chants (carmina) and who call back Cybele after she has been bathed in the little Almo; and the learned augur who observes birds in flight on the left; and the septemvir who presents festal banquets, and the sodality of the Titii, and the Salian priest bearing the sacred shield gladly on his shoulder, and the flamen towering in his conical hat with the well-born point.

Lucan follows the procession with the sacrifice of a bull, whose entrails reveal dire omens, and a prophetic speech by Nigidius Figulus based on his astronomical observations. It is unclear whether this Amburbium was a crisis rite actually held in 49 BC, or "a figment of his poetic imagination".

== See also ==
- Terminalia
- Supplicatio
- Argei
