= Pales =

Ancient Roman pastoral deity

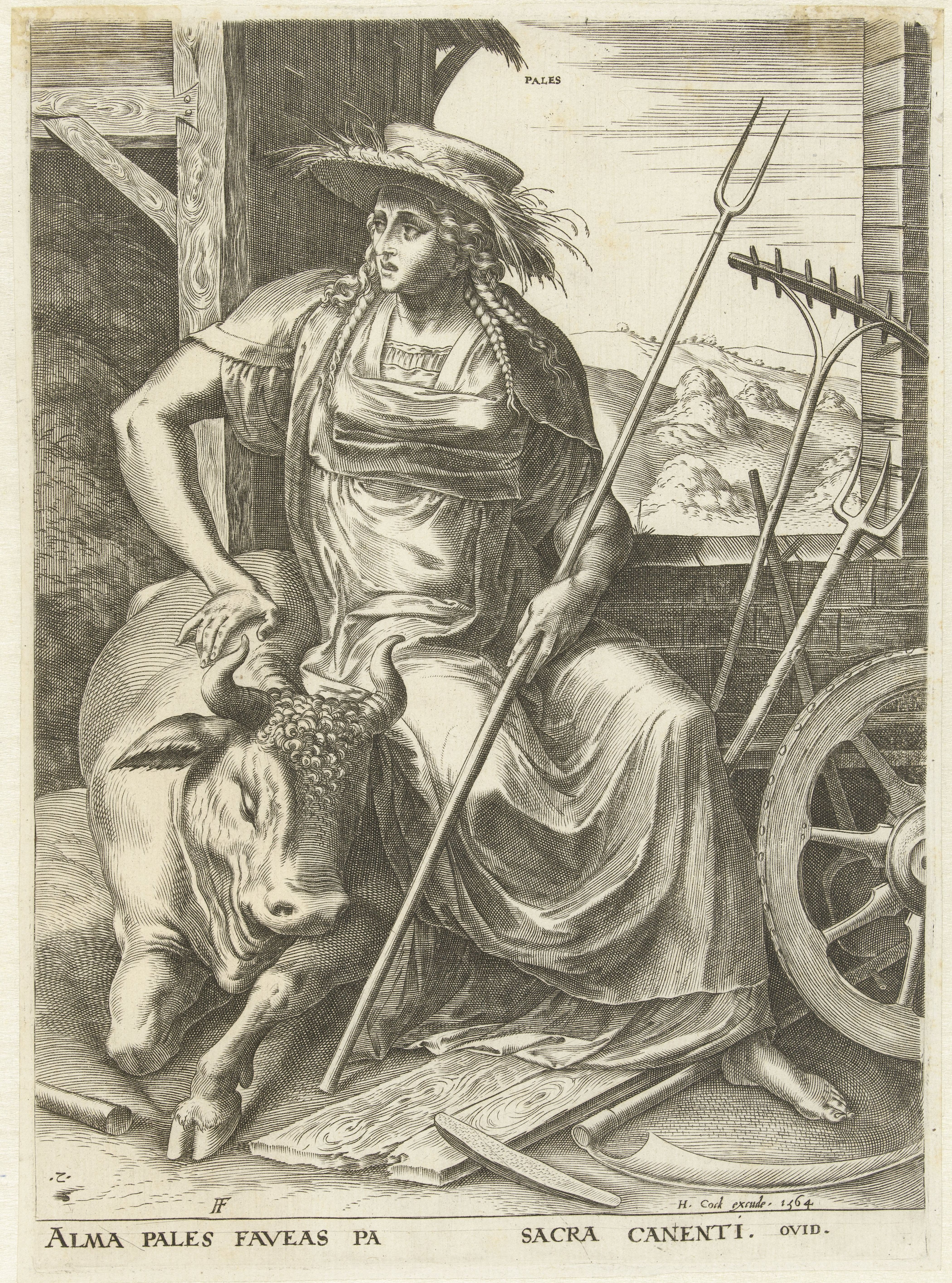
16th-century engraving of Pales, by Cornelis Cort

In ancient Roman religion, Pales was a deity of shepherds, flocks and livestock. Regarded as male by some sources and female by others, Pales can be either singular or plural in Latin, and refers at least once to a pair of deities. Pales may have been a loose Roman equivalent of the Greek god Pan, also a deity of shepherds and flocks.

Pales's festival, called the Parilia, was celebrated on April 21. This coincided with the traditional "birthday" of the city of Rome itself. The festival was linked with a ritual purification for shepherds and their flocks. Sheep pens were cleaned and decorated with plants; bonfires were lit using sulphur with the smoke purifying the livestock; and offerings of cake and milk were given in honor of Pales. Shepherds could also wash themselves, drink milk, and jump through the bonfire smoke themselves. For observation in urban areas such as Rome which lacked shepherds, leftover ashes from calf fetuses burned at Fordicidia (the Ides of March, April 15) may have been sprinkled into sulphur bonfires.

Marcus Atilius Regulus built a temple to Pales in Rome following his victory over the Salentini in 267 BC. It is generally thought to have been located on the Palatine Hill, but, being a victory monument, it may have been located on the route of the triumphal procession, either on the Campus Martius or the Aventine Hill. According to the Fasti Antiates Maiores, there was a festival for "the two Pales" (Palibus duobus) on July 7, probably to mark the dedication of this temple.

The gender of Pales is contradictory. Marcus Terentius Varro writes Pales as male, Virgil and Ovid write Pales as female, and others write that there were two deities named Pales. Krzysztof Tomasz Witczak has suggested the Pales deities, or at least their name, are related to similarly named mythemes of divine twins elsewhere in Proto-Indo-European mythology. He cites the Sicilian pair of gods Palici and the Celtic/Germanic Alci as being potentially related.

Pales appears in pastoral plays of the 16th and 17th centuries, commonly depicted as an assistant to Pan.

== Sources ==
- Richardson, L. (1992). A New Topographical Dictionary of Ancient Rome. Baltimore and London: The Johns Hopkins University Press. (p. 282)
- Scullard, H.H. (1981). Festivals and Ceremonies of the Roman Republic. London: Thames and Hudson. (p. 104–105)
