= Terminalia =

Terminalia may refer to:

- Terminalia (festival), a Roman festival to the god of boundaries Terminus
- Terminalia (plant), a tree genus
- Terminalia (insect anatomy), the terminal region of the abdomen in insects
