= Roman calendar =

Calendar used in Ancient Rome

Today (at UTC+00)
- Wednesday, 18 November 2026
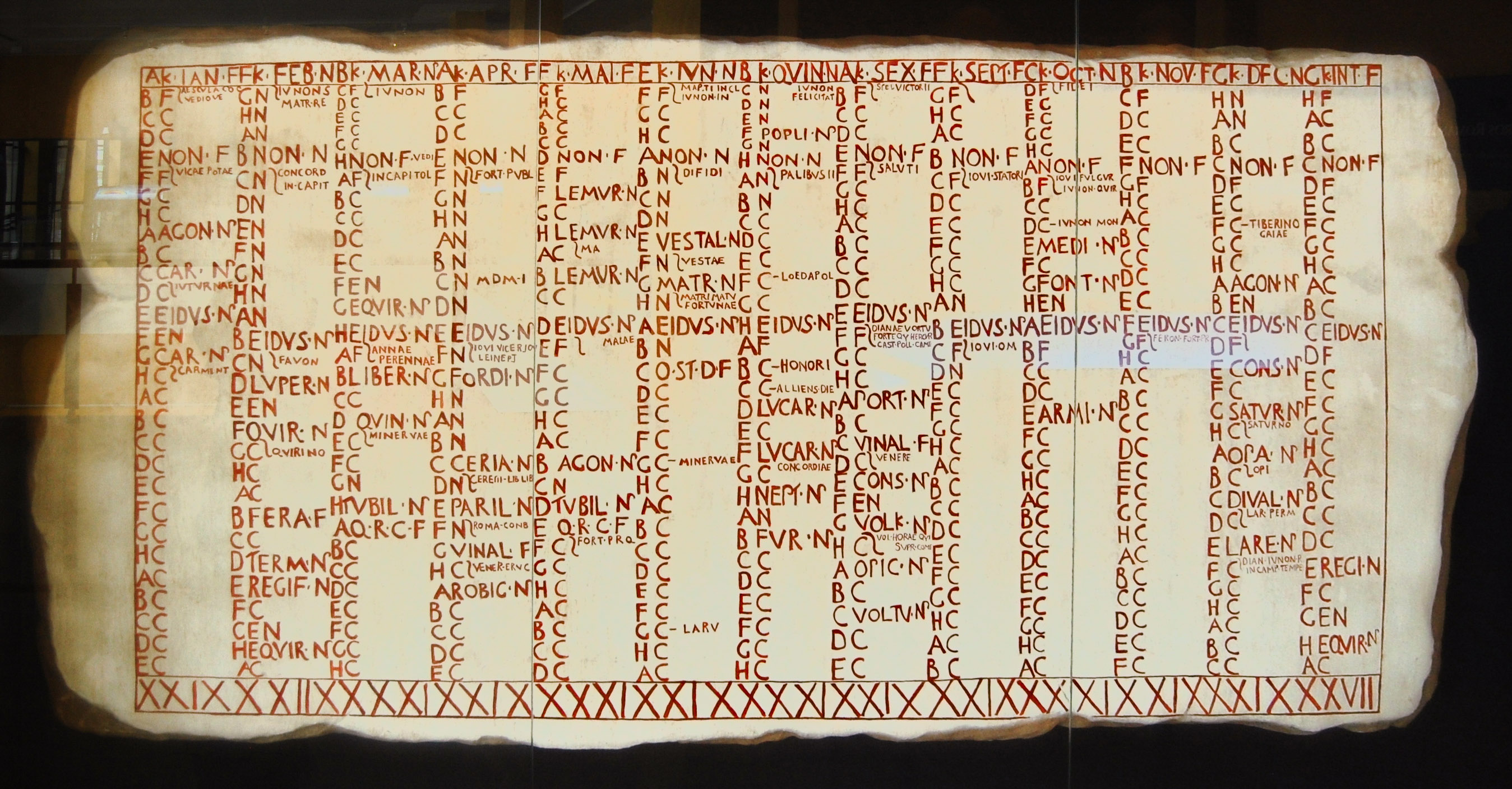
- A reproduction of the Fasti Antiates Maiores, a painted wall-calendar from the late Roman Republic
- Roman: Nonis Novembribus, MMDCCLXXIX AUC
- Julian: 5 November, AD 2026 (AM 7535)
Other calendars
Akan	Monowukuo
Armenian	1 Kʿaloch 1476
Aztec	Tlacaxipehualiztli 7, 1 Xōchitl
Babylonian	7 Arakhsamna, 2337 SE
Balinese pawukon	Luang, Pepet, Kajeng, Laba, Wage, Maulu, Buda of Ukir, Indra, Erangan, Pati
Bengali	3 Ogrohayon, BS 1433
Chinese	Yang Fire Monkey・Winnowing Basket Mansion; Fire Horse Year, Month 10, Day 10 (Lidong, 4 days until Xiaoxue)
Common Era	18 November 2026 CE
Coptic	9 Hathor, AM 1743
Egyptian	6 Pharmuthi, 2775 NE
Ethiopian	9 H̱edār, 2019 Amätä Məhrät
French Republican	Décade III, Septidi de Brumaire de l'Année 235 de la République
Gregorian	18 November, AD 2026
Hebrew	8 Kislev, AM 5787
Hindu	Śatabhiṣaj・Dhruva; Solar: 2 Mārgaśīrṣa, 1948 SE; Lunisolar: Navamī, Śukla pakṣa of Kārtika, 2083 VE; Rāudra・5127 KY・1,872,897
Icelandic	Miðvikudagur, 26 Gormánuður 2026
Islamic	7 Jumada al-thani, AH 1448 (using tabular method)
ISO week date	2026-W47-3
Japanese	10 Kannazuki, Reiwa 8 (Rittō, 4 days until Shōsetsu)
Julian day	2461363
Korean	10 Dwaejidal, 4359 DE
Maya	13.0.14.2.0; 13 Ceh, 1 Ahau
Solar Hijri	27 Aban, SH 1405
Tibetan	9 smin drug, me pho rta 2153 or 1772 or 1000

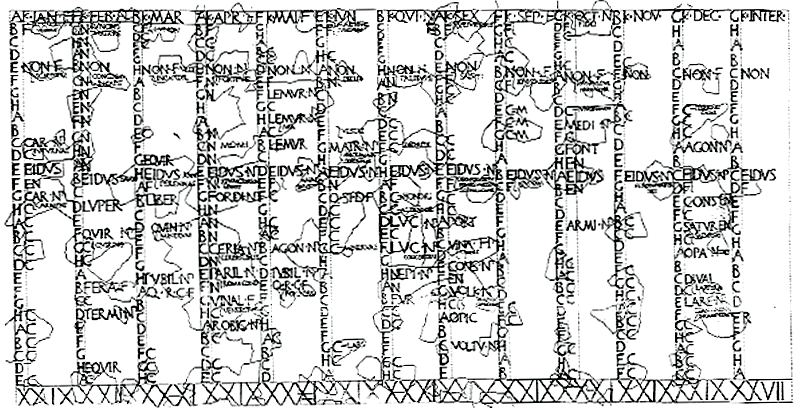
Another reproduction of the fragmentary Fasti Antiates Maiores (c. 60 BC), with the seventh and eighth months still named Quintilis ("QVI") and Sextilis ("SEX") and an intercalary month ("INTER") in the far right-hand column

The Roman calendar was used by the Roman Kingdom and Roman Republic. Although the term is primarily used for Rome's pre-Julian calendars, it is often used inclusively of the Julian calendar established by Julius Caesar in 46 BC. (Note: The term does not include the Alexandrian calendar of Roman Egypt, which continued the unique months of that land's former calendar; the Byzantine calendar of the later Roman Empire, which usually dated the Roman months in the simple count of the ancient Greek calendars; and the Gregorian calendar, which refined the Julian system to bring it into still closer alignment with the tropical year.)

According to most Roman accounts, their original calendar was established by their legendary first king Romulus. It consisted of ten months, beginning in spring with March and leaving winter as an unassigned span of days before the next year. These months each had 30 or 31 days and ran for 38 nundinal cycles, each forming a kind of eight-day week—nine days counted inclusively in the Roman manner—and ending with religious rituals and a public market. This fixed calendar bore traces of its origin as an observational lunar one. In particular, the most important days of each month—its kalends, nones, and ides—seem to have derived from the new moon, the first-quarter moon, and the full moon respectively. To a late date, the College of Pontiffs formally proclaimed each of these days on the Capitoline Hill and Roman dating counted down inclusively towards the next such day in any month. (For example, the year-end festival of Terminalia on 23 February was called VII. Kal. Mart., the 6th day before the March kalends.)

Romulus's successor Numa Pompilius is usually credited with a revised calendar that divided winter between the two months of January and February, shortened most other months, and established rough alignment with the solar year by some system of intercalation. This is a typical feature of lunisolar calendars and was necessary to keep the Roman religious festivals and other activities within their proper seasons.

Modern historians dispute various points of this account. It is possible the original calendar was agriculturally based, observational of the seasons and stars rather than of the moon, with ten months of varying length filling the entire year. If this ever existed, it would have changed to the lunisolar system later credited to Numa during the kingdom or early Republic under the influence of the Etruscans and of Pythagorean Southern Italian Greeks. After the establishment of the Republic, years began to be dated by consulships but the calendar and its rituals were otherwise very conservatively maintained until the Late Republic. Even when the nundinal cycles had completely departed from correlation with the moon's phases, a pontiff was obliged to meet the sacred king, to claim that he had observed the new moon, and to offer a sacrifice to Juno to solemnize each kalends.

It is clear that, for a variety of reasons, the intercalation necessary for the system's accuracy was not always observed. Astronomical events recorded in Livy show the civil calendar had varied from the solar year by an entire season in 190 BC and was still two months off in 168 BC. By the 191 BC Lex Acilia or before, control of intercalation was given to the pontifex maximus but—as these were often active political leaders like Caesar—political considerations continued to interfere with its regular application.

Victorious in his civil war, Caesar reformed the calendar in 46 BC, making the year of his third consulship last for 446 days. This new Julian calendar was an entirely solar one, influenced by the Egyptian calendar. In order to avoid interfering with Rome's religious ceremonies, the reform distributed the unassigned days among the months (towards their ends) and did not adjust any nones or ides, even in months which came to have 31 days. The Julian calendar was designed to have a single leap day every fourth year by repeating February 24 (Note: Two days in a row were given the same date. This practice continued well into the sixteenth century.) (a doubled VI. Kal. Mart. or ante diem bis sextum Kalendas Martias) but, following Caesar's assassination, the priests mistakenly added the bissextile (bis sextum) leap day every three years due to their inclusive counting. In order to bring the calendar back to its proper place, Augustus was obliged to suspend intercalation for one or two decades.

At 365.25 days, the Julian calendar remained slightly longer than the solar year (365.24 days). By the 16th century, the date of Easter had shifted so far away from the vernal equinox that Pope Gregory XIII ordered a further correction to the calendar method, resulting in the establishment of the modern Gregorian calendar.

== History ==
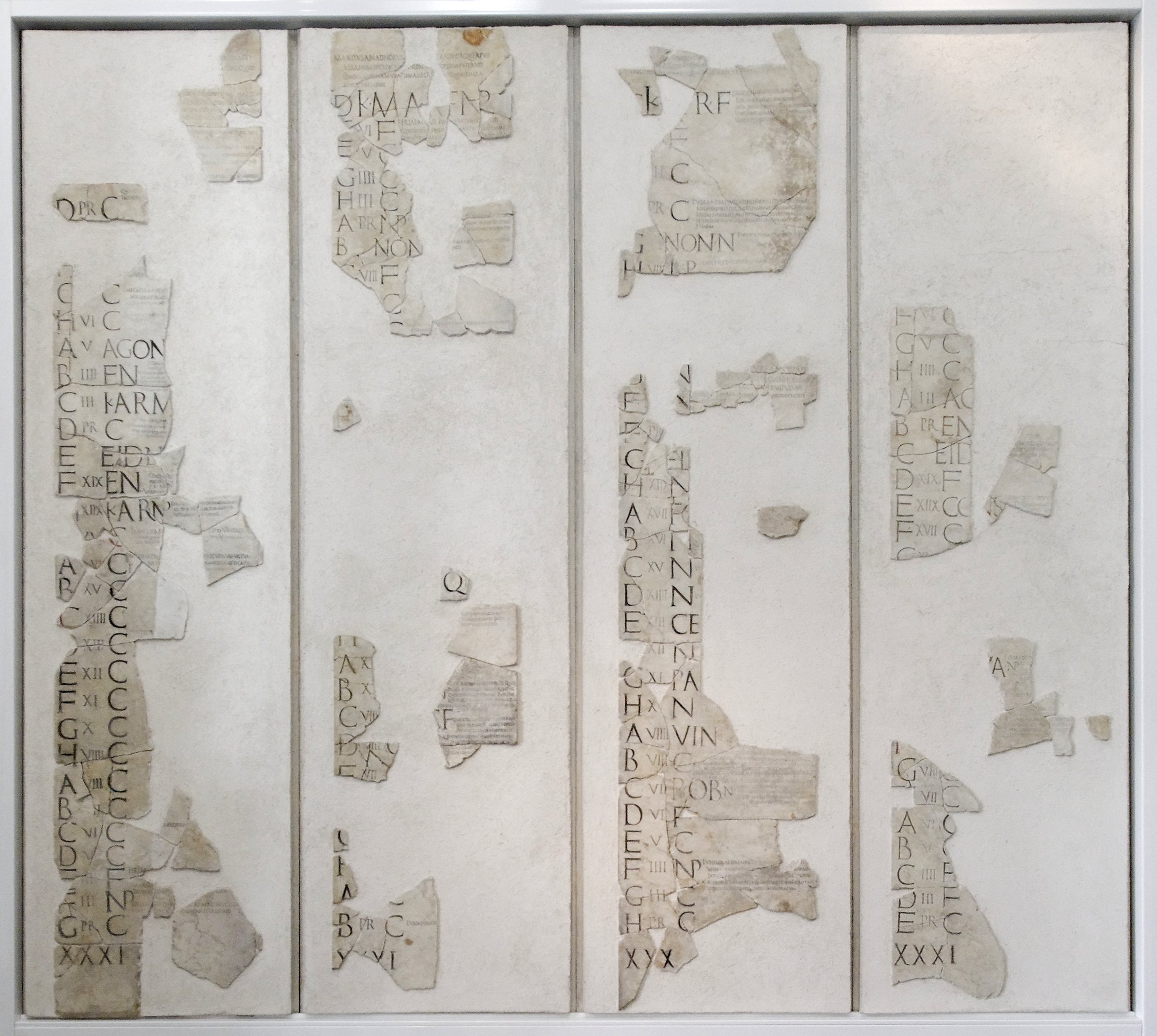
The remains of the Fasti Praenestini, containing the months of January, March, April, and December and a portion of February.

=== Prehistoric calendar ===
The original Roman calendar is usually believed to have been an observational lunar calendar whose months ended and began from the new moon. Because a lunar cycle is about 29.5 days long, such months would have varied between 29 and 30 days. Twelve such months would have fallen 10 or 11 days short of the solar year and, without adjustment, such a year would have quickly rotated out of alignment with the seasons in the manner of the Islamic calendar. Given the seasonal aspects of the calendar and its associated religious festivals, this was presumably avoided through some form of arbitrary curtailment or intercalation or through the suspension of the calendar during winter. Against this, Michels has argued that the early calendars used by Rome and its neighbors were more probably observational of seasonal markers in nature (the leafing of trees), animal behavior (the migration of birds), and the agricultural cycle (the ripening of grain) combined with observation of stars in the night sky. She considers that this more sensibly accounts for later legends of Romulus's decimal year and the great irregularity in Italian month lengths recorded in Censorinus. Roman works on agriculture including those of Cato, Varro, Vergil, Columella, and Pliny invariably date their practices based on suitable conditions or upon the rising of stars, with only occasional supplementary mention of the civil calendar of their times until the 4th or 5th century author Palladius. Augury, formal Roman ornithomancy, continued to be the focus of a prestigious dedicated priesthood until at least the end of the 4th century. Although most Roman festivals in the historical record were closely tied to the nundinal cycle of the later calendar, there remained several moveable feasts (feriae conceptivae, "proclaimed festivals") like the Sementivae that were dependent on local conditions. Michels suggests this was the original state of all ancient festivals, marking divisions between the seasons and occasions within them.

=== Legendary 10-month calendar ===
The Romans themselves usually described their first organized year as one with ten fixed months, a decimal division fitting general Roman practice. There were four months of "31" days—March, May, Quintilis, and October—called "full months" (pleni menses) and six months of "30" days—April, June, Sextilis, September, November, and December—called "hollow months" (cavi menses). These "304" days made up exactly 38 nundinal cycles. The months were kept in alignment with the moon, however, by counting the new moon as the last day of the first month and simultaneously the first day of the next month. The system is usually said to have left the remaining two to three months of the year as an unorganized "winter", since they were irrelevant to the farming cycle. Macrobius claims the 10-month calendar was fixed and allowed to shift until the summer months were completely misplaced, at which time additional days belonging to no month were simply inserted into the calendar until it seemed things were restored to their proper place. Licinius Macer's lost history apparently similarly stated that even the earliest Roman calendar employed intercalation.

Later Roman writers usually credited this calendar to Romulus, their legendary first king and culture hero, although this was common with other practices and traditions whose origin had been lost to them. Censorinus considered him to have borrowed the system from Alba Longa, his supposed birthplace. Some scholars doubt the existence of this calendar at all, as it is only attested in late Republican and Imperial sources and supported only by the misplaced names of the months from September to December. Rüpke also finds the coincidence of the length of the supposed "Romulan" year with the length of the first ten months of the Julian calendar to indicate that it is an a priori interpretation by late Republican writers.

Calendar of Romulus
English	Latin	Meaning	Length in days
March	Mensis Martius	Month of Mars	31
April	Mensis Aprilis		30
May	Mensis Maius	Month of Maia	31
June	Mensis Iunius	Month of Juno	30
July	Mensis Quintilis; Mensis Quinctilis	Fifth Month	31
August	Mensis Sextilis	Sixth Month	30
September	Mensis September	Seventh Month	30
October	Mensis October	Eighth Month	31
November	Mensis November	Ninth Month	30
December	Mensis December	Tenth Month	30
Length of the year:			304

Other traditions existed alongside this one, however. Plutarch's Parallel Lives recounts that Romulus's calendar had been solar but adhered to the general principle that the year should last for 360 days. Months were employed secondarily and haphazardly, with some counted as 20 days and others as 35 or more. Plutarch records that while one tradition is that Numa added two new months to a ten-month calendar, another version is that January and February were originally the last two months of the year and Numa just moved them to the start of the year, so that January (named after a peaceful ruler called Janus) would come before March (which was named for Mars, the god of war).

Rome's 8-day week, the nundinal cycle, was shared with the Etruscans, who used it as the schedule of royal audiences. It was presumably a part of the early calendar and was credited in Roman legend variously to Romulus and Servius Tullius.

=== Republican calendar ===
The attested calendar of the Roman Republic was quite different. It had twelve months, already including January and February during the winter.

According to Livy, it was Numa Pompilius, the second king of Rome (715–673 BC), who divided the year into twelve lunar months (History of Rome, I.19). Fifty days, says Censorinus, were added to the calendar and a day taken from each month of thirty days to provide for the two winter months: Januarius (January) and Februarius (February), both of which had 28 days (The Natal Day, XX). This was a lunar year of 354 days but, because of the Roman superstition about even numbers, an additional day was added to January to make the calendar 355 days long. Auspiciously, each month now had an odd number of days: Martius (March), Maius (May), Quinctilis (July), and October continued to have 31; the other months, 29, except for February, which had 28 days. Considered unlucky, it was devoted to rites of purification (februa) and expiation appropriate to the last month of the year. (Although these legendary beginnings attest to the venerability of the lunar calendar of the Roman Republic, its historical origin probably was the publication of a revised calendar by the Decemviri in 450 BC as part of the Twelve Tables, Rome's first code of law.)

The inequality between the lunar year of 355 days and the tropical year of 365.25 days led to a shortfall over four years of (10.25 × 4) = 41 days. Theoretically, 22 days were interpolated into the calendar in the second year of the four-year cycle and 23 days in the fourth. This produced an excess of four days over the four years in line with the normal one day excess over one year. The method of correction was to truncate February by five days and follow it with the intercalary month which thus commenced (normally) on the day after February 23 and had either 27 or 28 days. February 23 was the Terminalia and in a normal year it was a.d. VII Kal. Mart. Thus the dates of the festivals of the last five days of February were preserved on account of them being actually named and counted inclusively in days before the kalends of March; they were traditionally part of the celebration for the new year. There was occasionally a delay of one day (a dies intercalaris being inserted between February 23 and the start of the mensis intercalaris) for the purpose of avoiding a clash between a particular festival and a particular day of the week (see Hebrew calendar § Rosh Hashanah postponement rules for another example). The Roman superstitions concerning the numbering and order of the months seem to have arisen from Pythagorean superstitions concerning the luckiness of odd numbers.

These Pythagorean-based changes to the Roman calendar were generally credited by the Romans to Numa Pompilius, Romulus's successor and the second of Rome's seven kings, as were the two new months of the calendar. (Note: Plutarch reports this tradition while claiming that the months had more probably predated or originated with Romulus.) Most sources thought he had established intercalation with the rest of his calendar. Although Livy's Numa instituted a lunar calendar, the author claimed the king had instituted a 19-year system of intercalation equivalent to the Metonic cycle centuries before its development by Babylonian and Greek astronomers. (Note: This equivalence was first described by Stanyan in his history of ancient Greece.) Plutarch's account claims he ended the former chaos of the calendar by employing 12 months totalling 354 days—the length of the lunar and Greek years—and a biennial intercalary month of 22 days called Mercedonius.

According to Livy's Periochae, the beginning of the consular year changed from March to 1 January in 153 BC to respond to a rebellion in Hispania. Plutarch believed Numa was responsible for placing January and February first in the calendar; Ovid states January began as the first month and February the last, with its present order owing to the Decemvirs. W. Warde Fowler believed the Roman priests continued to treat January and February as the last months of the calendar throughout the Republican period.

Roman Republican calendar (c. 700 BC or c. 450 BC – 46 BC)
English		Latin		Meaning	Length in days			
English		Latin		Meaning	1st year (cmn.)	2nd year (leap)	3rd year (cmn.)	4th year (leap)
1.	January	I.	Mensis Ianuarius	Month of Janus	29	29	29	29
2.	February	II.	Mensis Februarius	Month of the Februa	28	23	28	23
2.	Intercalary Month	II.	Intercalaris Mensis (Mercedonius)	Month of Wages		27		28
3.	March	III.	Mensis Martius	Month of Mars	31	31	31	31
4.	April	IV.	Mensis Aprilis	Uncertain, possibly month of Aphrodite, of opening (aperire), or the second month (aperilis, meaning next)	29	29	29	29
5.	May	V.	Mensis Maius	Month of Maia	31	31	31	31
6.	June	VI.	Mensis Iunius	Month of Juno	29	29	29	29
7.	July	VII.	Mensis Quintilis	Fifth Month (from the earlier calendar starting in March)	31	31	31	31
8.	August	VIII.	Mensis Sextilis	Sixth Month	29	29	29	29
9.	September	IX.	Mensis September	Seventh Month	29	29	29	29
10.	October	X.	Mensis October	Eighth Month	31	31	31	31
11.	November	XI.	Mensis November	Ninth Month	29	29	29	29
12.	December	XII.	Mensis December	Tenth Month	29	29	29	29
Whole year:					355	377	355	378

According to the later writers Censorinus and Macrobius, to correct the mismatch of the correspondence between months and seasons due to the excess of one day of the Roman average year over the tropical year, the insertion of the intercalary month was modified according to the scheme: common year (355 days), leap year with 23-day February followed by 27-day Mercedonius (377 days), common year, leap year with 23-day February followed by 28-day Mercedonius (378 days), and so on for the first 16 years of a 24-year cycle. In the last 8 years, the intercalation took place with the month of Mercedonius only 27 days, except the last intercalation which did not happen. Hence, there would be a typical common year followed by a leap year of 377 days for the next 6 years and the remaining 2 years would sequentially be common years. The result of this twenty-four-year pattern was of great precision for the time: 365.25 days, as shown by the following calculation:

$\frac{355\times 13+377\times 7+378\times 4}{24}=\frac{8,766}{24}=365\tfrac{1}{4}$

Year length based on sequence of intercalary month
355	377	355	378	355	377	355	378	355	377	355	378
355	377	355	378	355	377	355	377	355	377	355	355

The consuls' terms of office were not always a modern calendar year, but ordinary consuls were elected or appointed annually. The traditional list of Roman consuls used by the Romans to date their years began in 509 BC.

=== Flavian reform ===
Gnaeus Flavius, a secretary (scriba) to censor App. Claudius Caecus, introduced a series of reforms in 304 BC. Their exact nature is uncertain, although he is thought to have begun the custom of publishing the calendar in advance of the month, depriving the priests of some of their power but allowing for a more consistent calendar for official business.

=== Julian reform ===
Julius Caesar, following his victory in his civil war and in his role as pontifex maximus, ordered a reformation of the calendar in 46 BC. This was undertaken by a group of scholars apparently including the Alexandrian Sosigenes and the Roman M. Flavius. Its main lines involved the insertion of ten additional days throughout the calendar and regular intercalation of a single leap day every fourth year to bring the Roman calendar into close agreement with the solar year. The year 46 BC was the last of the old system and included three intercalary months, the first inserted in February and two more—Intercalaris Prior and Posterior—before the kalends of December.

=== Later reforms ===
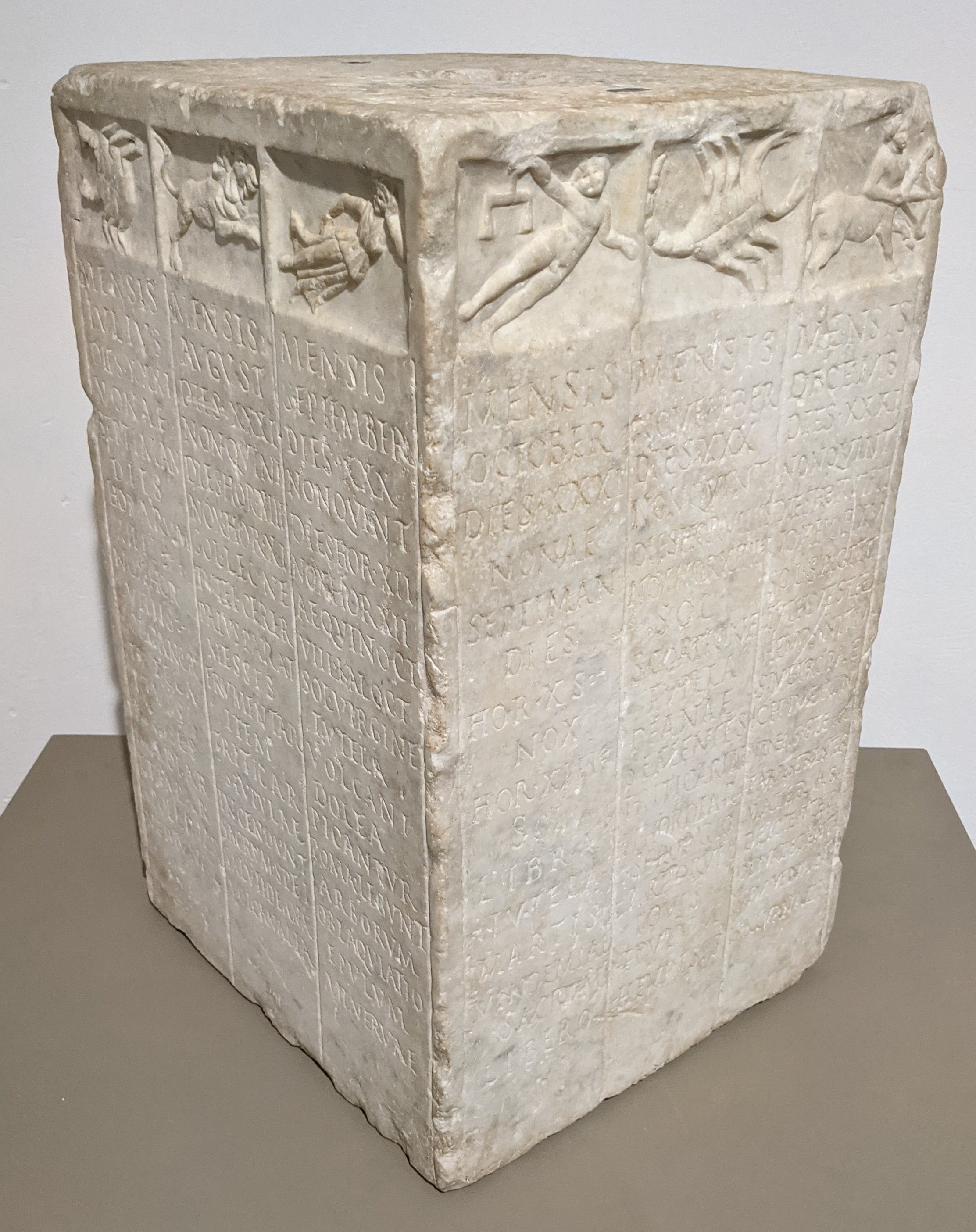
July through December sides of the twelve month Menologium Rusticum Colotianum

After Caesar's assassination, Mark Antony had Caesar's birth month Quintilis renamed July (Iulius) in his honor. After Antony's defeat at Actium, Augustus assumed control of Rome and, finding the priests had (owing to their inclusive counting) been intercalating every third year instead of every fourth, suspended the addition of leap days to the calendar for one or two decades until its proper position had been restored. See Julian calendar: Leap year error. In 8 BC, the plebiscite Lex Pacuvia de Mense Augusto renamed Sextilis August (Augustus) in his honor. (Note: There are some documents which state the month had been renamed as early as 26 or 23 BC, but the date of the Lex Pacuvia is certain.)

In large part, this calendar continued unchanged under the Roman Empire. (Egyptians used the related Alexandrian calendar, which Augustus had adapted from their wandering ancient calendar to maintain its alignment with Rome's.) A few emperors altered the names of the months after themselves or their family, but such changes were abandoned by their successors. Diocletian began the 15-year indiction cycles beginning from the AD 297 census; these became the required format for official dating under Justinian. Constantine formally established the 7-day week by making Sunday an official holiday in 321. Consular dating became obsolete following the abandonment of appointing nonimperial consuls in AD 541. The Roman method of numbering the days of the month never became widespread in the Hellenized eastern provinces and was eventually abandoned by the Byzantine Empire in its calendar.

== Days ==
Roman dates were counted inclusively forward to the next one of three principal days within each month:

- Kalends (Kalendae or Kal.), the first day of each month
- Nones (Nonae or Non.), the seventh day of "full months" (Note: The original 31-day months, i.e. "full", of the Roman calendar were March, May, Quintilis or July, and October.) and fifth day of hollow ones, 8 days before the Ides in every month
- Ides (Idus, variously Eid. or Id.), the 15th day of "full months" and the 13th day of hollow ones, one day earlier than the middle of each month.

These are thought to reflect a prehistoric lunar calendar, with the kalends proclaimed after the sighting of the first sliver of the new crescent moon a day or two after the new moon, the nones occurring on the day of the first-quarter moon, and the ides on the day of the full moon. The kalends of each month were sacred to Juno and the ides to Jupiter. The day before each was known as its eve (pridie); the day after each (postridie) was considered particularly unlucky.

The days of the month were expressed in early Latin using the ablative of time, denoting points in time, in the contracted form "the 6th December Kalends" (VI Kalendis Decembribus). In classical Latin, this use continued for the three principal days of the month but other days were idiomatically expressed in the accusative case, which usually expressed a duration of time, and took the form "6th day before the December Kalends" (ante diem VI Kalendas Decembres). This anomaly may have followed the treatment of days in Greek, reflecting the increasing use of such date phrases as an absolute phrase able to function as the object of another preposition, or simply originated in a mistaken agreement of dies with the preposition ante once it moved to the beginning of the expression. In late Latin, this idiom was sometimes abandoned in favor of again using the ablative of time.

The kalends were the day for payment of debts and the account books (kalendaria) kept for them gave English its word calendar. The public Roman calendars were the fasti, which designated the religious and legal character of each month's days. The Romans marked each day of such calendars with the letters:

- F (fastus, "permissible") on days when it was legal to initiate action in the courts of civil law (dies fasti, "allowed days")
- C (comitialis) on fasti days during which the Roman people could hold assemblies (dies comitiales)
- N (nefastus) on days when political and judicial activities were prohibited (dies nefasti)
- NP (uncertain) (Note: The NP days are sometimes thought to mark days when political and judicial activities were prohibited only until noon, standing for nefastus priore.) on public holidays (feriae)
- QRCF (uncertain) (Note: The QRCF days are sometimes supposed, on the basis of the Fasti Viae Lanza which gives it as Q. Rex C. F., to stand for "Permissible when the King Has Entered the Comitium" (Quando Rex Comitiavit Fas).) on days when the "king" (rex sacrorum) could convene an assembly
- EN (endotercissus, an archaic form of intercissus, "halved") on days when most political and religious activities were prohibited in the morning and evening due to sacrifices being prepared or offered but were acceptable for a period in the middle of the day

Each day was also marked by a letter from A to H to indicate its place within the nundinal cycle of market days.

== Weeks ==
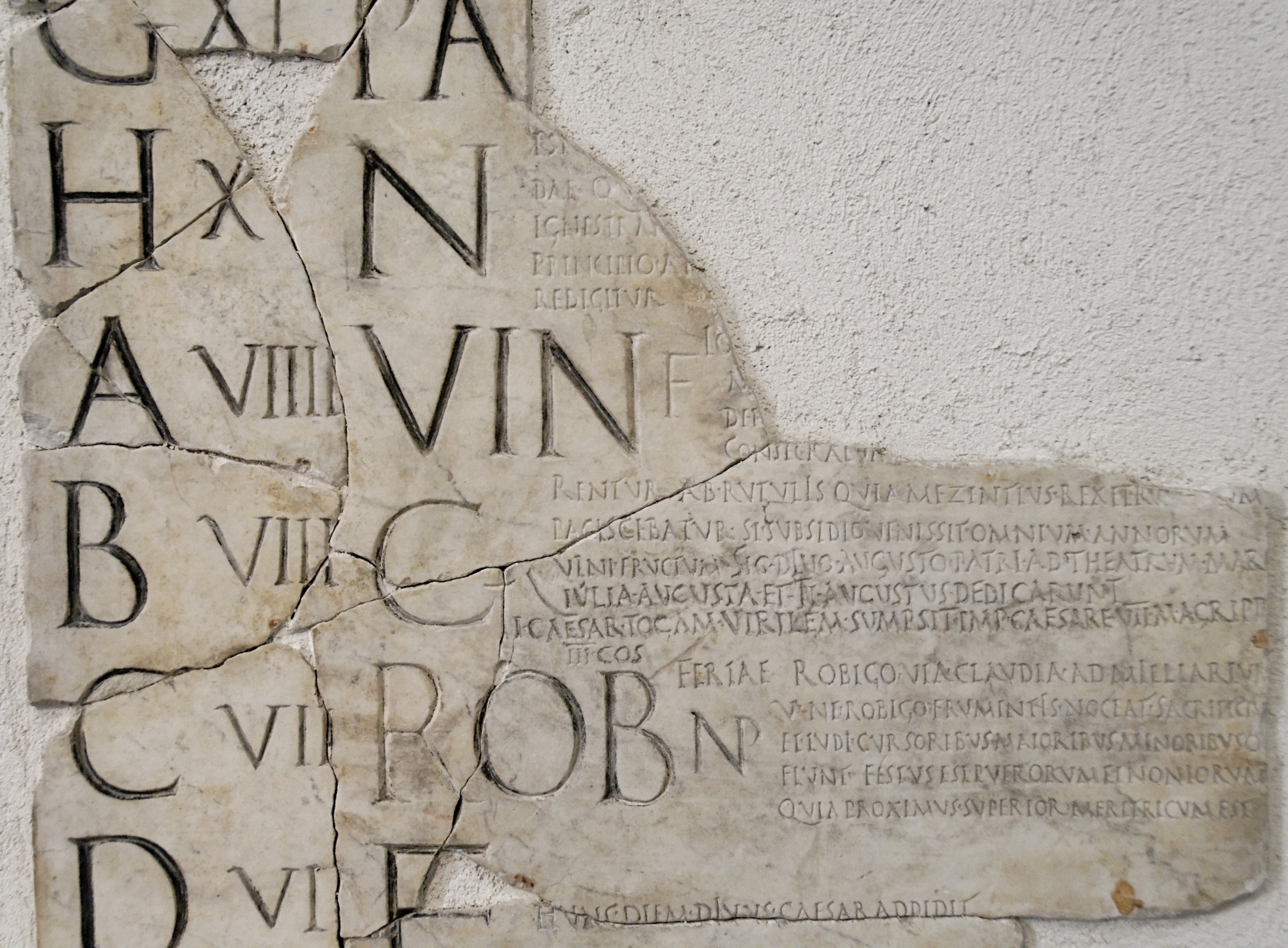
A fragment of the Fasti Praenestini for the month of April (Aprilis), showing its nundinal letters on the left side

The nundinae were the market days which formed a kind of weekend in Rome, Italy, and some other parts of Roman territory. By Roman inclusive counting, they were reckoned as "ninth days" although they actually occurred every eighth day. Because the republican and Julian years were not evenly divisible into eight-day periods, Roman calendars included a column giving every day of the year a nundinal letter from A to H marking its place in the cycle of market days. Each year, the letter used for the markets would shift 2–5 letters along the cycle. As a day when the city swelled with rural plebeians, they were overseen by the aediles and took on an important role in Roman legislation, which was supposed to be announced for three nundinal weeks (between 17 and 24 days) in advance of its coming to a vote. The patricians and their clients sometimes exploited this fact as a kind of filibuster, since the tribunes of the plebs were required to wait another three-week period if their proposals could not receive a vote before dusk on the day they were introduced. Superstitions arose concerning the bad luck that followed a nundinae on the nones of a month or, later, on the first day of January. Intercalation was supposedly used to avoid such coincidences, even after the Julian reform of the calendar.

The 7-day week began to be observed in Italy in the early imperial period, as practitioners and converts to eastern religions introduced Hellenistic and Babylonian astrology, the Jewish Saturday sabbath, and the Christian Lord's Day. The system was originally used for private worship and astrology but had replaced the nundinal week by the time Constantine made Sunday (dies Solis) an official day of rest in AD 321. The hebdomadal week was also reckoned as a cycle of letters from A to G; these were adapted for Christian use as the dominical letters.

== Months ==
The names of Roman months originally functioned as adjectives (e.g., the January kalends occur in the January month) before being treated as substantive nouns in their own right (e.g., the kalends of January occur in January). Some of their etymologies are well-established: January and March honor the gods Janus and Mars; July and August honor Julius Caesar and his successor, the emperor Augustus; and the months Quintilis, Sextilis, September, October, November, and December are archaic adjectives formed from the ordinal numbers from 5 to 10, their position in the calendar when it began around the spring equinox in March. Others are uncertain. February may derive from the Februa festival or its eponymous februa ("purifications, expiatory offerings"), whose name may be either Sabine or preserve an archaic word for sulphuric. April may relate to the Etruscan goddess Apru or the verb aperire ("to open"). May and June may honor Maia and Juno or derive from archaic terms for "senior" and "junior". A few emperors attempted to add themselves to the calendar after Augustus, but without enduring success.

In classical Latin, the days of each month were usually reckoned as:

Days of the month in the Roman Calendar
Days in month			31d	31d	30d	29d	28d
Months before Julian reform			Mar May Jul Oct			Jan Apr Jun Aug Sep Nov Dec	Feb
Months after Julian reform			Mar May Jul Oct	Jan Aug Dec	Apr Jun Sep Nov	(Feb)	Feb
Day name in English	Day name in Latin	Abbr	(Note: The months with 31 days before and after the Julian reform – March, May, Quintilis (July), and October – continued using the old system with their Nones on the 7th and Ides on the 15th, making them different from all other months.)	(Note: The months which changed from 29 to 31 days under the Julian reform – January, Sextilis (August), and December – retained their Nones on the 5th and Ides on the 13th, making them different from the other 31-day months but matching all other months.)	(Note: The months which changed from 29 to 30 days under the Julian reform – April, June, September, and November – retained their Nones on the 5th and Ides on the 13th, making them match all other months except those which had had 31 days before the reform.)	(Note: In leap years late in the imperial period, February was reckoned as a 29 day month with all days lasting 24 hours.)	(Note: In leap years early period after the Julian reform, February had 29 days but was reckoned as a 28 day month by treating the sixth day before the March Kalends as lasting for 48 hours.)
On the Kalends	Kalendis	Kal.	1	1	1	1	1
The day after the Kalends	postridie Kalendas		2	2	2	2	2
The 6th day before the Nones	ante diem sextum Nonas	a.d. VI Non.	2				
The 5th day before the Nones	ante diem quintum Nonas	a.d. V Non.	3				
The 4th day before the Nones	ante diem quartum Nonas	a.d. IV Non.	4	2	2	2	2
The 3rd day before the Nones	ante diem tertium Nonas	a.d. III Non.	5	3	3	3	3
On the day before the Nones	Pridie Nonas	Prid. Non.	6	4	4	4	4
On the Nones	Nonis	Non.	7	5	5	5	5
The day after the Nones	postridie Nonas		8	6	6	6	6
The 8th day before the Ides	ante diem octavum Idus	a.d. VIII Eid.	8	6	6	6	6
The 7th day before the Ides	ante diem septimum Idus	a.d. VII Eid.	9	7	7	7	7
The 6th day before the Ides	ante diem sextum Idus	a.d. VI Eid.	10	8	8	8	8
The 5th day before the Ides	ante diem quintum Idus	a.d. V Eid.	11	9	9	9	9
The 4th day before the Ides	ante diem quartum Idus	a.d. IV Eid.	12	10	10	10	10
The 3rd day before the Ides	ante diem tertium Idus	a.d. III Eid.	13	11	11	11	11
On the day before the Ides	Pridie Idus	Prid. Eid.	14	12	12	12	12
On the Ides	Idibus	Eid.	15	13	13	13	13
The day after the Ides	postridie Idus		16	14	14	14	14
The 19th day before the Kalends	ante diem undevicesimum Kalendas	a.d. XIX Kal.		14			
The 18th day before the Kalends	ante diem duodevicesimum Kalendas	a.d. XVIII Kal.		15	14		
The 17th day before the Kalends	ante diem septimum decimum Kalendas	a.d. XVII Kal.	16	16	15	14	
The 16th day before the Kalends	ante diem sextum decimum Kalendas	a.d. XVI Kal.	17	17	16	15	14
The 15th day before the Kalends	ante diem quintum decimum Kalendas	a.d. XV Kal.	18	18	17	16	15
The 14th day before the Kalends	ante diem quartum decimum Kalendas	a.d. XIV Kal.	19	19	18	17	16
The 13th day before the Kalends	ante diem tertium decimum Kalendas	a.d. XIII Kal.	20	20	19	18	17
The 12th day before the Kalends	ante diem duodecimum Kalendas	a.d. XII Kal.	21	21	20	19	18
The 11th day before the Kalends	ante diem undecimum Kalendas	a.d. XI Kal.	22	22	21	20	19
The 10th day before the Kalends	ante diem decimum Kalendas	a.d. X Kal.	23	23	22	21	20
The 9th day before the Kalends	ante diem nonum Kalendas	a.d. IX Kal.	24	24	23	22	21
The 8th day before the Kalends	ante diem octavum Kalendas	a.d. VIII Kal.	25	25	24	23	22
The 7th day before the Kalends	ante diem septimum Kalendas	a.d. VII Kal.	26	26	25	24	23
The 6th day before the Kalends	ante diem sextum Kalendas	a.d. VI Kal.	27	27	26	25	24 (Note: After the Julian reform until late in the imperial period, this day was reckoned to last 48 hours during a leap year.)
The 5th day before the Kalends	ante diem quintum Kalendas	a.d. V Kal.	28	28	27	26	25
The 4th day before the Kalends	ante diem quartum Kalendas	a.d. IV Kal.	29	29	28	27	26
The 3rd day before the Kalends	ante diem tertium Kalendas	a.d. III Kal.	30	30	29	28	27
On the day before the Kalends	Pridie Kalendas	Prid. Kal.	31	31	30	29	28

Dates after the ides count forward to the kalends of the next month and are expressed as such. For example, March 19 was expressed as "the 14th day before the April Kalends" (a.d. XIV Kal. Apr.), without a mention of March itself. The day after a kalends, nones, or ides was also often expressed as the "day after" (postridie) owing to their special status as particularly unlucky "black days".

The anomalous status of the new 31-day months under the Julian calendar was an effect of Caesar's desire to avoid affecting the festivals tied to the nones and ides of various months. However, because the dates at the ends of the month all counted forward to the next kalends, they were all shifted by one or two days by the change. This created confusion with regard to certain anniversaries. For instance, Augustus's birthday on the 23rd day of September was a.d. VIII Kal. Oct. in the old calendar but a.d. IX Kal. Oct. under the new system. The ambiguity caused honorary festivals to be held on either or both dates.

== Intercalation ==
The Republican calendar only had 355 days, which meant that it would quickly desynchronize from the solar year, causing, for example, agricultural festivals to occur out of season. The Roman solution to this problem was to periodically lengthen the calendar by adding extra days within February. February was broken into two parts, each with an odd number of days. The first part ended with the Terminalia on the 23rd (a.d. VII Kal. Mart.), which was considered the end of the religious year; the five remaining days beginning with the Regifugium on the 24th (a.d. VI Kal. Mart.) formed the second part; and the intercalary month Mercedonius was inserted between them. In such years, the days between the ides and the Regifugium were counted down to either the Intercalary Kalends or to the Terminalia. The intercalary month counted down to nones and ides on its 5th and 13th day in the manner of the other short months. The remaining days of the month counted down towards the March Kalends, so that the end of Mercedonius and the second part of February were indistinguishable to the Romans, one ending on a.d. VII Kal. Mart. and the other picking up at a.d. VI Kal. Mart. and bearing the normal festivals of such dates.

Apparently because of the confusion of these changes or uncertainty as to whether an intercalary month would be ordered, dates after the February ides are attested as sometimes counting down towards the Quirinalia (February 17), the Feralia (February 21), or the Terminalia (February 23) rather than the intercalary or March kalends.

The third-century writer Censorinus says:

When it was thought necessary to add (every two years) an intercalary month of 22 or 23 days, so that the civil year should correspond to the natural (solar) year, this intercalation was in preference made in February, between the Terminalia [23rd] and Regifugium [24th].

The fifth-century writer Macrobius says that the Romans intercalated 22 and 23 days in alternate years; the intercalation was placed after February 23 and the remaining five days of February followed. To avoid the nones falling on a nundine, where necessary an intercalary day was inserted "in the middle of the Terminalia, where they placed the intercalary month". This appears to have been generally correct. In 170 BC, Intercalaris began on the second day after February 23 and, in 167 BC, it began on the day after February 23.

Varro, writing in the first century BC, says "the twelfth month was February, and when intercalations take place the five last days of this month are removed." Since all the days after the Ides of Intercalaris were counted down to the beginning of March, the month had either 27 days (making 377 for the year) or 28 (making 378 for the year).

There is another theory which says that in intercalary years February had 23 or 24 days and Intercalaris had 27. No date is offered for the Regifugium in 378-day years. Macrobius describes a further refinement whereby, in one 8-year period within a 24-year cycle, there were only three intercalary years, each of 377 days. This refinement brings the calendar back in line with the seasons and averages the length of the year to 365.25 days over 24 years.

The Pontifex Maximus determined when an intercalary month was to be inserted. On average, this happened in alternate years. The system of aligning the year through intercalary months broke down at least twice: the first time was during and after the Second Punic War. It led to the reform of the 191 BC Acilian Law on Intercalation, the details of which are unclear, but it appears to have successfully regulated intercalation for over a century. The second breakdown was in the middle of the first century BC and may have been related to the increasingly chaotic and adversarial nature of Roman politics at the time. The position of Pontifex Maximus was not a full-time job; it was held by a member of the Roman elite, who would almost invariably be involved in the machinations of Roman politics. Because the term of office of elected Roman magistrates was defined in terms of a Roman calendar year, a Pontifex Maximus had an incentive to lengthen a year in which he or his allies were in power or shorten a year in which his political opponents held office.

Although there are many stories to interpret the intercalation, a period of 22 or 23 days is always 1/4 synodic month short. Obviously, the month beginning shifts forward (from the new moon, to the third quarter, to the full moon, to the first quarter, back the new moon) after intercalation.

== Years ==
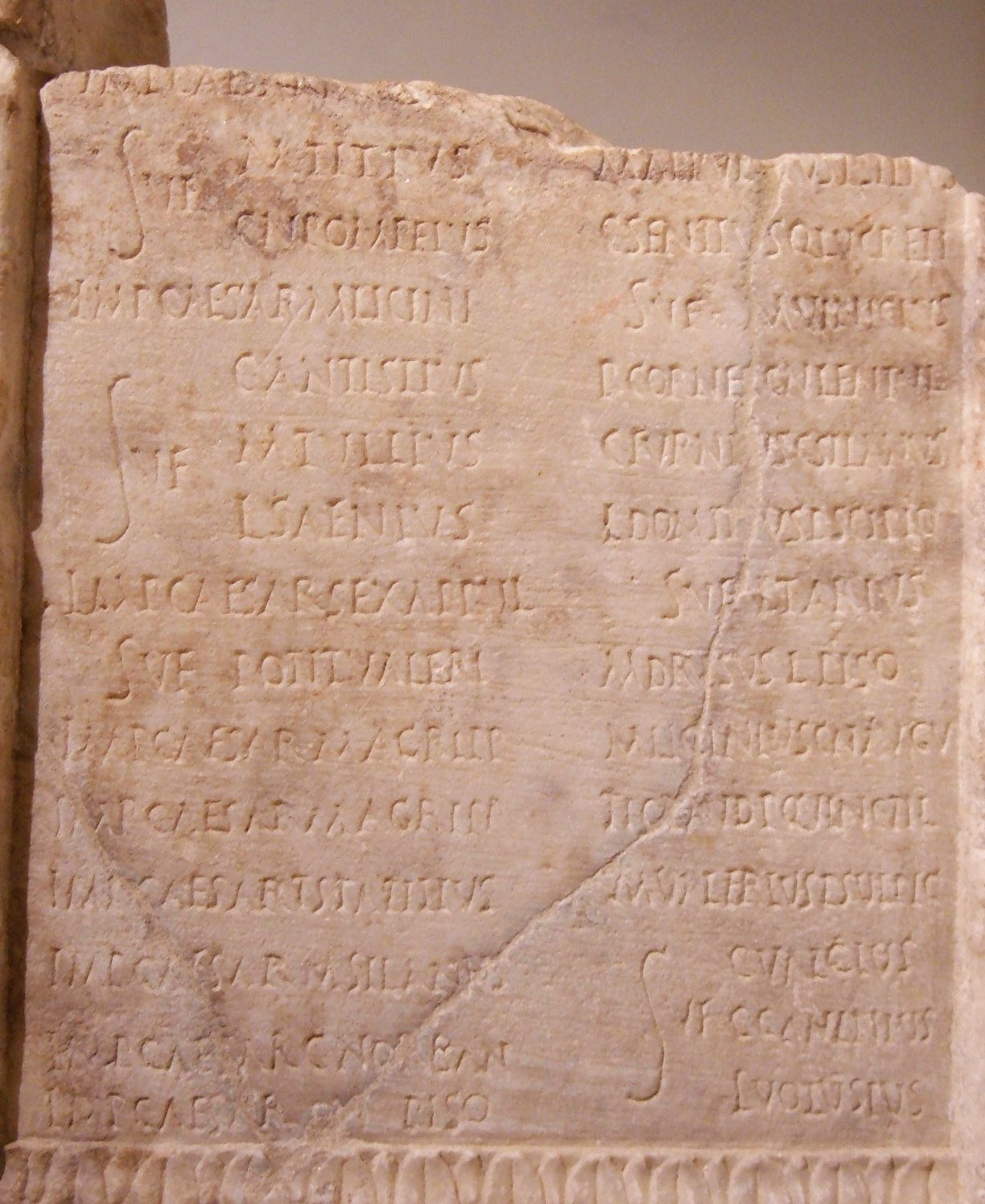
A fragment of an imperial consular list

As mentioned above, Rome's legendary 10-month calendar notionally lasted for 304 days but was usually thought to make up the rest of the solar year during an unorganized winter period. The unattested but almost certain lunar year and the pre-Julian civil year were 354 or 355 days long, with the difference from the solar year more or less corrected by an irregular intercalary month. The Julian year was 365 days long, with a leap day doubled in length every fourth year, almost equivalent to the present Gregorian system.

The calendar era before and under the Roman kings is uncertain but dating by regnal years was common in antiquity. Under the Roman Republic, from 509 BC, years were most commonly described in terms of their reigning ordinary consuls. (Temporary and honorary consuls were sometimes elected or appointed but were not used in dating.) Consular lists were displayed on the public calendars. After the institution of the Roman Empire, regnal dates based on the emperors' terms in office became more common. Some historians of the later republic and early imperial eras dated from the legendary founding of the city of Rome (ab urbe condita or avc). Varro's date for this was 753 BC but other writers used different dates, varying by several decades. Such dating was, however, never widespread. After the consuls waned in importance, most Roman dating was regnal or followed Diocletian's 15-year Indiction tax cycle. These cycles were not distinguished, however, so that "year 2 of the indiction" may refer to any of 298, 313, 328, &c. The Orthodox subjects of the Byzantine Empire used various Christian eras, including those based on Diocletian's persecutions, Christ's incarnation, and the supposed age of the world.

The Romans did not have records of their early calendars but, like modern historians, assumed the year originally began in March on the basis of the names of the months following June. The consul M. Fulvius Nobilior (r. 189 BC) wrote a commentary on the calendar at his Temple of Hercules Musarum that claimed January had been named for Janus because the god faced both ways, suggesting it had been instituted as a first month. It was, however, usually said to have been instituted along with February, whose nature and festivals suggest it had originally been considered the last month of the year. The consuls' term of office—and thus the order of the years under the republic—seems to have changed several times. Their inaugurations were finally moved to January 1(Kal. Ian.) in 153 BC to allow Q. Fulvius Nobilior to attack Segeda in Spain during the Celtiberian Wars, before which they had occurred on March 15 (Eid. Mart.). There is reason to believe the inauguration date had been May 1 during the 3rd century BC until 222 BC and Livy mentions earlier inaugurations on May 15 (Eid. Mai.), July 1 (Kal. Qui.), August 1 (Kal. Sex.), October 1(Kal. Oct.), and December 15 (Eid. Dec.). Under the Julian calendar, the year began on January 1 but years of the Indiction cycle began on September 1.

In addition to Egypt's separate calendar, some provinces maintained their records using a local era. Africa dated its records sequentially from 39 BC; Spain from AD 38. This dating system continued as the Spanish era used in medieval Spain.

== Conversion to Julian or Gregorian dates ==
The continuity of names from the Roman to the Gregorian calendar can lead to the mistaken belief that Roman dates correspond to Julian or Gregorian ones. In fact, the essentially complete list of Roman consuls allows general certainty of years back to the establishment of the Roman Republic but the uncertainty as to the end of lunar dating and the irregularity of Roman intercalation means that dates which can be independently verified are invariably weeks to months outside of their "proper" place. Two astronomical events dated by Livy show the calendar four months out of alignment with the proleptic Julian date in 190 BC and two months out of alignment in 168 BC. Thus, "the year of the consulship of Publius Cornelius Scipio Africanus and Publius Licinius Crassus" (usually given as "205 BC") actually began on March 15, 205 BC, and ended on March 14, 204 BC, according to the Roman calendar but may have begun as early as November or December 206 BC owing to its misalignment. Even following the establishment of the Julian calendar, the leap years were not applied correctly by the Roman priests, meaning dates are a few days out of their "proper" place until a few decades into Augustus's reign.

Given the paucity of records regarding the state of the calendar and its intercalation, historians have reconstructed the correspondence of Roman dates to their Julian and Gregorian equivalents from disparate sources. There are detailed accounts of the decades leading up to the Julian reform, particularly the speeches and letters of Cicero, which permit an established chronology back to about 58 BC. The nundinal cycle and a few known synchronisms—e.g., a Roman date in terms of the Attic calendar and Olympiad—are used to generate contested chronologies back to the start of the First Punic War in 264 BC. Beyond that, dates are roughly known based on clues such as the dates of harvests and seasonal religious festivals. French scientist Urbain Le Verrier in his Concordance des Dates de l’ancient Calendrier Romain avec le Style Julien pour les Années de Rome 691-709 (1866) devised charts to convert old Roman calendar dates into Julian ones. They were adopted by Napoleon III and Eugène Stoffel. However, Le Verrier mistakenly assumed that Julius Caesar in 46 BC intercalated only 67 days instead of 90. Le Verrier also mistakenly concluded that the years 56 BC and 54 BC were intercalary.

== See also ==
- List of calendars
- Julian, Alexandrian, Byzantine, & Gregorian calendars
- Fasti, menologia rustica, and the Calendar of 354
- List of Roman consuls and ab urbe condita dating
- General Roman Calendar of the Catholic Church
- Roman festivals
- Undecimber
