= Terminalia (festival) =

Ancient Roman festival for god Terminus

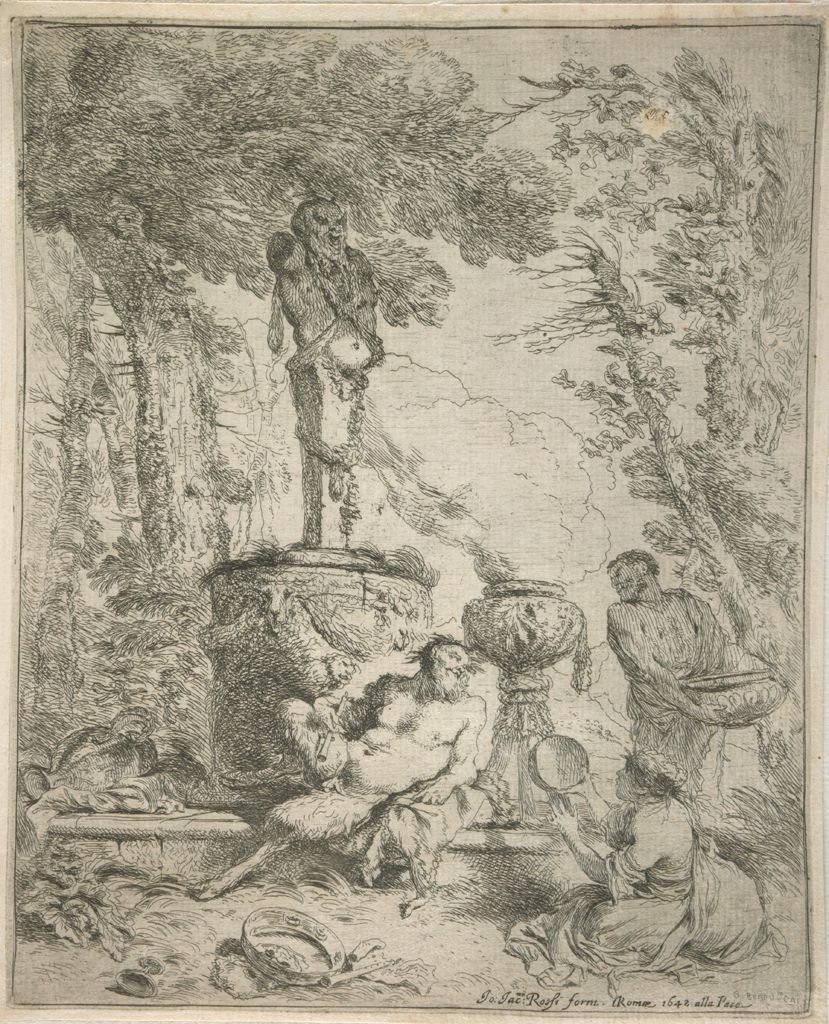
- The Feast Before the Altar of Terminus by Giovanni Benedetto Castiglione (1642)
- Observed by: Roman Republic, Roman Empire
- Type: Classical Roman religion
- Celebrations: Feasting, sacrifices, singing
- Observances: Public sacrifice for the god Terminus at the sixth milestone towards the city of Laurentum
- Date: February 23

Terminalia (Ancient Greek: Τερμινάλια) was an ancient Roman festival in honour of the god Terminus, who presided over boundaries. His statue was merely a stone or post stuck in the ground to distinguish between properties. His worship is said to have been instituted by Numa who ordered that every one should mark the boundaries of his landed property by stones to be consecrated to Jupiter Terminalis, and at which every year sacrifices were to be offered at the festival of the Terminalia. On the festival the two owners of adjacent property crowned the statue with garlands and raised a crude altar, on which they offered up some corn, honeycombs, and wine, and sacrificed a lamb or a suckling pig. They concluded with singing the praises of the god. The public festival in honour of this god was celebrated at the sixth milestone on the road towards Laurentum doubtless because this was originally the extent of the Roman territory in that direction.

The festival of the Terminalia was celebrated a. d. VII. Kal. Mart. (March 1st), or the 23rd of February on the day before the Regifugium. The Terminalia was celebrated on the last day of the old Roman year, whence some derive its name. We know that February was the last month of the Roman year, and that when the intercalary month Mercedonius was added, the last five days of February were added to the intercalary month, making the 23rd of February the last day of the year. When Cicero in a letter to Atticus says, Accepi tuas litteras a. d. V. Terminalia (i.e. Feb. 19), he uses this mode of defining a date, because being then in Cilicia he did not know whether any intercalation had been inserted that year.

The central Terminus of Rome (to which all roads led) was the god's ancient shrine on the Capitoline Hill. The temple of Jupiter, king of the gods, had to be built around it (with a hole in the ceiling as Terminus demanded open-air sacrifices) by the city's last king, Tarquinius Superbus, who had closed down other shrines on the site to make room for this prestigious project. But the augurs had read into the flight patterns of birds that the god Terminus refused to be moved, which was taken as a sign of stability for the city.

== See also ==
- Februarius
- Amburbium
