= Menologia rustica =

A menologium rusticum (pl. menologia rustica), also known by other names, was a publicly displayed month-by-month inscription of the Roman calendar with notes on the farming activities appropriate for each part of the year. Two versions were recovered in Rome during the Italian Renaissance, the Menologium Rusticum Colotianum and the Menologium Rusticum Vallense. The first is now held by the Naples Museum and the second has been lost. Both of the known examples of the style appear to copy a separate original, include a sundial for tracking the hours of the day, and prominently display astrological information for each month. The original was probably carved sometime during the 1st century. In addition to these pillar-style menologia, the name is also sometimes applied to fasti and other wall calendars that include similar agricultural details in their coverage of the year.

== Names ==
Menologium rusticum is Latin for "rural menologium", from Greek menológion (μηνολόγιον) meaning a monthly record. The name was given to the two known inscriptions by Mommsen in the 1st volume of the Corpus Inscriptionum Latinarum. They are also sometimes described as agricultural calendars, rustic calendars (German: Bauernkalender), or as a Roman farmers' almanac. Broughton cautioned against overemphasizing the rustic nature of the surviving examples of the genre, however, given their expensive material, mathematical detail, and—most importantly—the omission of most of the principal agricultural festivals from the era of their creation, including the Cerialia, Fordicidia, Robigalia, and Vinalia.

== Menologium Rusticum Colotianum ==
The Menologium Rusticum Colotianum (CIL VI 2305, EDR 143318) is a short four-sided marble pillar with a hole at the top, possibly for a sundial gnomon. It is inscribed with information about each month of the year, organized into twelve columns with three on each side. Its height is 66.4 cm (26.1 in) and its width is 41.3 cm (16.3 in) in one direction and 38.7 cm (15.2 in) in the other. Each column contains:

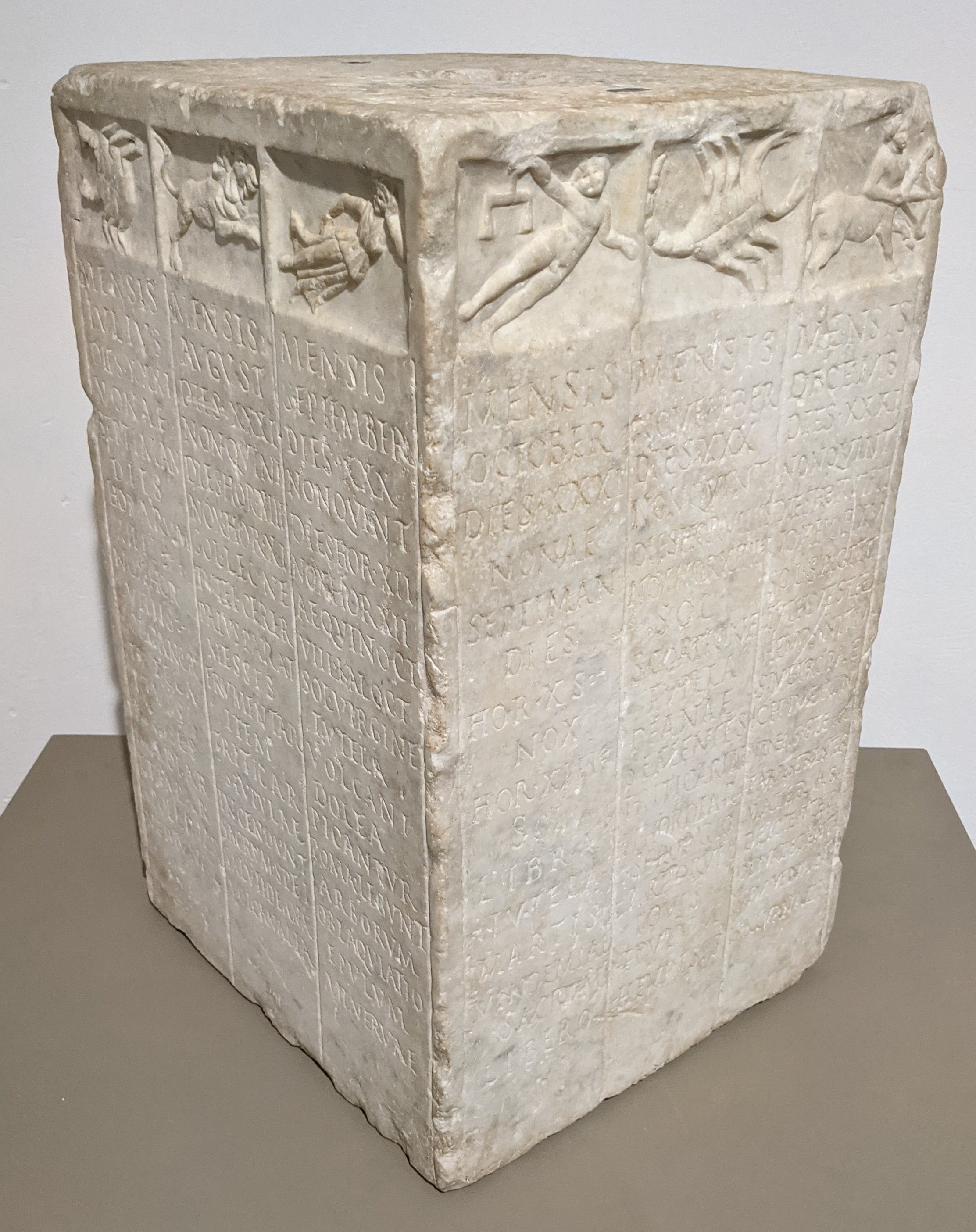
July through December sides of the Menologium Rusticum Colotianum

- An illustration of the month's chief zodiac sign
- The month's name
- Its number of days
- Its nones
- Its usual division of hours between day and night
- The chief astrological house through which the sun has passed
- Its tutelary deity in the Roman pantheon
- Its usual agricultural tasks
- Its chief festivals

It has been dated to AD 19–65 by Salzman and to 36–100 by Patrich, although it appears to be a copy of an earlier original work shared with the Menologium Rusticum Vallense and may have been made at a later date.

It was rediscovered in the garden of Angelo Colocci in the Campus Martius in Rome in the early 1500s and first described by Fabricius in 1549, who happened to be Colocci's neighbor at the time. It became part of the Farnese Collection established by Pope Paul III and was transferred to Naples by King Ferdinand IV in 1787. It is now held by the National Archaeological Museum in Naples (Inv 2632).

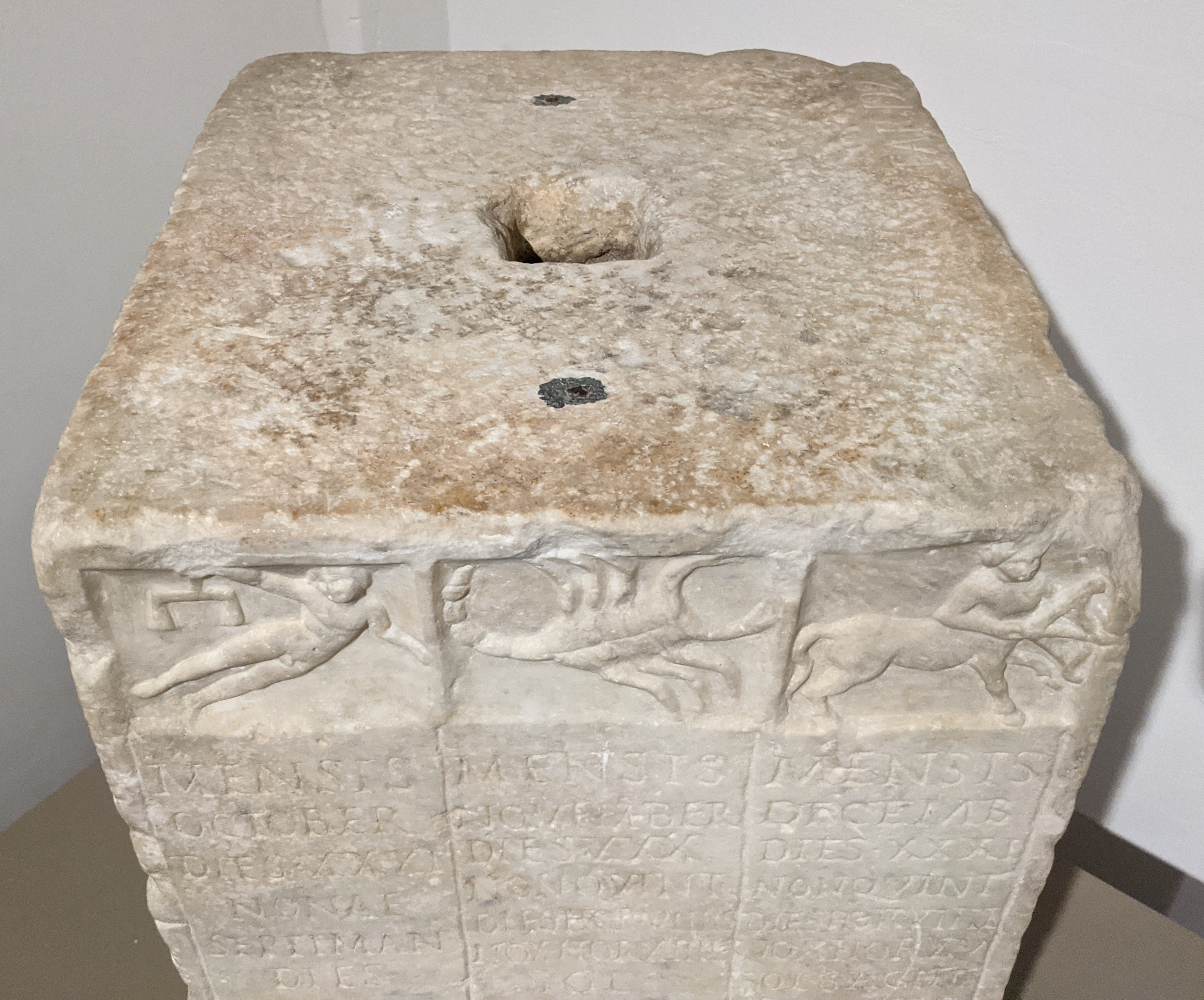
Top

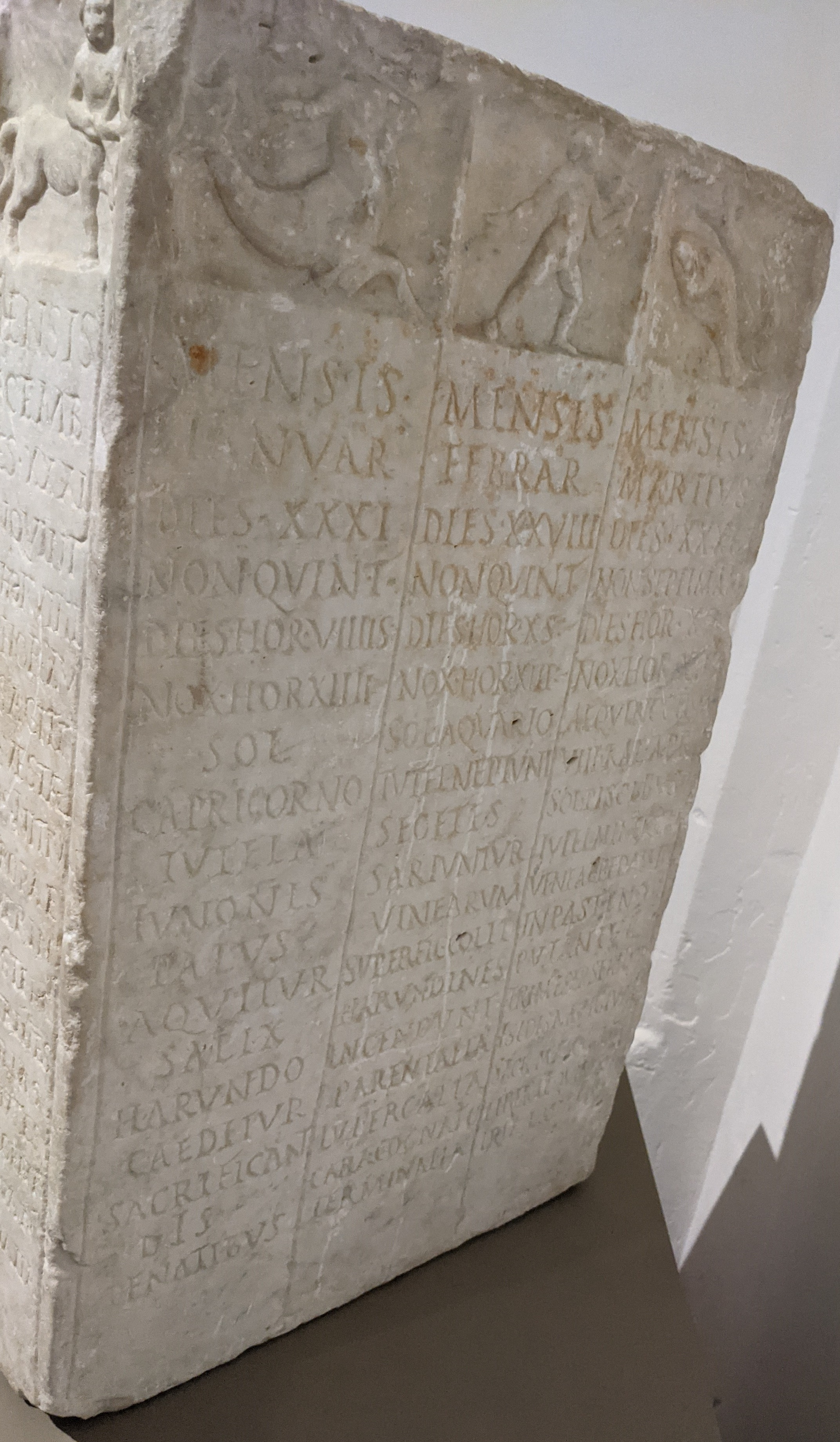
January–March

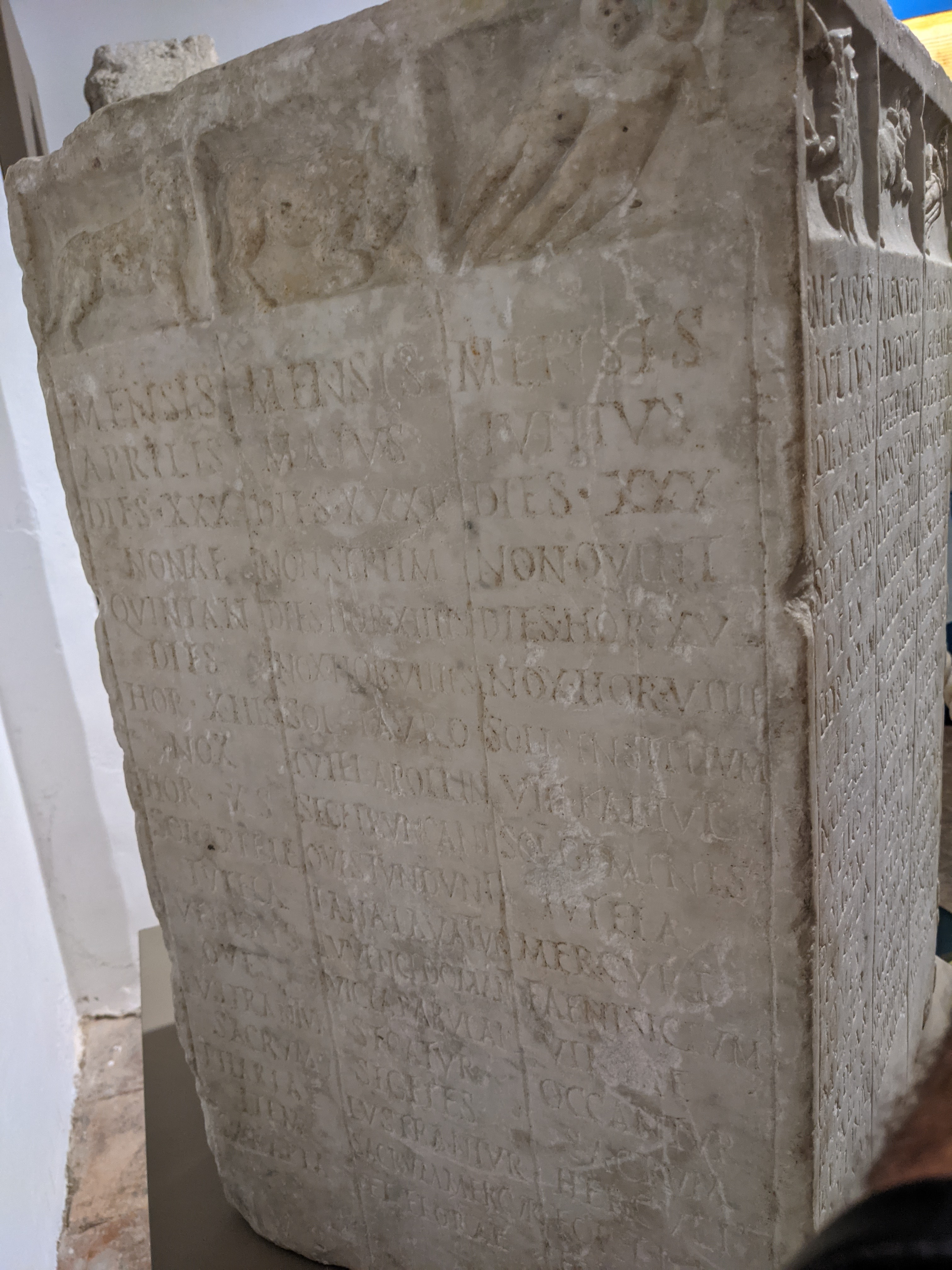
April–June

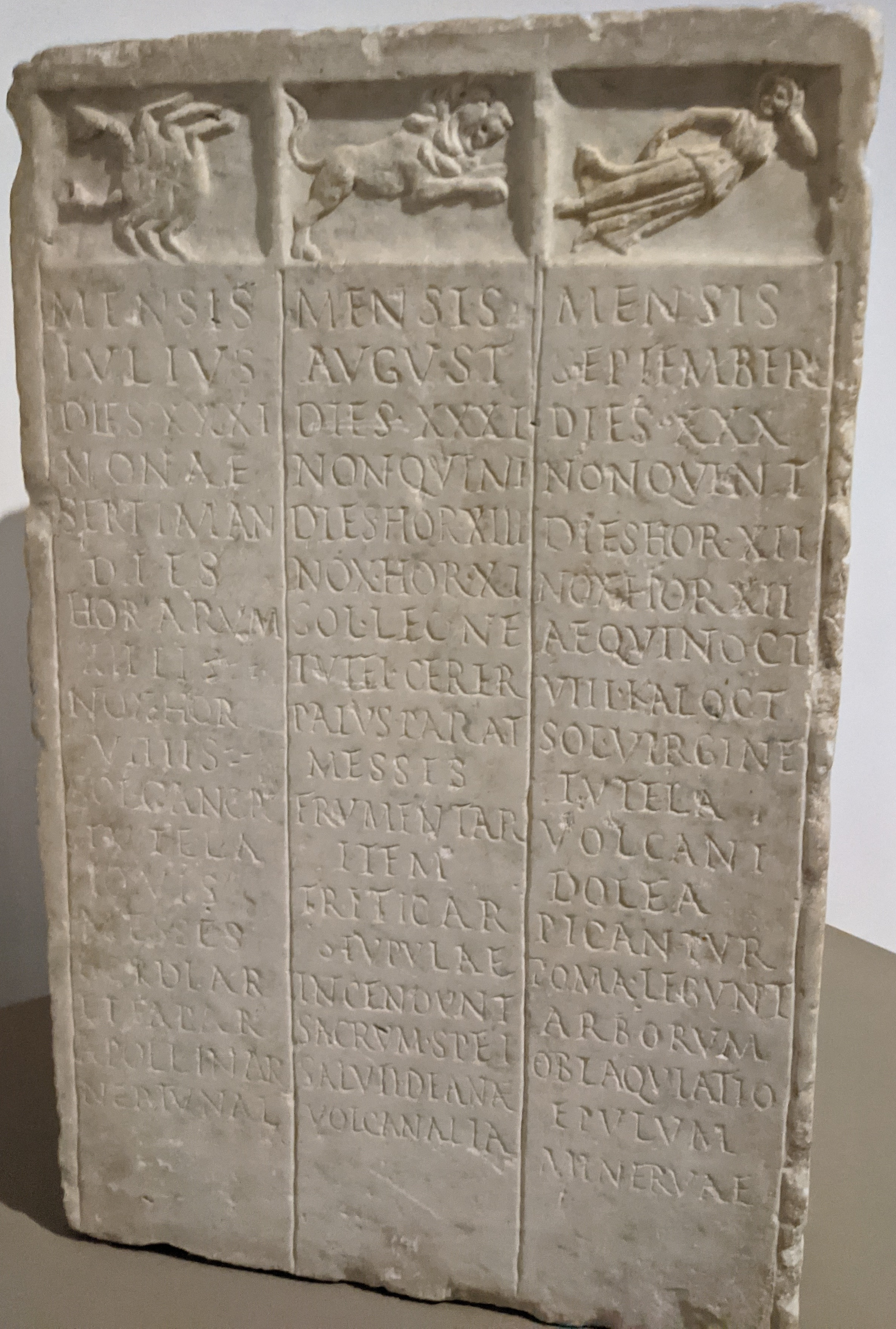
July–September

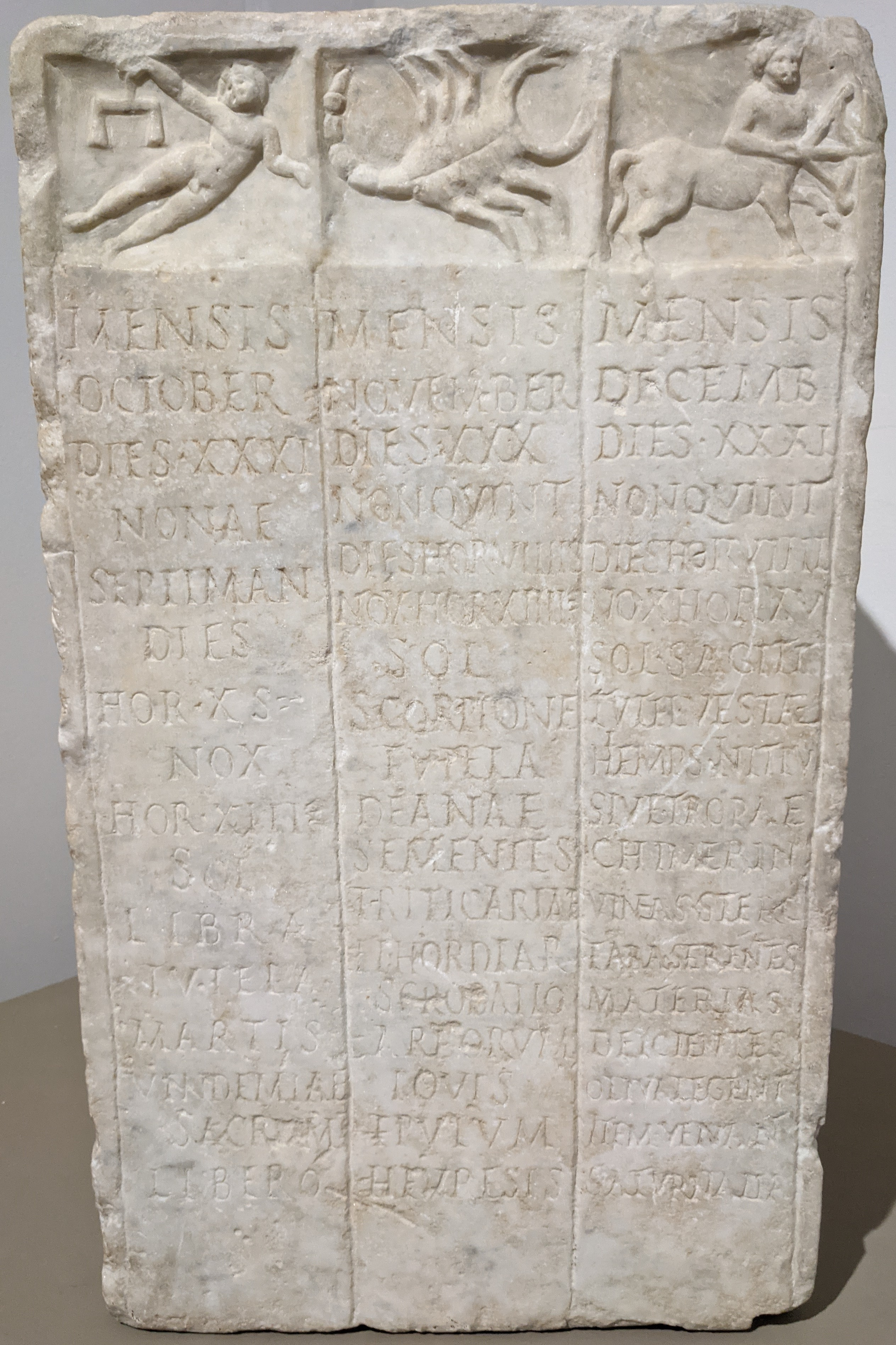
October–December

== Menologium Rusticum Vallense ==
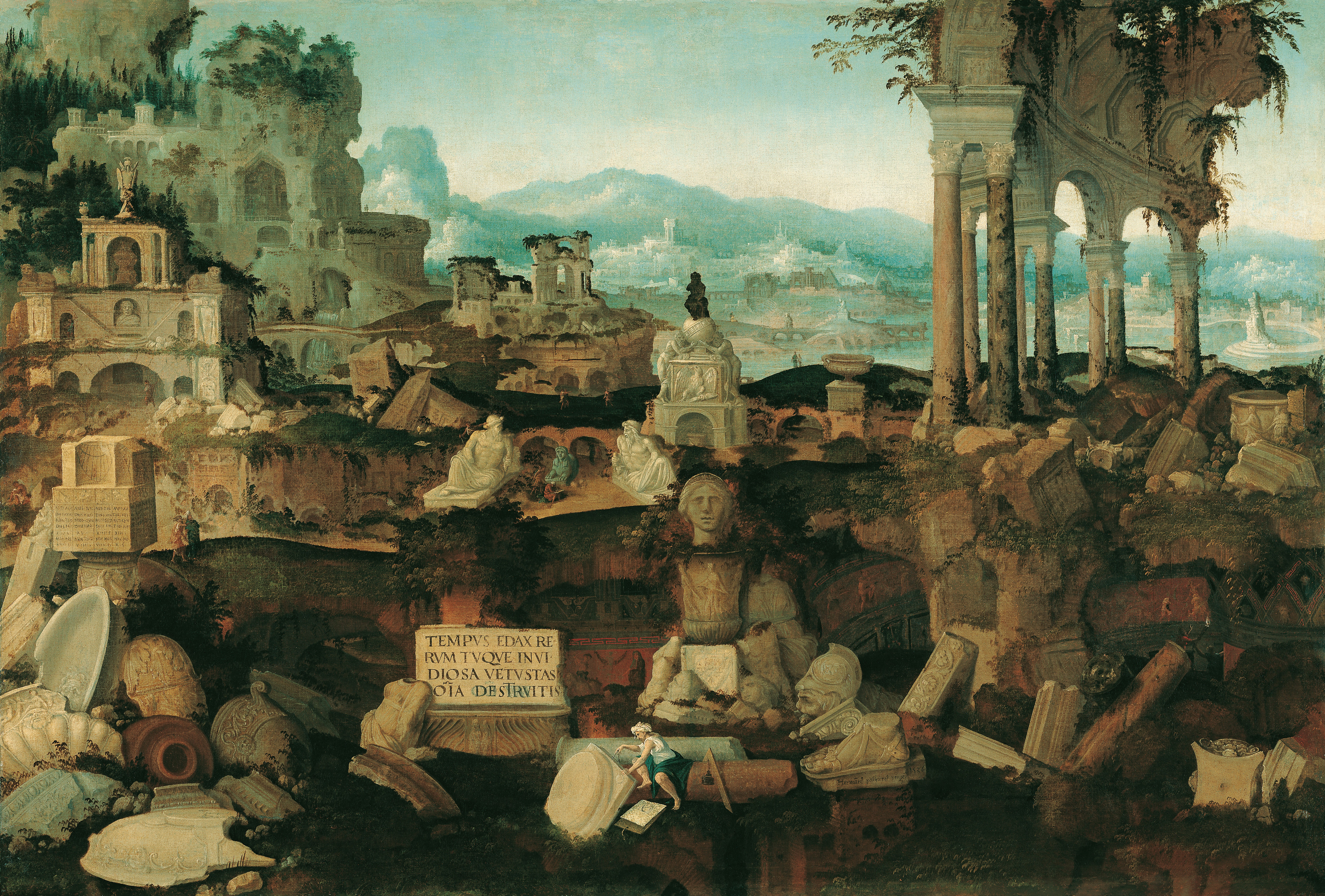
Herman Posthumus's 1536 Tempus Edax Rerum, prominently featuring the Monumentum Rusticum Vallense

The Menologium Rusticum Vallense (CIL VI 2306) was a short four-sided marble pillar with an inset horologium or concave sundial. It was inscribed with similar information about each month of the year, although its twelve columns were organized into sets of four on three sides with the fourth left blank. Despite its cosmetic differences, however, it seems to derive with the Colotian calendar from a single source.

The pillar was discovered before 1480 in the Circus Flaminius area of Rome or in a ruinous old church "apud Augustam", usually taken to indicate the Mausoleum of Augustus. (The Solarium was nearby.) It was held by Andrea della Valle at his Palazzo di Giove. (Note: The Palazzo di Giove (Italian for "Palace of Jove") was named for the large bust of Jupiter over its front door.) Its artwork and details on Roman daily life and science made it one of the chief treasures of the collection. It featured prominently in Herman Posthumus's 1536 Tempus Edax Rerum (Latin for "Time, Devourer of All Things"), where it is used as an embodiment of time. The lower parts of its face are covered, removing the Roman festivals from the calendrical information and further emphasizing the painting's theme of inevitable loss. The della Valle collection was purchased in 1584 by Ferdinando de' Medici and subsequently broken up and dispersed among the various Medici estates. Lost by the early 20th century.

== Others ==
Villas on working estates often displayed mosaics and wall paintings depicting seasonal or monthly agricultural activities, with elaborate examples serving as a kind of menologia rustica.

In 1966, archeologists excavating under Maria Maggiore on the Esquiline Hill in Rome found the remains of a Roman building that included a wall decorated with an imperial calendar with fasti and agricultural annotations and illustrations, which has been described as a menologium rusticum.

== Scholarship ==
Various classical scholars have used the menologia rustica in their work on the Roman calendar, including Fowler and Frazer. Johnson has even conjectured that the four-sided shape of the menologia preserved an original four-month Roman "year" or festival cycle. Aside from their recovery within Rome, Wissowa had allowed for such speculation by affirming that the menologia and their exemplar appeared to have been created with Roman farmers in mind, pointing out the mentions of temple foundation dates, the correspondence of the solar information with Rome's latitude, and the suitability of the stated times for agricultural work around Rome.

Against this, Broughton noted that Italy had adopted Rome's calendar by the imperial period and that the exactness of the information to within a quarter of an hour for certain months—even if it were perfectly accurate—could not establish location any more narrowly than within a range of 4 degrees of latitude, a distance allowing for any location between Rimini and Brindisi. Such exactness and reliability is undermined, however, since the calculations for the separate months do not balance across the year. Finally, the agricultural seasons provided do not match ancient or modern agriculture in the immediate vicinity of Rome at all. Instead, as had already been noted by Huschke, the very late harvests described seem to correspond with northern Italy, villages within the Apennines, or some other province entirely. As such, the calendars cannot be assumed to represent the Roman schedule of their own time, let alone used without care for historical analysis.

== See also ==
- Roman calendar & agriculture
- Fasti & Roman festivals
- Almanac
