= Regifugium =

Festival on February 24 in Ancient Rome

The Regifugium ("Flight of the King") or Fugalia ("Festival of the Flight") was an annual religious festival that took place in ancient Rome every February 24 (Latin: a.d. VI Kal. Mart.).

== History ==
Varro and Ovid traced the observance to the flight of the last king of Rome, Tarquinius Superbus, in 510 BC. In his Fasti, Ovid offers the longest surviving account of the observance:

Now I must tell of the flight of the King, six days from the end of the month. (Note: Actually five days, but reckoned inclusively.) The last of the Tarquins possessed the Roman nation, an unjust man, but nevertheless strong in war. (Note: Latin: Nunc mihi dicenda est regis fuga. Traxit ab illa sextus ab extremo nomina mense dies. Ultima Tarquinius Romanæ gentis habebat regna, vir iniustus, fortis ad arma tamen.)

Plutarch holds that the rex sacrorum played as a substitute for the former king of Rome in various religious rituals. The rex held no civic or military role, but nevertheless was bound to offer a public sacrifice in the Comitia on this date. The "flight of the king" was the swift exit the proxy king was required to make from that place of public business. It may be that the two versions are to be reconciled by taking the "flight" of the rex sacrorum as a reenactment of the expulsion of Tarquinius.

== See also ==
- Terminalia and other Roman festivals
