= Mercedonius =

Intercalary month of the Roman calendar

Mercedonius (Latin for "Work Month"), (Note: All Roman month names began as adjectives modifying the explicit or implicit word "month" (Latin: mensis) before beginning to be treated as nouns in their own right. Mercedonius seems to derive from merces, meaning "wages".) also known as Mercedinus, Interkalaris or Intercalaris (Latin: mensis intercalaris), was the intercalary month of the Roman calendar. The resulting leap year was either 377 or 378 days long. It theoretically occurred every two (or occasionally three) years, but was sometimes avoided or employed by the Roman pontiffs for political reasons regardless of the state of the solar year. Mercedonius was eliminated by Julius Caesar when he introduced the Julian calendar in 45 BC.

== History ==
This month, instituted according to Roman tradition by Numa Pompilius, was supposed to be inserted every two or three years to align the conventional 355-day Roman year with the solar year. (Note: Livy: "The lunar year of 354 days fell short of the solar year by 11 1/4 days: In 8 years this amounted to 90 days or three months. These 90 days he divided into two months of 22 and two months of 23 days, and introduced them alternately every second year for two octennial periods: every third octennial period, however, Numa intercalated only ... three months ... because he adopted 355 days as the length of his lunar year". The same theory is proposed by Macrobius. Plutarch wrote: "Numa reckoned the variation to consist of eleven days, as the lunar year contains 354 days, and the solar year 365. He doubled those eleven days and introduced them every other year, after February, as an intercalary month, twenty-two days in duration, which was called by the Romans Mercedinus.")

The decision of whether to insert the intercalary month was made by the pontifex maximus, supposedly based on observations to ensure the best possible correspondence with the seasons. (Note: "Their [intercalary months'] management was left to the pontiffs – ad metam eandem solis unde orsi essent-dies congruerent ("that the days might correspond to the same starting-point of the sun in the heavens whence they had set out").) However, the pontifex maximus would normally be an active politician, and the decision would often be manipulated to allow friends to stay in office longer or force enemies out early. Such unpredictable intercalation meant that dates following the month of Februarius could not be known in advance, and further to this, Roman citizens living outside Rome would often not know the current date.

The exact mechanism is not clearly specified in ancient sources. Some scholars (Note: such as L.C. Ideler, H.G. Liddell, E.J. Bickerman, and the staff writers of Encyclopædia Britannica.) hold that in intercalary years February's length was fixed at 23 days and it was followed by a variable-length mensis intercalaris with 27 or 28 days. This view is followed in generalist surveys of calendrical history.

However, following a discussion of intercalation by Michels (1967) some specialist studies of the pre-Julian calendar published since 1967 claim that in intercalary years Februarius was set at either 23 or 24 days, which was followed by an intercalary month of 27 days.

Whichever interpretation is correct, the days a.d. VI Kal. Mart. to Prid. Kal. Mart., normally referring to the end of February, were in intercalary years the concluding days of the mensis intercalaris.

The month was eliminated by Julius Caesar with his revised calendar in 45 BC.

== See also ==
- Roman Calendar and Julian calendar § Motivation
- Adar
- Undecimber
