= Maius =

Roman month

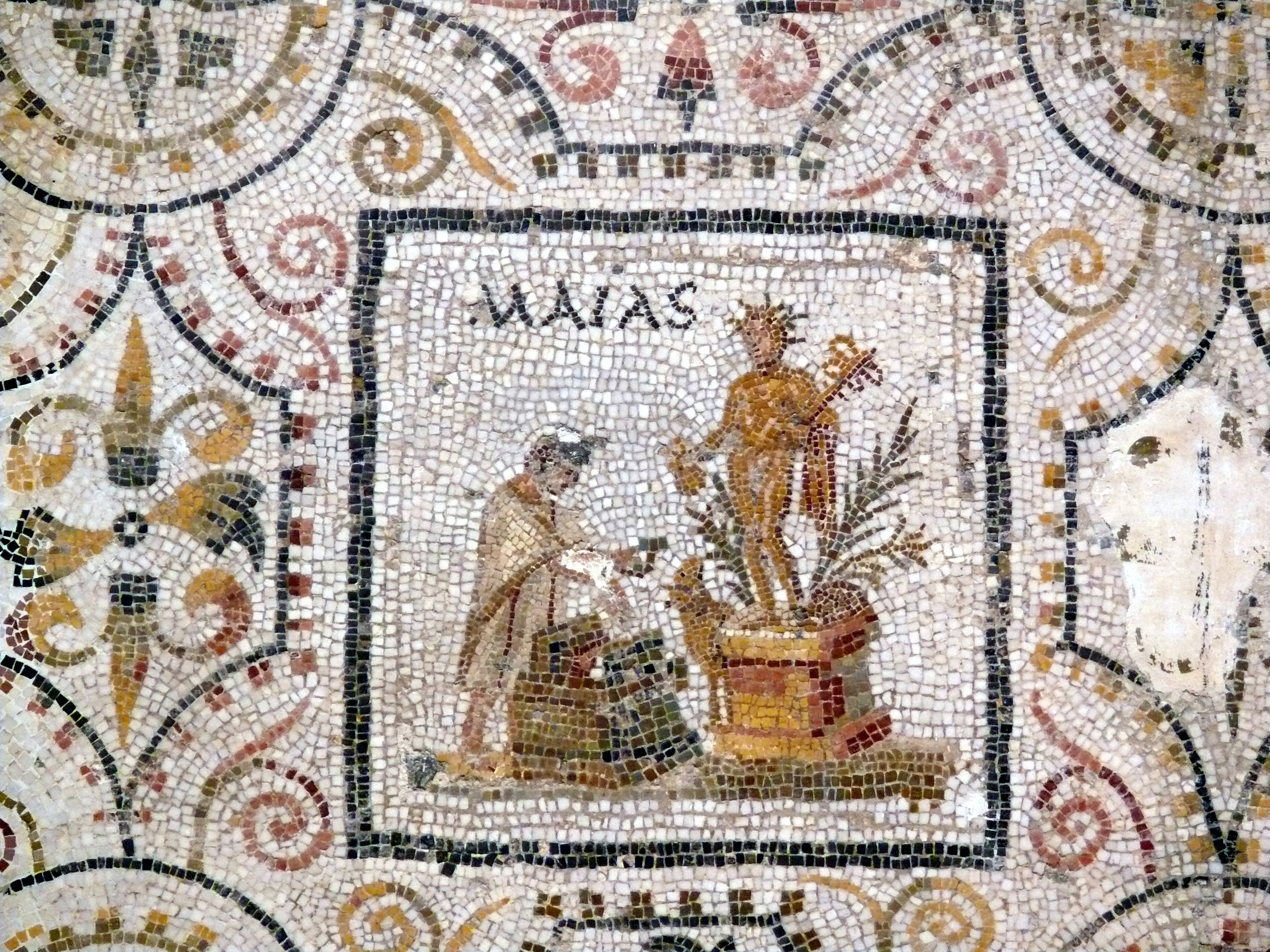
May is represented by the veneration of Mercury on this panel from a Roman mosaic of the months (from El Djem, Tunisia, first half of 3rd century AD)

Maius or mensis Maius (May) was the third month of the ancient Roman calendar in the classical period, following Aprilis (April) and preceding Iunius (June). On the oldest Roman calendar that had begun with March, it was the third of ten months in the year. May had 31 days.

The Romans considered May an infelicitous month. Although it began with one of the most notoriously licentious holidays of the Roman calendar, the Games of Flora (Ludi Florae), the middle of the month was devoted to propitiating the lemures, the restless shades of the dead.

== Dates ==
The Romans did not number days of a month sequentially from the 1st through the last day. Instead, they counted back from the three fixed points of the month: the Nones (5th or 7th, depending on the length of the month), the Ides (13th or 15th), and the Kalends (1st) of the following month. Thus the last day of May was the pridie Kalendas Iunias, "day before the Kalends of June". Roman counting was inclusive; May 9 was ante diem VII Idūs Maias, "the 7th day before the Ides (15th) of May," usually abbreviated a.d. VII Id. Mai. (or with the a.d. omitted altogether); May 23 was X Kal. Iun., "the 10th day before the Kalends of June."

On the calendar of the Roman Republic and early Principate, each day was marked with a letter to denote its religiously lawful status. In May, these were:

- F for dies fasti, days when it was legal to initiate action in the courts of civil law;
- C, for dies comitalis, a day on which the Roman people could hold assemblies (comitia), elections, and certain kinds of judicial proceedings;
- N for dies nefasti, when these political activities and the administration of justice were prohibited;
- NP, the meaning of which remains elusive, but which marked feriae, public holidays;
- QRCF (perhaps for quando rex comitiavit fas), a day when it was religiously permissible for the rex (probably the priest known as the rex sacrorum) to call for an assembly.

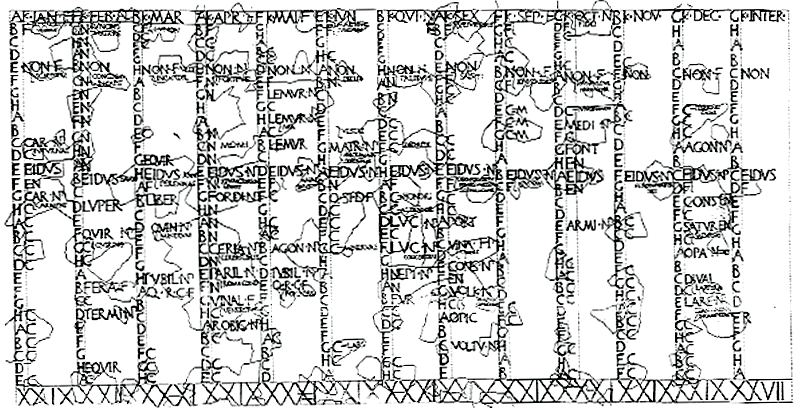
Drawing of the fragmentary Fasti Antiates, a pre-Julian calendar showing Maius (abbreviated MAI) at the top of the fifth column

By the late 2nd century AD, extant calendars no longer show days marked with these letters, probably in part as a result of calendar reforms undertaken by Marcus Aurelius. Days were also marked with nundinal letters in cycles of A B C D E F G H, to mark the "market week" (these are omitted in the table below).

On a dies religiosus, individuals were not to undertake any new activity, nor do anything other than tend to the most basic necessities. A dies natalis was an anniversary such as a temple founding or rededication, sometimes thought of as the "birthday" of a deity. During the Imperial period, the birthdays and anniversaries of the emperor and his family gained prominence as Roman holidays. After the mid-1st century AD, a number of dates are added to calendars for spectacles and games (ludi) held in honor of various deities in the venue called a "circus" (ludi circenses). After the time of Constantine, the first emperor to convert to Christianity, sacrifices were omitted from the ludi. In the mid-4th century, games celebrating the victories of the Constantinian dynasty were held May 4–9 (the Ludi Maximati) and May 13–17 (Ludi Persici).

Festivals marked in large letters on extant fasti, represented by festival names in all capital letters on the table, are thought to have been the most ancient holidays, becoming part of the calendar before 509 BC. The Ambarvalia, a "moveable feast" (feriae conceptivae) involving the lustration of the fields, seems to have been held in May, with May 29 commonly the date on which it fell.

Unless otherwise noted, the dating and observances on the following table are from H. H. Scullard, Festivals and Ceremonies of the Roman Republic (Cornell University Press, 1981), pp. 116–125.

Modern date	Roman date	status	Observances
May 1	Kalendae Maiae	F	• sacrifice of a pregnant sow to Maia by the Flamen Volcanalis • dies natalis of the Temple of Bona Dea on the Aventine Hill • sacrifice to the Lares Praestites • Ludi Florae, begun April 27 on the pre-Julian calendar, continue
2	ante diem VI Nonas Maias	F	• Ludi Florae continue
3	a.d. V Non. Mai.	C	• Ludi Florae conclude
4	IV Non. Mai.	C	
5	III Non. Mai.	C	
6	pridie Nonas Maias (abbrev. prid. Non. Mai.)	C	
7	Nonae Maiae	F	
8	VIII Id. Mai.	F	
9	VII Id. Mai.	N dies religiosus	• LEMURIA
10	VI Id. Mai.	C	• dies natalis of Claudius Gothicus (268–270)
11	V Id. Mai.	N dies religiosus	• LEMURIA resumes • sacrifice to Mania
12	IV Id. Mai.	C	
13	III Id. Mai.	N dies religiosus	• LEMURIA resumes
14	pridie Idūs Maias (abbrev. prid. Id. Mai.)	C	• dies natalis of the Temple of Mars Invictus in the Circus Flaminius • procession of the Argei
15	Idūs Maiae	NP	• Feriae Iovi, the monthly sacrifice on the Ides to Jupiter • merchants' festival and a sacrifice to Mercury and Maia
16	XVII Kal. Iun.	F	
17	XVI Kal. Iun.	C	
18	XV Kal. Iun.	C	
19	XIV Kal. Iun.	C	• Zenziarius, an otherwise unknown festival on the Calendar of Filocalus (after the mid-1st century AD)
20	XIII Kal. Iun.	C	
21	XII Kal. Iun.	NP	• AGONALIA for Vediovis
22	XI Kal. Iun.	N	
23	X Kal. Iun.	NP	• TUBILUSTRIUM • Feriae Volcano, rites for Vulcan • Macellus rosam sumat, marked on one calendar as the day when roses were brought to market
24	IX Kal. Iun.	F QRCF	• supplication to Vesta for the birthday of Germanicus (on the Feriale Cumanum, 4–14 AD and the Feriale Duranum, 224–235 AD)
25	VIII Kal. Iun.	C	• dies natalis of the Temple of Fortuna Populi Romani or Fortuna Primigenia
26	VII Kal. Iun.	C	
27	VI Kal. Iun.	C	
28	V Kal. Iun.	C	
29	IV Kal. Iun.	C	• a common date for the Ambarvalia • Ludi Fabaraci begin, games leading to the Bean Kalends of June 1 (after the mid-1st century AD) • dies natalis for Honos and Virtus • Zinza, an otherwise unknown festival on the Calendar of Filocalus
30	III Kal. Iun.	C	• Ludi Fabaraci continue
31	prid. Kal. Iun.	C	• Ludi Fabaraci continue • Rosalia signorum, when the Roman army adorned the military standards with roses

== See also ==
- Floréal
- Rosalia, a rose festival celebrated during the Imperial period at varying times mainly in May
