= Adonia =

Ancient Greek festival

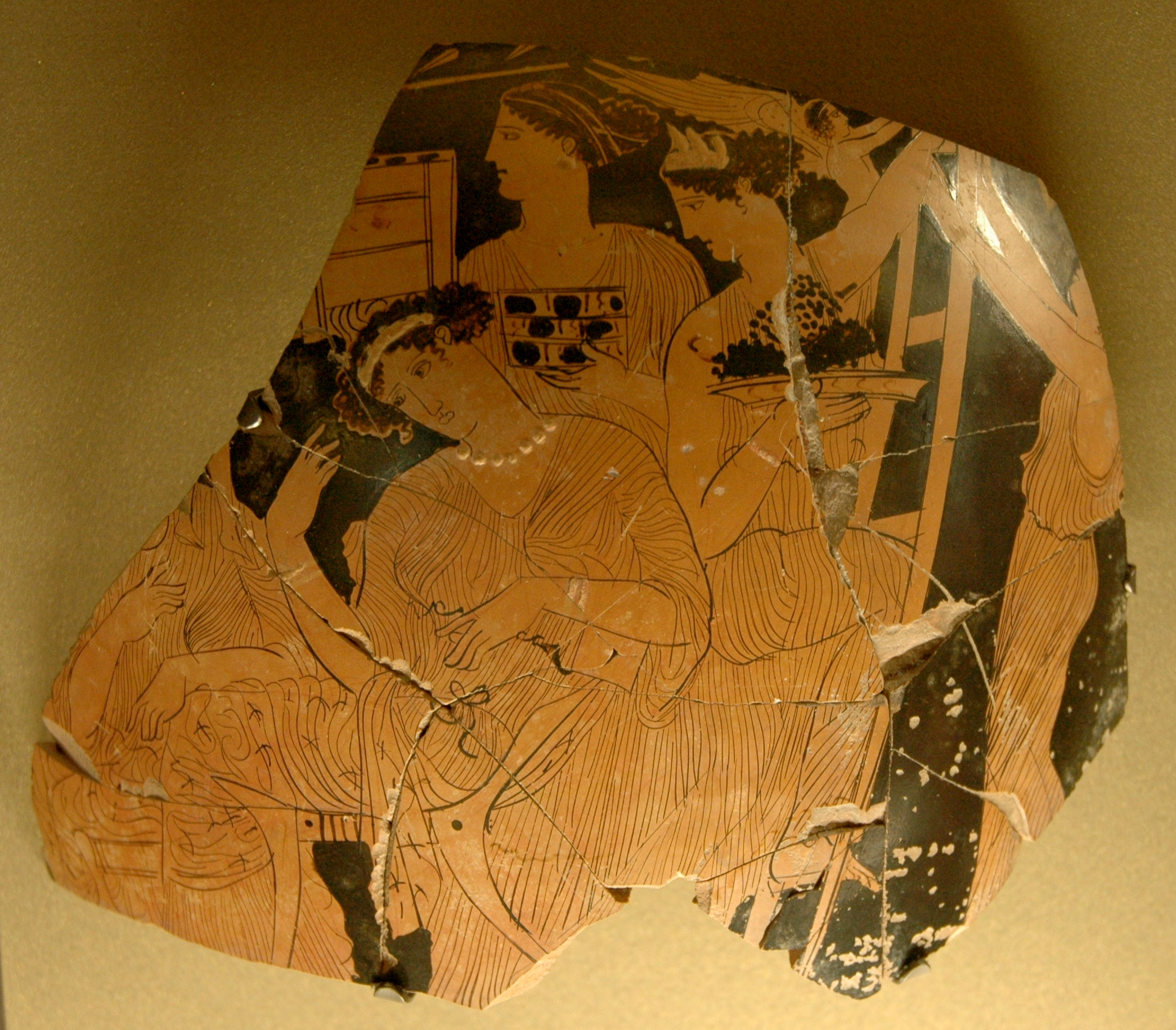
Celebrating the Adonia: fragment of an Attic red-figure wedding vase, ca. 430–420 BCE

The Adonia (Greek: Ἀδώνια) was a festival celebrated annually by women in ancient Greece to mourn the death of Adonis, the consort of Aphrodite. It is best attested in classical Athens, though other sources provide evidence for the ritual mourning of Adonis elsewhere in the Greek world, including Hellenistic Alexandria and Argos in the second century CE.

According to Ronda R. Simms in her article, "Mourning and Community at the Athenian Adonia", the celebration of the Adonia was the only evidence that was found about worship of Adonis in Athens, as of 1997. There were no temples, statues, or priests in worship to Adonis.

== Athenian festival ==
In Athens, the Adonia took place annually. It is unclear when the festival was first instituted in Athens; the earliest certain references to it are in plays by Aristophanes and Cratinus in the 420s BCE, and it may be depicted in a fragment of a red-figure vase from the mid-fifth century. It was organised and celebrated by women. It was one of a number of Athenian festivals which were celebrated solely by women and addressed sexual or reproductive subjects – others included the Thesmophoria, Haloa, and Skira. Unlike these other festivals, however, the Adonia was not state-organised, or part of the official state calendar of religious celebration. In fact, it was not found to be celebrated by any official cults, like the cult of Bendis, or foreign cults, whose participants were mostly non-natives, like Isis. Prostitutes, respectable women, non-citizens and citizens alike celebrated the Adonia.

Also unlike the Thesmophoria, the Adonia was never celebrated in a designated area. Over the course of the festival, Athenian women took to the rooftops of their houses. They danced, sang, and ritually mourned the death of Adonis. They planted "Gardens of Adonis" – lettuce and fennel seeds, planted in potsherds – which sprouted before withering and dying. After the rooftop celebrations, the women descended to the streets with these Gardens of Adonis, and small images of him; they then conducted a mock funeral procession, before ritually burying the images and the remains of the gardens at sea or in springs. The rites observed during the festival are not otherwise paralleled in ancient Greek religion; like Adonis himself they probably originated in the Near East.

=== Date ===
The date of the Adonia at Athens is uncertain, with ancient sources contradicting one another. Aristophanes, in his Lysistrata, has the festival take place in the early spring of 415 BCE, when the Sicilian Expedition was proposed; Plutarch puts the festival on the eve of the expedition's setting sail, in midsummer that year. Theophrastus' Enquiry into Plants (Περι φυτων ιστορια) and Plato's Phaedrus are both often taken as evidence for the Adonia having been celebrated in the summer. In Egypt and Syria in the Roman period, the Adonia coincided with the rising of the star Sirius in late July. As the Sicilian Expedition sailed in June 415, this contradicts both Aristophanes' and Plutarch's dating of the Adonia; the Athenian Adonia must have been celebrated at a different time.

Modern scholars disagree on which of these sources is correct. Many agree with Plutarch, and put the festival around midsummer, though Dillon argues that Aristophanes' placement of the festival near the beginning of spring is "without question" correct. Some scholars, such as James Fredal, suggest that there was in fact no fixed date for the Adonia to be celebrated.

=== Gardens of Adonis ===
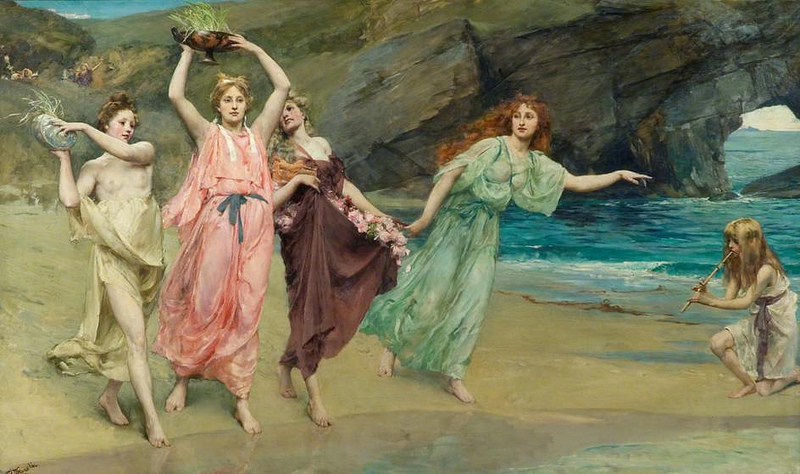
The Gardens of Adonis (1888) by John Reinhard Weguelin depicts the casting of the gardens of Adonis into the sea at the end of the Adonia.

The main feature of the festival at Athens were the "Gardens of Adonis", broken pieces of terracotta which had lettuce and fennel seeds sown in them. These seeds sprouted, but soon withered and died. Though most scholars say that these gardens withered due to being exposed to the heat of the summer, Dillon, who believes that the Adonia was held in the spring, says that the plants instead failed because they could not take root in the shallow soil held by the terracotta shards. In support of this, he cites Diogenianus, who says that in the Gardens of Adonis, seedlings "wither quickly because they have not taken root". In ancient Greece, the phrase "Gardens of Adonis" was used proverbially to refer to something "trivial and wasteful".

The symbolism of the Gardens of Adonis is also widely debated: according to James George Frazer, the Gardens of Adonis were supposed to be a sort of ritual performed in order to promote a good harvest, that the actual crops were to grow fast like the little gardens. To John J. Winkler the gardens were meant to represent how men had very little power when it came to regeneration in either plants or humans.

==== Purposes of the Gardens ====
There have also been debates on what the women did with the gardens. Most assume they put the gardens out on their rooftops to wither and die, in order to symbolize how Adonis "sprouted and died quickly". Simms believes that the gardens were made to be used as funerary biers for the little effigies of Adonis to be placed in. These little effigies were made so that the women could have something to focus their mourning towards, because this entire festival is supposed to mourn the loss of Adonis himself.

== Outside Athens ==
Outside of Athens, a celebration of Adonis is attested in Hellenistic Alexandria, in Theocritus' 15th Idyll. The Idyll 15 is said to be the longest surviving account of the Adonia we have to date. The festival described by Theocritus, unlike the one celebrated in Athens, was a cult with state patronage. It included an annual competition between women singing dirges for Adonis. Rites lamenting the death of Adonis are also attested in Argos in the second century CE: the Greek geographer Pausanias describes the women of Argos mourning Adonis' death at a shrine inside the temple of Zeus Soter. Also in the second century, On the Syrian Goddess, attributed to Lucian, describes an Adonia celebrated in Byblos. There is no mention of Gardens of Adonis at this festival, but ritual prostitution and mystery rites are involved in the celebrations. Laurialan Reitzammer argues that the festival described by Lucian is one that was brought back to Syria from Greece, rather than being of native Syrian origin.

The Phoenician text of the Pyrgi Tablets (western central Italy) seem to indicate that the commemoration of the death of Adonis was an important rite in Central Italy, that is if, as is generally assumed, the Phoenician phrase bym qbr ʼlm "on the day of the burial of the divinity" refers to this rite. This claim would be further strengthened if Schmidtz's recent claim can be accepted that the Phoenician phrase bmt n' bbt means "at the death of (the) Handsome (one) [=Adonis]." Together with evidence of the rite of Adonai in the Liber Linteus in the 7th column, there is a strong likelihood that the ritual was practiced in (at least) the southern part of Etruria from at least circe 500 BCE through the second century BCE (depending on one's dating of the Liber Linteus). The Liber Linteus also seems to support the date of this ritual in July. Adonis himself does not seem to be directly mentioned in any of the extant language of either text. In the Roman world, the festival was celebrated on 19 July.

== Works cited ==
- Burnett, Anne (2012). "Brothels, Boys, and the Athenian Adonia". Arethusa. 45 (2): 177–194. doi:10.1353/are.2012.0010. S2CID 162809295.
- Dillon, Matthew (2002). Girls and Women in Classical Greek Religion. London: Routledge. ISBN 0415202728.
- Dillon, Matthew (2003). "'Woe for Adonis' – but in Spring, not Summer". Hermes. 131 (1).
- Frazer, James George (2012) [1914]. The Golden Bough. Vol. 5 (3 ed.). Cambridge: Cambridge University Press. doi:10.1017/cbo9781139207522.013. ISBN 978-1-139-20752-2.
- Fredal, James (2002). "Herm Choppers, the Adonia, and Rhetorical Action in Ancient Greece". College English. 64 (5): 590–612. doi:10.2307/3250755. JSTOR 3250755.
- Goff, Barbara (2004). Citizen Bacchae: Women's Ritual Practice in Ancient Greece. Berkeley: University of California Press. ISBN 0520239989.
- Keuls, Eva C. (1991). "Review: John J. Winkler, The Constraints of Desire: The Anthropology of Sex and Gender in Ancient Greece". The American Historical Review. 96 (4). doi:10.1086/ahr/96.4.1174-a. ISSN 1937-5239.
- Reitzammer, Laurialan (2016). The Athenian Adonia in Context. Madison: University of Wisconsin Press. ISBN 9780299308209.
- Simms, Ronda R. (1997). "Mourning and Community at the Athenian Adonia". The Classical Journal. 93 (2): 121–141. ISSN 0009-8353. JSTOR 3298134.
- Smith, Tyler Jo (2017). "Review: Laurialan Reitzammer, The Athenian Adonia in Context: The Adonis Festival as Cultural Practice". Religious Studies Review. 43 (2): 163–164. doi:10.1111/rsr.12953. ISSN 0319-485X.
