= Roman festivals =

Scheduled celebration in ancient Rome

Festivals in ancient Rome were a very important part of Roman religious life during both the Republican and Imperial eras, and one of the primary features of the Roman calendar. Feriae ("holidays" in the sense of "holy days"; singular also feriae or dies ferialis) were either public (publicae) or private (privatae). State holidays were celebrated by the Roman people and received public funding. Games (ludi), such as the Ludi Apollinares, were not technically feriae, but the days on which they were celebrated were dies festi, holidays in the modern sense of days off work. Although feriae were paid for by the state, ludi were often funded by wealthy individuals. Feriae privatae were holidays celebrated in honor of private individuals or by families. This article deals only with public holidays, including rites celebrated by the state priests of Rome at temples, as well as celebrations by neighborhoods, families, and friends held simultaneously throughout Rome.

Feriae publicae were of three kinds:

- Stativae were annual holidays that held a fixed or stable date on the calendar.
- Conceptivae were annual holidays that were moveable feasts (like Easter on the Christian calendar, or Thanksgiving in North America); the date was announced by the magistrates or priests who were responsible for them.
- Imperativae were holidays held "on demand" (from the verb impero, imperare, "to order, command") when special celebrations or expiations were called for.

One of the most important sources for Roman holidays is Ovid's Fasti, an incomplete poem that describes and provides origins for festivals from January to June at the time of Augustus.

== Keeping the feriae ==
Varro defined feriae as "days instituted for the sake of the gods." Religious rites were performed on the feriae, and public business was suspended. Even slaves were supposed to be given some form of rest. Cicero says specifically that people who were free should not engage in lawsuits and quarrels, and slaves should get a break from their labours. Agricultural writers recognized that some jobs on a farm might still need to be performed, and specified what these were. Some agricultural tasks not otherwise permitted could be carried out if an expiation were made in advance (piaculum), usually the sacrifice of a puppy. Within the city of Rome, the flamens and the priest known as the Rex sacrorum were not allowed even to see work done.

On a practical level, those who "inadvertently" worked could pay a fine or offer up a piaculum, usually a pig. Work considered vital either to the gods or preserving human life was excusable, according to some experts on religious law. Although Romans were required not to work, they were not required to take any religious action unless they were priests or had family rites (sacra gentilicia) to maintain.

== List of festivals by month ==
Following is a month-by-month list of Roman festivals and games that had a fixed place on the calendar. For some, the date on which they were first established is recorded. A deity's festival often marks the anniversary (dies natalis, "birthday") of the founding of a temple, or a rededication after a major renovation. Festivals not named for deities are thought to be among the oldest on the calendar.

Some religious observances were monthly. The first day of the month was the Kalends (or Calends, from which the English word "calendar" derives). Each Kalends was sacred to Juno, and the Regina sacrorum ("Queen of the Rites," a public priestess) marked the day by presiding over a sacrifice to the goddess. Originally a pontiff and the Rex sacrorum reported the sighting of the new moon, and the pontiff announced whether the Nones occurred on the 5th or 7th of that month. On the Nones, announcements were made regarding events to take place that month; with the exception of the Poplifugia, no major festivals were held before the Nones, though other ceremonies, such as anniversaries of temple dedications, might be carried out. The Ides (usually the 13th, or in a few months the 15th) were sacred to Jupiter. On each Ides, a white lamb was led along the Via Sacra to the Capitolium for sacrifice to Jupiter.

The list also includes other notable public religious events such as sacrifices and processions that were observed annually but are neither feriae nor dies natales. Unless otherwise noted, the calendar is that of H.H. Scullard, Festivals and Ceremonies of the Roman Republic.

=== Ianuarius ===
- 1 (Calends): From 153 BC onward, consuls entered office on this date, accompanied by vota publica (public vows for the wellbeing of the republic and later of the emperor) and the taking of auspices. Festivals were also held for the imported cult of Aesculapius and for the obscure god Vediovis.
- 3-5: most common dates for Compitalia, a movable feast (feriae conceptivae)
- 5 (Nones): Dies natalis (founding day) of the shrine of Vica Pota on the Velian Hill
- 9: Agonalia in honor of Janus, after whom the month January is named; first of at least four festivals named Agonalia throughout the year
- 11 and 15: Carmentalia, with Juturna celebrated also on the 11th
- 13 (Ides)
- 24–26: most common dates for the Sementivae, a feriae conceptivae of sowing, perhaps also known as the Paganalia as celebrated by the pagi
- 27: Dies natalis of the Temple of Castor and Pollux, or perhaps marking its rededication (see also July 15); Ludi Castorum ("Games of the Castors") celebrated at Ostia during the Imperial period

=== Februarius ===
In the archaic Roman calendar, February was the last month of the year. The name derives from februa, "the means of purification, expiatory offerings." It marked a turn of season, with February 5 the official first day of spring bringing the renewal of agricultural activities after winter.

- 1 (Kalends): Dies natalis for the Temple of Juno Sospita, Mother and Queen; sacra at the Grove of Alernus, near the Tiber at the foot of the Palatine Hill
- 5: Dies natalis for the Temple of Concord on the Capitoline Hill
- 13 (Ides): minor festival of Faunus on the Tiber Island
- 13–22: Parentalia, a commemoration of ancestors and the dead among families
  - 13: Parentatio, with appeasement of the Manes beginning at the 6th hour and ceremonies performed by the chief Vestal; temples were closed, no fires burned on altars, marriages were forbidden, magistrates took off their insignia, until the 21st
- 15: Lupercalia
- 17: last day of the feriae conceptivae Fornacalia, the Oven Festival; Quirinalia, in honour of Quirinus
- 21: Feralia, the only public observation of the Parentalia, marked F (dies festus) in some calendars and FP (a designation of uncertain meaning) in others, with dark rites aimed at the gods below (di inferi)
- 22: Caristia (or Cara Cognatio, "Dear Kindred"), a potluck meal provided by all the family, and shared in a spirit of love and forgiveness
- 23: Terminalia, in honour of Terminus
- 24: Regifugium
- 27: Equirria, first of two horse-racing festivals to Mars

=== Martius ===
In the old Roman calendar (until perhaps as late as 153 BC), the mensis Martius ("Mars' Month") was the first month of the year. It is one of the few months to be named for a god, Mars, whose festivals dominate the month.

- 1 (Kalends): the original New Year's Day when the sacred fire of Rome was renewed; the dancing armed priesthood of the Salii celebrated the Feriae Marti (holiday for Mars), which was also the dies natalis ("birthday") of Mars; also the Matronalia, in honor of Juno Lucina, Mars' mother
- 7: a second festival for Vediovis
- 9: a dies religiosus when the Salii carried the sacred shields (ancilia) around the city again
- 14: the second Equirria, a Feriae Marti also called the Mamuralia or sacrum Mamurio
- 15 (Ides): Feriae Iovi, sacred to Jove, and also the feast of the year goddess Anna Perenna
- 16–17: the procession of the Argei
- 17: Liberalia, in honour of Liber; also an Agonalia for Mars
- 19: Quinquatrus, later expanded into a five-day holiday as Quinquatria, a Feriae Marti, but also a feast day for Minerva, possibly because her temple on the Aventine Hill was dedicated on this day
- 23: Tubilustrium, purification of the trumpets.
- 24: a day marked QRCF, when the Comitia Calata met to sanction wills
- 25: Hilaria, A two-weeks long festival commemorating Cybele's lamentation (fasting, castigation, taurobolium, festoonment, washing) of the death and rejoicing of at the resurrection of her mortal lover Attis.
- 31: anniversary of the Temple of Luna on the Aventine

=== Aprilis ===
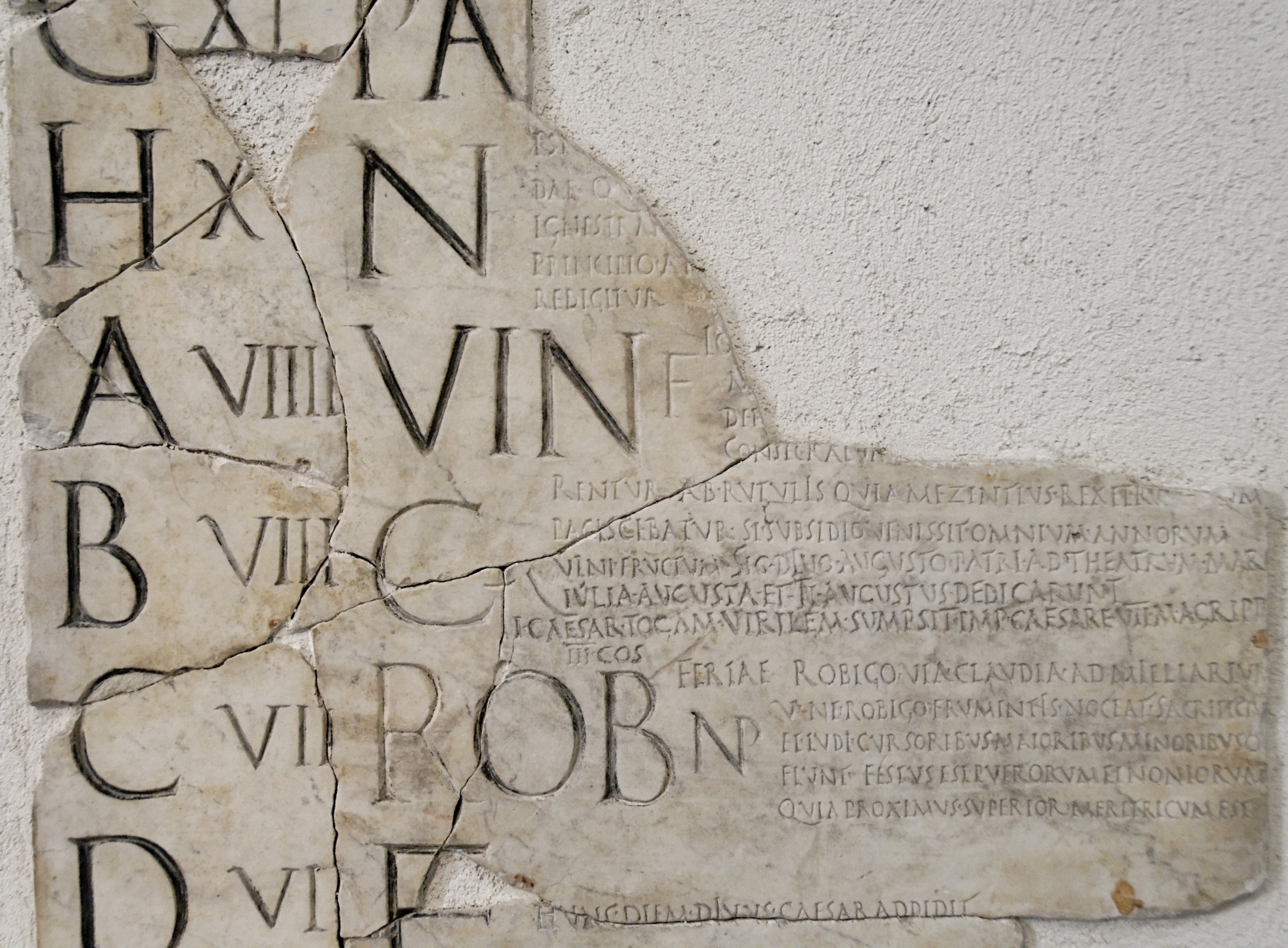
Piece of the fragmentary Fasti Praenestini for April, showing the Vinalia (VIN) and Robigalia (ROB)

A major feriae conceptivae in April was the Latin Festival.

- 1 (Kalends): Veneralia in honour of Venus
- 4–10: Ludi Megalenses or Megalesia, in honor of the Magna Mater or Cybele, whose temple was dedicated April 10, 191 BC
- 5: anniversary of the Temple of Fortuna Publica
- 12–19: Cerialia or Ludi Cereri, festival and games for Ceres, established by 202 BC
- 13 (Ides): anniversary of the Temple of Jupiter Victor
- 15: Fordicidia, offering of a pregnant cow to Tellus ("Earth"), Juppiter Victor (Jupiter The Victorious)
- 21: Parilia, rustic festival in honour of Pales, and the dies natalis of Rome
- 21: Dies Romana, a festival linked to the foundation of Rome. According to legend, Romulus is said to have founded the city of Rome on April 21, 753 BC. From this date, the Roman chronology derived its system, known by the Latin phrase Ab Urbe condita, meaning "from the founding of the City", which counted the years from this presumed foundation.
- 23: the first of two wine festivals (Vinalia), the Vinalia Priora for the previous year's wine, held originally for Jupiter and later Venus
- 25: Robigalia, an agricultural festival involving dog sacrifice
- 27 (28 in the Julian calendar) to May 1: Ludi Florales in honour of Flora, extended to May 3 under the Empire

=== Maius ===
The feriae conceptivae of this month was the Ambarvalia.

- 1 (Kalends): Games of Flora continue; sacrifice to Maia; anniversary of the Temple of Bona Dea on the Aventine; rites for the Lares Praestites, tutelaries of the city of Rome
- 3: in the Imperial period, a last celebration for Flora, or the anniversary of one of her temples
- 9, 11, 13: Lemuria, a festival of the dead with both public and household rites, possibly with a sacrifice to Mania on the 11th
- 14: anniversary of the Temple of Mars Invictus (Mars the Unconquered); a second procession of the Argei
- 15 (Ides): Mercuralia, in honor of Mercury; Feriae of Jove
- 21: one of four Agonalia, probably a third festival for Vediovis
- 23: a second Tubilustrium; Feriae for Volcanus (Vulcan)
- 24: QRCF, following Tubilustrium as in March
- 25: anniversary of the Temple of Fortuna Primigenia

=== Iunius ===
Scullard places the Taurian Games on June 25–26, but other scholars doubt these ludi had a fixed date or recurred on a regular basis.

- 1 (Kalends): anniversaries of the Temple of Juno Moneta; of the Temple of Mars on the clivus (slope, street) outside the Porta Capena; and possibly of the Temple of the Tempestates (storm goddesses); also a festival of the complex goddess Cardea or Carna
- 3: anniversary of the Temple of Bellona
- 4: anniversary of the restoration of the Temple of Hercules Custos
- 5: anniversary of the Temple of Dius Fidius
- 7: Ludi Piscatorii, "Fishermen's Games"
- 7–15: Vestalia, in honour of Vesta; June 9 was a dies religiosus to her
- 8: anniversary of the Temple of Mens
- 11: Matralia in honour of Mater Matuta; also the anniversary of the Temple of Fortuna in the Forum Boarium
- 13 (Ides): Feriae of Jove
- 13–15: Quinquatrus minusculae, the lesser Quinquatrus celebrated by tibicines, flute-players in their role as accompanists to religious ceremonies
- 19: a commemoration involving the Temple of Minerva on the Aventine, which had its anniversary March 19
- 20: anniversary of the Temple of Summanus
- 24: festival of Fors Fortuna, which "seems to have been a rowdy affair"
- 27: poorly attested observance in honour of the Lares; anniversary of the Temple of Jupiter Stator
- 29: anniversary of the Temple of Hercules Musarum, Hercules of the Muses

=== Iulius (Quinctilis) ===
Until renamed for Julius Caesar, this month was called Quinctilis or Quintilis, originally the fifth month (quint-) when the year began in March. From this point in the calendar forward, the months had numerical designations.

- 1 (Kalends): a scarcely attested anniversary of a temple to Juno Felicitas
- 5: Poplifugia
- 6–13: Ludi Apollinares, games in honour of Apollo, first held in 212 BC as a one-day event (July 13) and established as annual in 208 BC.
- 6: anniversary of the Temple of Fortuna Muliebris
- 7 (Nones): Nonae Caprotinae; Ancillarum Feriae (Festival of the Serving Women); sacrifice to Consus by unspecified public priests (sacerdotes publici); also a minor festival to the two Pales
- 8: Vitulatio
- 14–19: a series of markets or fairs (mercatus) following the Ludi Apollinares; not religious holidays
- 15 (Ides): Transvectio equitum, a procession of cavalry
- 17: anniversary of the Temple of Honos and Virtus; sacrifice to Victory
- 18: a dies ater ("black day," meaning a day of ill omen) marking the defeat of the Romans by the Gauls at the Battle of the Allia in 390 BC, leading to the sack of Rome by the Gauls
- 19, 21: Lucaria
- 20–30: Ludi Victoriae Caesaris, "Games of the Victorious Caesar", held annually from 45 BC
- 22: anniversary of the Temple of Concordia at the foot of the Capitol
- 23: Neptunalia held in honour of Neptune
- 25: Furrinalia, feriae publicae in honour of Furrina
- 30: anniversary of the Temple of the Fortune of This Day (Fortunae Huiusce Diei)

=== Augustus (Sextilis) ===
Until renamed for Augustus Caesar, this month was called Sextilis, originally the sixth month (sext-) when the year began in March.

- 1 (Kalends): anniversary of the Temple of Spes (Hope) in the Forum Holitorium, with commemorations also for the "two Victories" on the Palatine
- 3: Supplicia canum ("punishment of the dogs") an unusual dog sacrifice and procession at the temples of Iuventas ("Youth") and Summanus, connected to the Gallic siege
- 5: public sacrifice (sacrificium publicum) at the Temple of Salus on the Quirinal
- 9: public sacrifice to Sol Indiges
- 12: sacrifice of a heifer to Hercules Invictus, with a libation from the skyphos of Hercules
- 13 (Ides): festival of Diana on the Aventine (Nemoralia), with slaves given the day off to attend; other deities honored at their temples include Vortumnus, Fortuna Equestris, Hercules Victor (or Invictus at the Porta Trigemina), Castor and Pollux, the Camenae, and Flora
- 17: Portunalia in honour of Portunus; anniversary of the Temple of Janus
- 19: Vinalia Rustica, originally in honour of Jupiter, but later Venus
- 21: Consualia, with a sacrifice on the Aventine
- 23: Vulcanalia or Feriae Volcano in honour of Vulcan, along with sacrifices to Maia, the Nymphs in campo ("in the field", perhaps the Campus Martius), Ops Opifera, and a Hora
- 24: sacrifices to Luna on the Graecostasis; and the first of three days when the mysterious ritual pit called the mundus was opened
- 25: Opiconsivia or Feriae Opi in honour of Ops Consivae at the Regia
- 27: Volturnalia, when the Flamen Volturnalis made a sacrifice to Volturnus
- 28: Games at the Circus Maximus (circenses) for Sol and Luna

=== September ===
- 1 (Kalends): ceremonies for Jupiter Tonans ("the Thunderer") on the Capitolium, and Juno Regina on the Aventine
- 5: anniversary of one of the temples to Jupiter Stator
- 5–19, Ludi Romani or Ludi Magni, "the oldest and most famous" of the ludi
- 13 (Ides): anniversary of the Temple to Jupiter Optimus Maximus; an Epulum Iovis; an epulum to the Capitoline Triad
- 14: Equorum probatio ("Approval of the Horses"), a cavalry parade of the Imperial period
- 20–23: days set aside for markets and fairs (mercatus) immediately following the Ludi Romani
- 23: anniversary of the rededication of the Temple of Apollo in the Campus Martius; Latona was also honored
- 26: anniversary of the Temple of Venus Genetrix vowed by Julius Caesar

=== October ===
- 1 (Kalends): ceremonies for Fides and the Tigillum Sororium
- 3–12: Ludi Augustales, established 14 AD after the death of Augustus, based on the Augustalia
- 4: Ieiunium Cereris, a day of fasting in honour of Ceres, instituted in 191 BC as a quinquennial observance, made annual by Augustus
- 5: second of the three days when the mundus was opened
- 6: dies ater ("black day") to mark the anniversary of the battle of Arausio (105 BC)
- 7 (Nones): rites for Jupiter Fulgur (Jupiter of daytime lightning) and Juno Curitis
- 9: rites at shrines for the Genius Publicus, Fausta Felicitas, and Venus Victrix on the Capitolium
- 10: ceremonies to mark a rededication of the Temple of Juno Moneta
- 11: Meditrinalia
- 12: Augustalia, celebrated from 14 AD in honour of the divinized Augustus, established in 19 BC with a new altar and sacrifice to Fortuna Redux
- 13: Fontinalia in honour of Fons
- 14: ceremonies to mark a restoration of the Temple of the Penates Dei on the Velian Hill
- 15 (Ides): October Horse sacrifice to Mars in the Campus Martius; also Feriae of Jupiter
- 19: Armilustrium, a dies religiosus in honour of Mars
- 26 to November 1: Ludi Victoriae Sullanae, "Victory Games of Sulla", established as an annual event in 81 BC

=== November ===
- 1 (Kalends): Ludi circenses to close the Sullan Victory Games
- 4–17: Ludi Plebeii (Plebeian Games)
- 8: third of the three days when the mundus ritual pit was opened
- 13 (Ides): Epulum Jovis; also ceremonies for Feronia and Fortuna Primigeniae
- 14: a second Equorum probatio (cavalry parade), as on July 15
- 18–20: markets and fairs (mercatus)
- 24-30: Brumalia (continues into December)

=== December ===
- 1-17: Brumalia (continued from November)
- 3: Bona Dea rites for women only
- 5 (Nones): a country festival for Faunus held by the pagi
- 8: festival for Tiberinus Pater and Gaia
- 11: Agonalia for Indiges; also the (probably unrelated) Septimontium
- 12: ceremonies at the Temple of Consus on the Aventine
- 13 (Ides): dies natalis of the Temple of Tellus, and associated lectisternium for Ceres
- 15: Consualia or Feriae for Consus, the second of the year
- 17–23: Saturnalia in honour of Saturn, with the public ritual on the 17th
- 18 Eponalia in honor of Epona
- 19: Opalia in honor of Ops
- 21: Divalia in honor of Angerona; Hercules and Ceres also received a sacrifice
- 22: anniversary of the Temple of the Lares Permarini in the Porticus Minucia
- 23: Larentalia; commemorations for the temples of Diana and Juno Regina in the Circus Flaminius, and for the Tempestates; Sigillaria, the last day of the Saturnalia, devoted to gift-giving
- 25: Dies Natalis Solis Invicti ("Birthday of the Unconquered Sun")

== Feriae conceptivae ==
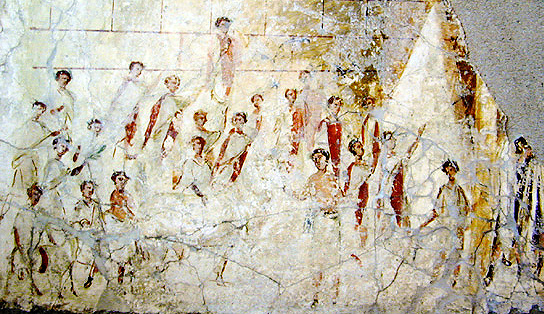
A rare depiction of Roman men wearing the toga praetexta and participating in what is probably the Compitalia

The following "moveable feasts" are listed roughly in chronological order.

- Compitalia, held sometime between December 17 (the Saturnalia) and January 5; in the later Empire, they were regularly held January 3–5, but Macrobius (5th century AD) still categorized them as conceptivae.
- Sementivae, a festival of sowing honoring Tellus and Ceres, placed on January 24–26 by Ovid, who regards these feriae as the same as Paganalia; Varro may indicate that the two were separate festivals.
- Fornacalia, a mid-February baking festival celebrated by the curiae, the 30 archaic divisions of the Roman people; the date was announced by the curio maximus and set for each curia individually, with a general Fornacalia on February 17 for those who had missed their own or who were uncertain to which curia they belonged.
- Amburbium, a ceremony to purify the city (urbs) as a whole, perhaps held sometime in February.
- Feriae Latinae (Latin Festival), a major and very old conceptivae in April.
- Ambarvalia, purification of the fields in May.

The Rosalia or "Festival of Roses" also had no fixed date, but was technically not one of the feriae conceptivae with a date announced by public priests based on archaic practice.

== Feriae imperativae ==
Festivals were also held in ancient Rome in response to particular events, or for a particular purpose such as to propitiate or show gratitude toward the gods. For example, Livy reports that following the Roman destruction of Alba Longa in the 7th century BC, and the removal of the Alban populace to Rome, it was reported to have rained stones on the Mons Albanus. A Roman deputation was sent to investigate the report, and a further shower of stones was witnessed. The Romans took this to be a sign of the displeasure of the Alban gods, the worship of whom had been abandoned with the evacuation of Alba Longa. Livy goes on to say that the Romans instituted a public festival of nine days, at the instigation either of a 'heavenly voice' heard on the Mons Albanus, or of the haruspices. Livy also says that it became the longstanding practice in Rome that whenever a shower of stones was reported, a festival of nine days would be ordered in response.

Another irregular festival of note is the Secular Games. Over the course of several days there were sacrifices, entertainers, and games hosted by the state, attempting to be the greatest display anyone living had ever seen. These games were intended to be held every 100 years with the purpose of it occurring only once in any individuals lifetime. At one point two cycles of the Secular Games were being held simultaneously, leading there to be people who would in fact witness it twice in their life.

== Mercatus ==
The noun mercatus (plural mercatūs) means "commerce" or "the market" generally, but it also refers to fairs or markets held immediately after certain ludi. Cicero said that Numa Pompilius, the semi-legendary second king of Rome, established mercatus in conjunction with religious festivals to facilitate trade, since people had already gathered in great numbers. In early times, these mercatus may have played a role in wholesale trade, but as commerce in Rome became more sophisticated, by the late Republic they seem to have become retail fairs specialized for the holiday market. The Sigillaria attached to the Saturnalia may have been a mercatus in this sense. Surviving fasti record Mercatus Apollinares, July 14–19; Mercatus Romani, September 20–23; and Mercatus Plebeii, November 18–20. Others may have existed. The English word "fair" derives from Latin feria.

== "Roman holidays" as trope ==
By the outset of the nineteenth century and particularly in response to the carnage of the latter years of the French revolution, the term "Roman holiday" had taken on sinister aspects, implying an event that occasions enjoyment or profit at the expense, or derived from the suffering, of others, as in this passage about a dying strong man from Lord Byron's Childe Harold's Pilgrimage:

There were his young barbarians all at play,
There was their Dacian mother—he their sire,
Butchered to make a Roman holiday."

More benignly, the phrase was used as the title of a romantic movie set in Rome, Roman Holiday.

== See also ==
- Fasti
- Spectacles in ancient Rome
