= October (Roman month) =

Eighth month in the Roman calendar

October (from Latin octo, "eight") or mensis October was the eighth of ten months on the oldest Roman calendar. It had 31 days. October followed September (from septem, "seven") and preceded November (novem, "nine"). After the calendar reform circa 153 BC that established January as the first month, October became the tenth month, though retaining its numerical name, as did the other months from September to December.

Some of the observances in October marked the close of the season for military campaigning and farming, which commenced in March (Martius, "Mars' month"). October was under the guardianship (tutela) of Mars.

== Dates ==
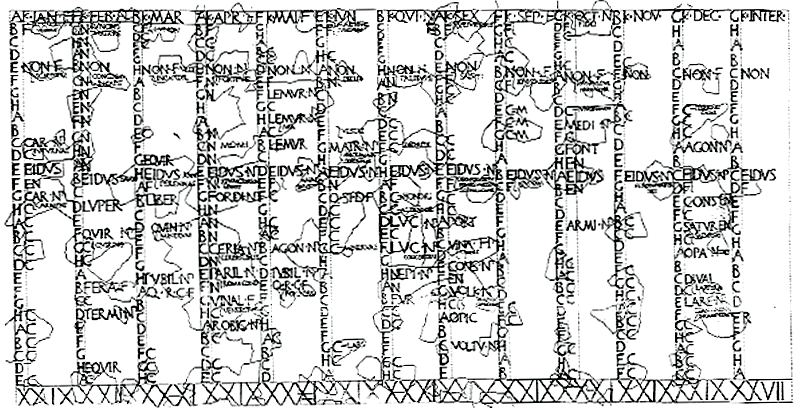
Drawing of the fragmentary Fasti Antiates, a pre-Julian calendar showing October (abbreviated OCT) at the top of the tenth column

The Romans did not number days of a month sequentially from the 1st through the last day. Instead, they counted back from the three fixed points of the month: the Nones (5th or 7th), the Ides (13th or 15th), and the Kalends (1st) of the following month. The Nones of October was the 7th, and the Ides was the 15th. The last day of October was the pridie Kalendas Novembris, "day before the Kalends of November". Roman counting was inclusive; October 9 was ante diem VII Idūs Octobris, "the 7th day before the Ides of October," usually abbreviated a.d. VII Id. Oct. (or with the a.d. omitted altogether); October 23 was X Kal. Nov., "the 10th day before the Kalends of November."

On the calendar of the Roman Republic and early Principate, each day was marked with a letter to denote its religiously lawful status. In March, these were:

- F for dies fasti, days when it was legal to initiate action in the courts of civil law;
- C, for dies comitalis, a day on which the Roman people could hold assemblies (comitia), elections, and certain kinds of judicial proceedings;
- N for dies nefasti, when these political activities and the administration of justice were prohibited;
- NP, the meaning of which remains elusive, but which marked feriae, public holidays;
- EN for endotercissus, an archaic form of intercissus, "cut in half," meaning days that were nefasti in the morning, when sacrifices were being prepared, and in the evening, while sacrifices were being offered, but were fasti in the middle of the day.

By the late 2nd century AD, extant calendars no longer show days marked with these letters, probably in part as a result of calendar reforms undertaken by Marcus Aurelius. Days were also marked with nundinal letters in cycles of A B C D E F G H, to mark the "market week" (these are omitted in the table below).

A dies natalis was an anniversary such as a temple founding or rededication, sometimes thought of as the "birthday" of a deity. During the Imperial period, some of the traditional festivals localized at Rome became less important, and the birthdays and anniversaries of the emperor and his family gained prominence as Roman holidays. On the calendar of military religious observances known as the Feriale Duranum, sacrifices pertaining to Imperial cult outnumber the older festivals, but among the military the importance of Mars was maintained and perhaps magnified. The dies imperii was the anniversary of an emperor's accession. After the mid-1st century AD, a number of dates are added to calendars for spectacles and games (ludi) held in honor of various deities in the venue called a "circus" (ludi circenses). Festivals marked in large letters on extant fasti, represented by festival names in all capital letters on the table, are thought to have been the most ancient holidays, becoming part of the calendar before 509 BC.

Unless otherwise noted, the dating and observances on the following table are from H.H. Scullard, Festivals and Ceremonies of the Roman Republic (Cornell University Press, 1981), pp. 189–196.

Modern date	Roman date	status	Observances
October 1	Kalendae Octobres	N	• sacrifices for the dies natalis of the Temple of Fides on the Capitoline •Tigillum Sororium • dies natalis of Alexander Severus (reigned 222–235 AD), with circus games
2	ante diem VI Nonas Octobris	F	
3	a.d. V Non. Oct. (Note: Abbreviated form of ante diem V Nonas Octobris.)	C	
4	IV Non. Oct. (Note: Abbreviated form of ante diem IV Nonas Octobris.)	C	• Ieiunium Cereris, a fast in honor of Ceres
5	III Non. Oct.	C dies religiosus	• mundus patet, the second of three days in the year when a mysterious pit or underground chamber was opened
6	pridie Nonas Octobris (abbrev. prid. Non. Oct.)	C	
7	Nonae Octobres	F	• dies natalis for Jupiter Fulgur ("Lightning Jupiter") and for Juno Curitis • supplication to Vesta for the birthday of Drusus Caesar (on the Feriale Cumanum, 4–14 AD)
8	VIII Id. Oct. (Note: Abbreviated form of ante diem VII Idūs Octobris, with the ante diem omitted altogether from this point.)	F	
9	VII Id. Oct.	C	• dies natales of temples for the Genius Publicus ("Public Genius"), Fausta Felicitas, and Venus Victrix on the Capitoline
10	VI Id. Oct.	C	• dies natalis for a restoration of the Temple of Juno Moneta
11	V Id. Oct.	NP	• MEDITRINALIA • Feriae Iovi
12	IV Id. Oct.	C	
13	III Id. Oct.	NP	• FONTINALIA in honor of Fons, outside the Porta Fontinalis
14	pridie Idūs Octobris (abbrev. prid. Id. Oct.)	EN	• dies natalis for a temple of the Penates on the Velian
15	Idūs Octobres	NP	• October Horse • regular Feriae Iovi for the Ides • Ludi Capitolini
16	XVII Kal. Nov. (Note: Abbreviated form of ante diem XVII Kalendas Novembris/-es with the ante diem omitted altogether, as in the rest of the month following.)	F	
17	XVI Kal. Nov.	C	
18	XV Kal. Nov.	C	• supplication to Spes ("Hope") and Iuventas ("Youth") to commemorate the day Augustus assumed the toga virilis (on the Feriale Cumanum, 4–14 AD)
19	XIV Kal. Nov.	NP dies religiosus	• ARMILUSTRIUM • Ludi Solis ("Games of the Sun") begin, introduced sometimes after the mid-1st century AD
20	XIII Kal. Nov.	C	• Ludi Solis continue
21	XII Kal. Nov.	C	• Ludi Solis continue
22	XI Kal. Nov.	C	• Ludi Solis conclude
23	X Kal. Nov.	C	
24	IX Kal. Nov.	C	
25	VIII Kal. Nov.	C	
26	VII Kal. Nov.	C	• Ludi Victoriae Sullanae ("Games for Sulla's Victory") begin, and continue through November 1, from 81 BC until some point during the Imperial period
27	VI Kal. Nov.	C	• Ludi Victoriae Sullanae continue
28	V Kal. Nov.	C	• Ludi Victoriae Sullanae continue • Isia, a festival of Isis introduced probably in the 30s or 40s AD, beginning with the Castu Isidis, a day of abstention and loss
29	IV Kal. Nov.	C	• Ludi Victoriae Sullanae continue • Isia continues
30	III Kal. Nov.	C	• Ludi Victoriae Sullanae continue • Isia continues
31	prid. Kal. Nov.	C	• Ludi Victoriae Sullanae continue (through November 1) • Isia continues (through November 3)
