= Ianuarius =

First month of the revised ancient Roman calendar

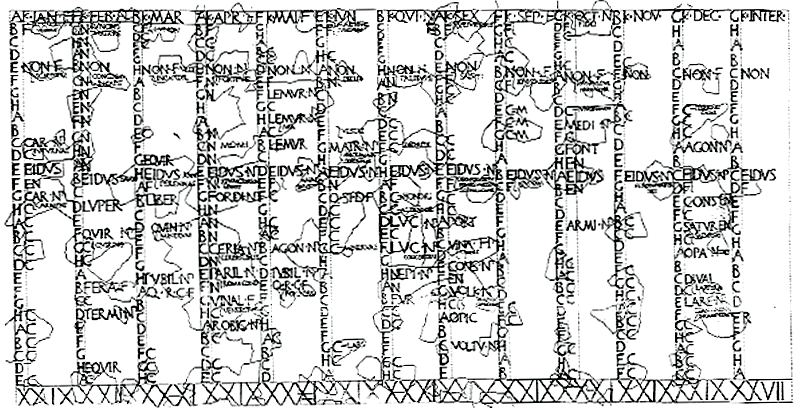
Drawing of the fragmentary Fasti Antiates, a pre-Julian calendar showing Ianuarius (abbreviated IAN) at the top of the first column

Ianuarius, Januarius ("January"), or in full mensis Ianuarius, abbreviated Ian., was the first month of the ancient Roman calendar, from which the Julian and Gregorian month of January derived. It was followed by Februarius ("February"). In the calendars of the Roman Republic, Ianuarius had 29 days. Two days were added when the calendar was reformed under Julius Caesar in 45 BCE.

In the oldest Roman calendar, which the Romans believed to have been instituted by their legendary founder Romulus, the first month was Martius ("month of Mars", March), and the calendar year had only ten months. Ianuarius and Februarius were supposed to have been added by Numa Pompilius, the second king of Rome, originally at the end of the year. It is unclear when the Romans reset the course of the year so that January and February came first. Ianuarius is conventionally thought to have taken its name from Janus, the dual-faced god of beginnings, openings, passages, gates and doorways, but according to ancient Roman farmers' almanacs Juno was the tutelary deity of the month.

== In the agricultural year ==
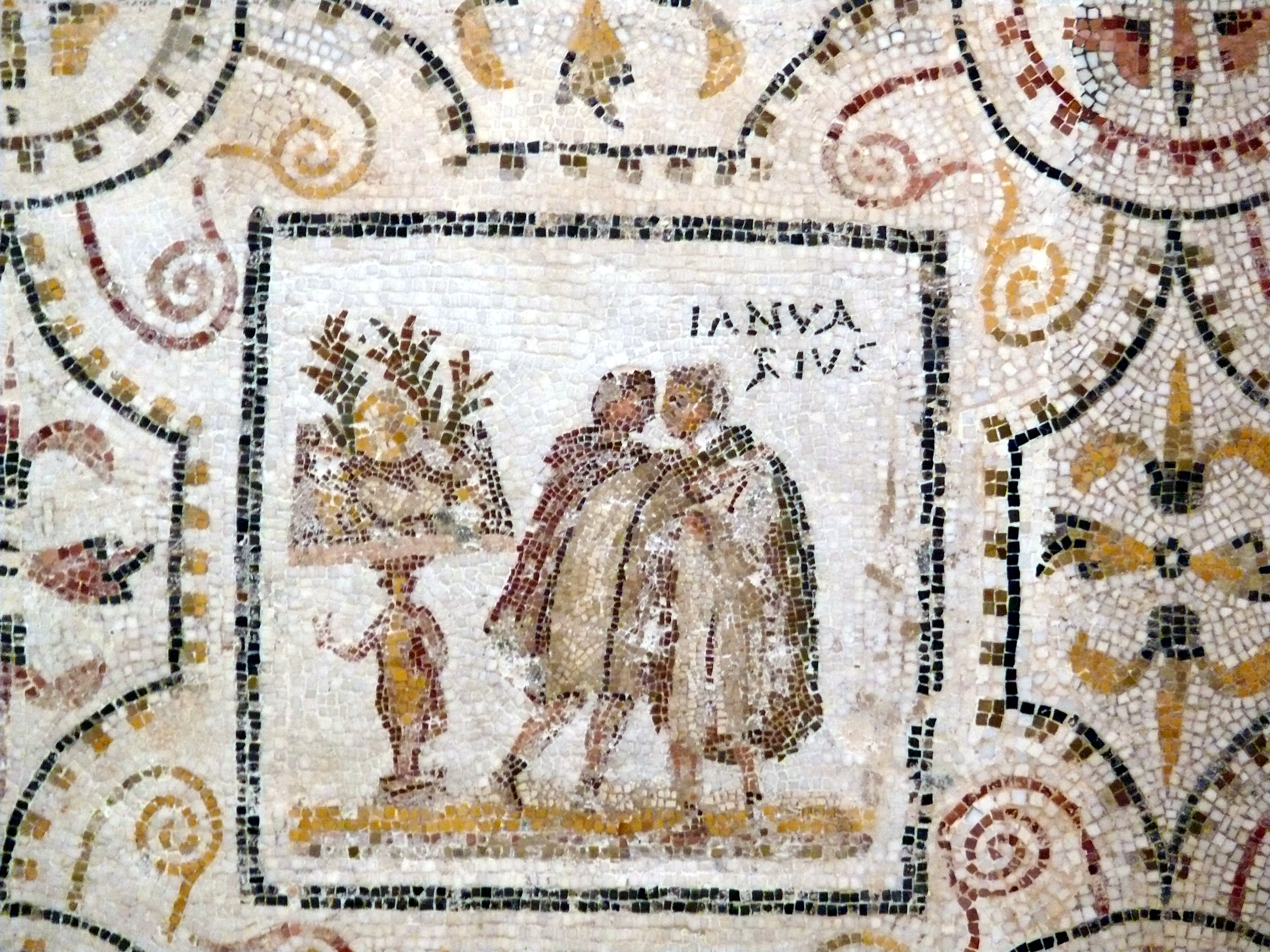
Ianuarius panel of the months mosaic from El Djem, Tunisia (Roman Africa), in which March is represented as the first month (3rd century AD)

Many Roman festivals and religious observances reflect the Romans' agrarian way of life in their early history. Agricultural calendars (menologia rustica) show that for farmers, January continued the relatively slack time they experienced in December. For January, these almanacs advised farmers to expect 9¾ hours of daylight and 14¼ hours of darkness, and to sharpen stakes, cut willows and reeds, and offer sacrifice to the Dei Penates, tutelary deities. The agricultural writer Columella says that farmers who were religiosiores, more scrupulous than others, would refrain from working the land until January 13, except that on January 1 they should make an auspicious gesture (auspiciandi causa) of beginning work on everything they wanted to get done that year.

Varro, in his agricultural treatise, divides the agricultural year into eight phases. The phase from the winter solstice to February 7, when Favonius the west wind was thought to start blowing favorably, was not for hard work, but odd jobs and tidying.

== Civic life ==
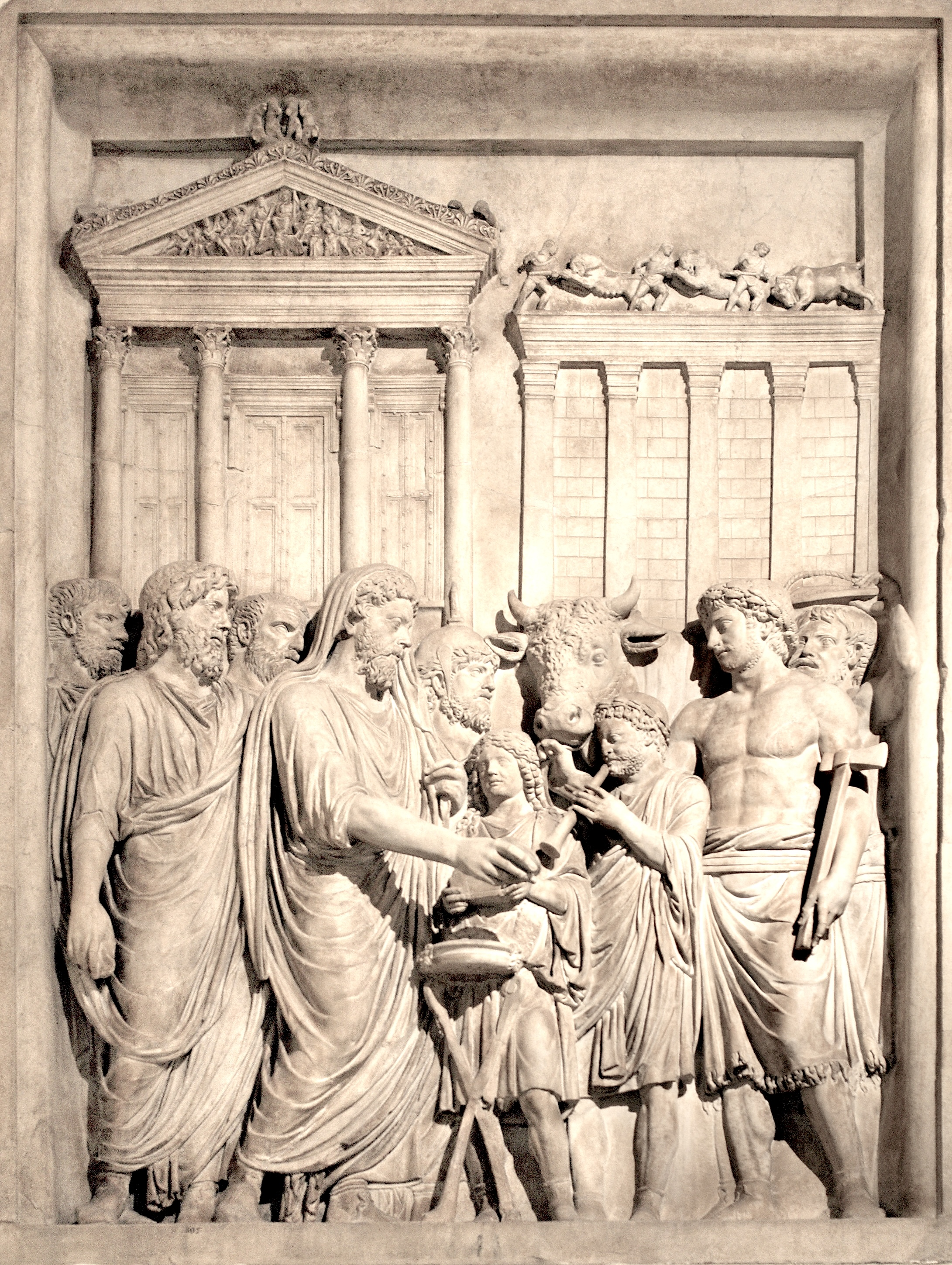
The emperor Marcus Aurelius, his head ritually covered, offers the sacrifice of a bull at the Temple of Jupiter Optimus Maximus

In the Roman Republic, consuls entered office at the beginning of the year; from 153 BC onward, on January 1. Auspices were taken, and if favorable the two consuls went home and put on their toga praetexta, with the purple stripe signifying their status. A procession of senators and equestrians accompanied them from their home to the Temple of Jupiter Optimus Maximus on the Capitoline Hill. The people dressed festively and watched the parade. At the temple, each consul sacrificed a white bull to Jupiter in fulfillment of the vow made by the previous year's consuls to ask for the wellbeing (salus) of the commonwealth (vota pro salute rei publicae). New vows were then made.

The senior of the two consuls next convened the senate. Among other business, he announced the date of the Feriae Latinae ("Latin Festival"), a moveable feast to be held in April and one of the oldest festivals of the religious calendar. Within five days, in the presence of the quaestors at the Temple of Saturn, the consuls took an oath to obey the laws.

In the Imperial period, vows for the wellbeing of the emperor were made instead.

== Dates ==
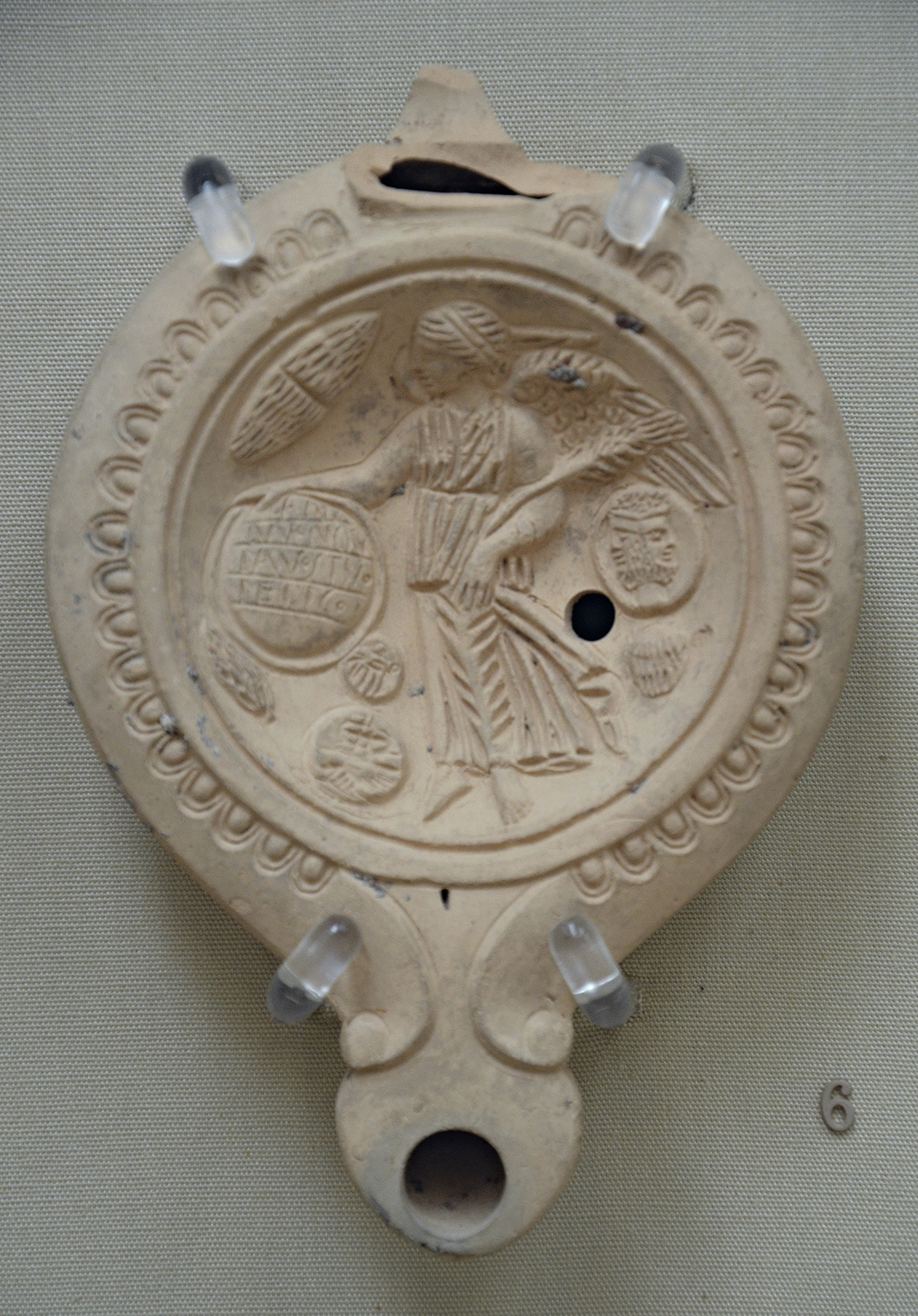
An oil lamp (AD 50–100) with the Latin greeting Annum Novum Faustum Felicem ("A Happy and Prosperous New Year") depicting a winged Victory with New Year's symbols including a Janus coin (center right)

The Romans did not number days of a month sequentially from the 1st through the last day. Instead, they counted back from the three fixed points of the month: the Nones (5th or 7th, depending on the length of the month), the Ides (13th or 15th), and the Kalends (1st) of the following month. The Nones of January fell on the 5th, and the Ides on the 13th. The last day of January was the pridie Kalendas Februarias, (Note: The month name is construed as an adjective modifying Kalendae, Nonae or Idūs (all plural nouns of feminine gender).) "day before the Kalends of February". Roman counting was inclusive; January 9 was ante diem V Idūs Ianuarias, "the 5th day before the Ides (13th) of January," usually abbreviated a.d. V Id. Ian. (or with the a.d. omitted altogether); January 23 was X Kal. Feb., "the 10th day before the Kalends of February."

On the calendar of the Roman Republic and early Principate, each day was marked with a letter to denote its religiously lawful status. In January, these were:

- F for dies fasti, days when it was legal to initiate action in the courts of civil law;
- C, for dies comitalis, a day on which the Roman people could hold assemblies (comitia), elections, and certain kinds of judicial proceedings;
- N for dies nefasti, when these political activities and the administration of justice were prohibited;
- NP, the meaning of which remains elusive, but which marked feriae, public holidays;
- EN for endotercissus, an archaic form of intercissus, "cut in half," meaning days that were nefasti in the morning, when sacrifices were being prepared, and in the evening, while sacrifices were being offered, but were fasti in the middle of the day.

Days were also marked with nundinal letters in cycles of A B C D E F G H, to mark the "market week" (these are omitted in the table below).

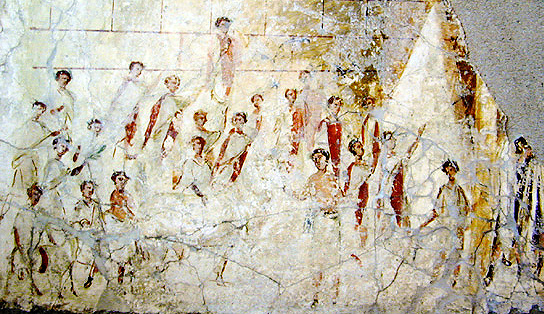
Wall painting from Pompeii depicting men wearing the toga praetexta and thought to be celebrating the Compitalia

January had two feriae conceptivae, moveable feasts that might occur on varying days to be announced by the Roman pontiffs. These were Compitalia ("Crossroads Festival") and Sementivae ("Festival of Sowing"), which the table below shows on the dates when they seem to have been observed most often.

A dies natalis was an anniversary such as a temple founding or rededication, sometimes thought of as the "birthday" of a deity. During the Imperial period, some of the traditional festivals localized at Rome became less important, and the birthdays and anniversaries of the emperor and his family gained prominence as Roman holidays. On the calendar of military religious observances known as the Feriale Duranum, sacrifices pertaining to Imperial cult outnumber the older festivals. After the mid-1st century AD, a number of dates are added to calendars for spectacles and games held in honor of various deities in the venue called a "circus". By the late 2nd century AD, extant calendars no longer show days marked with letters (F, N, C and so on) to show their religious status, probably in part as a result of calendar reforms undertaken by Marcus Aurelius. Festivals marked in large letters on extant fasti, represented by festival names in all capital letters on the table, are thought to have been the most ancient holidays, becoming part of the calendar before 509 BC.

Ianuarius was expanded from 29 to 31 days on the Julian calendar. On the table below, dates after the Ides are those of the Julian calendar, with the pre-Julian date for festivals noted parenthetically. Unless otherwise noted, the dating and observances are taken from H.H. Scullard, Festivals and ceremonies of the Roman Republic.

Modern date	Roman date	status	Observances
Jan. 1	Kalendae Ianuariae	F	• Consuls take office (from 153 BC) • sacrifices to Aesculapius and Vediovis at their Tiber Island sanctuaries
2	ante diem IV Nonas Ianuarias	F	
3	a.d. III Non. Ian. (Note: Abbreviated form of ante diem III Nonas Ianuarias.)	C	• day on which the three-day Compitalia most often began
4	pridie Nonas Ianuarias (abbrev. prid. Non. Ian.)	C	• continuation of Compitalia on its most frequently observed date
5	Nonae Ianuariae	F	• dies natalis of the shrine of Vica Pota on the Velia • day on which Compitalia most often ended
6	ante diem VIII Idūs Ianuarias	F	
7	a.d. VII Id. Ian. (Note: Abbreviated form of ante diem VII Idūs Ianuarias.)	C	• supplication for Jupiter Sempiternus to commemorate the assumption of the fasces by Augustus (on the Feriale Cumanum, 4–14 AD) • Circenses for Father Janus (after late-1st century AD)
8	VI Id. Ian. (Note: Abbreviated form of ante diem VII Idūs Ianuarias, with the ante diem omitted altogether from this point.)	C	
9	V Id. Ian.	NP	• AGONALIA for Janus at the Regia
10	IV Id. Ian.	EN	
11	III Id. Ian.	NP	• CARMENTALIA • dies natalis of the cult of Juturna in the Campus Martius
12	pridie Idūs (abbrev. prid. Id.)	C	
13	Idūs Ianuariae	NP	Ludi circenses for Jupiter Stator (after late-1st century AD)
14	ante diem XIX Kalendas Februarias (Note: In counting back from the Kalends of February, the dates following after the Ides include the two days added to January in the reformed Julian calendar. In the earlier calendars, January 29 would have been prid. Kal. Feb.)	EN	• some fasti of the early Principate mark January 14 as a dies vitiosus, a religiously defective day, because it was the birthday of Mark Antony (Note: Claudius, the grandson of Antony, rehabilitated the day.)
15	a.d. XVIII Kal. Feb. (Note: Abbreviated form of ante diem XVIII Kalendas Februarias.)	NP	• CARMENTALIA (XVI Kal. Feb. on the pre-Julian calendar)
16	XVII Kal. Feb. (Note: Abbreviated form of ante diem XVII Kalendas Februarias with the ante diem omitted altogether, as in the rest of the month following.)	C	• supplication for Augustus on the day he received the title Augustus (Feriale Cumanum)
17	XVI Kal. Feb.	C	
18	XV Kal. Feb.	C	
19	XIV Kal. Feb.	C	
20	XIII Kal. Feb.	C	
21	XII Kal. Feb.	C	
22	XI Kal. Feb.	C	
23	X Kal. Feb.	C	
24	IX Kal. Feb.	C	• day on which the three-day Sementivae most often began • sacrifices for the dies natalis of the emperor Hadrian (reigned 117–138 AD) (Note: On the Feriale Duranum, a calendar of official religious observance for a military unit stationed at Dura-Europos.)
25	VIII Kal. Feb.	C	• continuation of Sementivae on its most frequently observed date
26	VII Kal. Feb.	C	• day on which Sementivae most often ended
27	VI Kal. Feb.	C	• dies natalis of the Temple of Castor and Pollux (IV Kal. Feb. on the pre-Julian calendar)
28	V Kal. Feb.	C	
29	IV Kal. Feb.	C	
30	III Kal. Feb.		(day added to the month on the Julian calendar)
31	prid. Kal. Feb.		(day added to the month on the Julian calendar)
