= Augustalia =

Festival celebrated in honor of Augustus

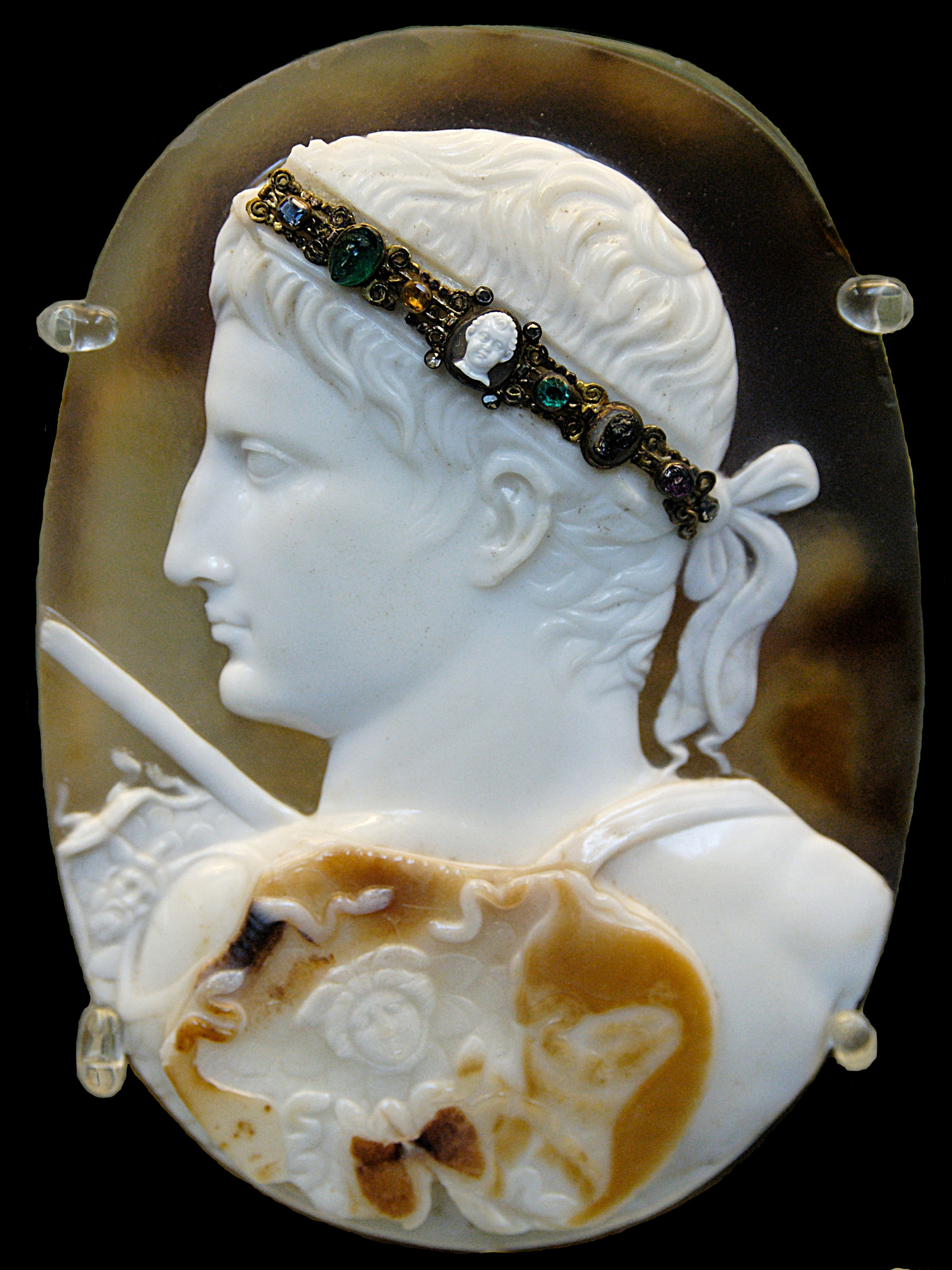
The Blacas Cameo (early 1st century AD), depicting Augustus wearing an aegis

The Augustalia, also known as the Ludi Augustales ("Augustan Games"), was a festival celebrated between the 2nd and the 12th of October in honour of Augustus, the first Roman emperor. It was established in conjunction with an altar to Fortuna Redux to mark the return of Augustus from Asia Minor to Rome in 19 BC. The pontiffs and Vestals conducted sacrifices, and the date became a holiday (feria) on the official religious calendar of Rome.

The altar to Fortuna Redux was inaugurated on October 12, 19 BC, but dedicated on December 15. Until Augustus died in 14 AD, Fortuna Redux was the recipient of the day's religious honors, and the name Augustalia does not appear in sources before that time. During his lifetime, Augustus was honored with ludi Augustales, games (ludi) presented on the initiative of individual magistrates. Strictly speaking, the Augustalia was the anniversary sacrifice, though Augustalia can also refer to commemorations of Augustus on his birthday, September 23.

Augustus lists the establishment of the festival in his posthumously published first-person account of his achievements (Res Gestae), emphasizing that it takes its name from his cognomen. Roman festivals were often named for the deities they honored (Neptunalia for Neptune, Cerealia for Ceres), and the unstated implication was that Augustus was to be accorded divine status. The establishment of the Augustalia thus marks a major development in what was to become Imperial cult.

The Augustalia, abbreviated as AVG, appears on calendars in large, capital letters like some of the oldest festivals for deities of Rome's archaic religion. It occurs between the Meditrinalia (October 11) and the Fontinalia (October 13), both of great antiquity.

== See also ==
- Imperial cult (ancient Rome)
- Sodales Augustales
