= November (Roman month) =

Month of the Roman calendar

November (from Latin novem, "nine") or mensis November was originally the ninth of ten months on the Roman calendar, following October (octo, "eight") and preceding December (decem, "ten"). It had 29 days. In the reform that resulted in a 12-month year, November became the eleventh month, but retained its name, as did the other months from September through December. A day was added to November during the Julian calendar reform in the mid-40s BC.

The outstanding event during November was the Plebeian Games from the 4th through the 17th. The month had few other festivals. It was under the guardianship (tutela) of Diana.

== In the agricultural year ==
The ancient farmers' almanacs (menologia rustica) instruct farmers to sow wheat and barley, and to attend to scribatio, trenching around trees.

== Iconography of the month ==
When the months are represented by agricultural activities, a man with a four-prong drag hoe (rastrum quadridens) can sometimes appear as November. In the Imperial period, the deity who often represents November in Roman art is Isis. The festival of Isis, which began October 28, continued through November 3. The Isia is first recorded on the menologia rustica, which date to the reign of either Caligula (36–39 AD) or Claudius (41–54). Both emperors favored the cult of Isis.

== Dates ==
The Romans did not number days of a month sequentially from the first day through the last. Instead, they counted back from the three fixed points of the month: the Nones (5th or 7th), the Ides (13th or 15th), and the Kalends (1st) of the following month. The Nones of November was the 5th, and the Ides the 13th. The last day of November was the pridie Kalendas Decembrīs, "day before the Kalends of December". Roman counting was inclusive; November 9 was ante diem V Idūs Novembrīs, "the 5th day before the Ides of November," usually abbreviated a.d. V Id. Nov. (or with the a.d. omitted altogether); November 23 was IX Kal. Dec., "the 9th day before the Kalends of December," on the Julian calendar, or VIII Kal. Dec. on the pre-Julian calendar.

On the calendar of the Roman Republic and early Principate, each day was marked with a letter to denote its religiously lawful status. In November, these were:

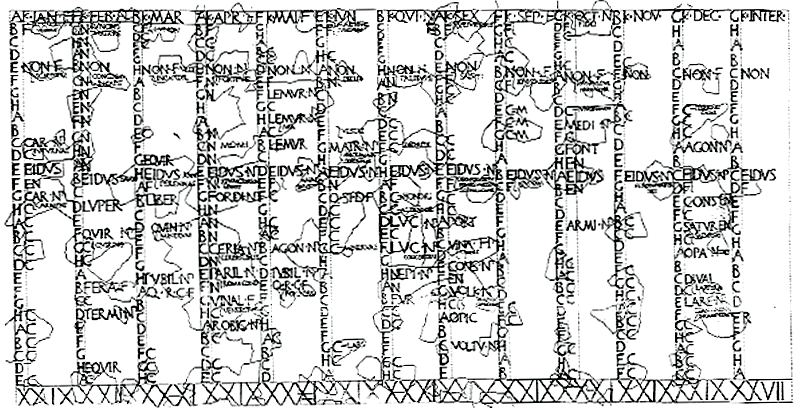
Drawing of the fragmentary Fasti Antiates, a pre-Julian calendar showing November (abbreviated NOV) at the top of the eleventh column

- F for dies fasti, days when it was legal to initiate action in the courts of civil law;
- C, for dies comitalis, a day on which the Roman people could hold assemblies (comitia), elections, and certain kinds of judicial proceedings;
- N for dies nefasti, when these political activities and the administration of justice were prohibited;
- NP, the meaning of which remains elusive, but which marked feriae, public holidays.

By the late 2nd century AD, extant calendars no longer show days marked with these letters, probably in part as a result of calendar reforms undertaken by Marcus Aurelius. Days were also marked with nundinal letters in cycles of A B C D E F G H, to mark the "market week" (these are omitted in the table below). The letter G never coincides with the Nones, and November is the only month when F occurs on a Nones.

On a dies religiosus, one of which appears November 14, individuals were not to undertake any new activity, nor do anything other than tend to the most basic necessities. A dies natalis was an anniversary such as a temple founding or rededication, sometimes thought of as the "birthday" of a deity. During the Imperial period, some of the traditional festivals localized at Rome became less important, and the birthdays and anniversaries of the emperor and his family gained prominence as Roman holidays. On the calendar of military religious observances known as the Feriale Duranum, sacrifices pertaining to Imperial cult outnumber the older festivals. After the mid-1st century AD, a number of dates are added to calendars for spectacles and games (ludi) held in honor of various deities in the venue called a "circus" (ludi circenses). Festivals marked in large letters on extant fasti, represented by festival names in all capital letters on the table, are thought to have been the most ancient holidays, becoming part of the calendar before 509 BC.

Unless otherwise noted, the dating and observances on the following table are from H.H. Scullard, Festivals and Ceremonies of the Roman Republic (Cornell University Press, 1981), pp. 196–198. After the Ides, dates for the Julian calendar are given; pre-Julian dates for particular events, when April had one less day, are noted parenthetically.

Modern date	Roman date	status	Observances
November 1	Kalendae Novembrīs	F	• conclusion of the seven-day Ludi Victoriae Sullanae ("Sullan Victory Games") • Isia, which began October 28, continues with the Heuresis, a "finding out" ceremony of the return to life of Osiris, with 24 circus races
2	a.d. IV Non. Nov.	F	• Isia continues with the Ter novena, a joyful performance by a choir of 27 men
3	III Non. Nov.	C	• Isia concludes with the Hilaria ("Rejoicing")
4	pridie Nonas Novembrīs (abbrev. prid. Non. Nov.)	C	• Plebeian Games begin
5	Nonae Novembrīs	F	• Plebeian Games continue
6	VIII Id. Nov.	F	• Plebeian Games continue
7	VII Id. Nov.	C	• Plebeian Games continue
8	VI Id. Nov.	C	• mundus patet, the third of three annual openings of a mysterious pit or storage chamber • Plebeian Games continue • dies natalis of Nerva, with circus games
9	V Id. Nov.	C	• Plebeian Games continue
10	IV Id. Nov.	C	• Plebeian Games continue • beginning of winter according to Varro
11	III Id. Nov.	C	
12	pridie Idūs Novembrīs (abbrev. prid. Id. Nov.)	C	• Plebeian Games continue
13	Idūs Novembrīs	NP	• monthly Feriae Iovis, a procession and sacrifice of a ram to Jove (Jupiter) on the arx • Epulum Iovi, a banquet for Jupiter • dies natalis of the temples of Feronia and Fortuna Primigenia • Plebeian Games continue
14	XVIII Kal. Dec.	F dies religiosus	• Plebeian Games continue (pre-Julian XVII Kal. Dec.) • probatio equorum ("review of the horses"), an equestrian procession of knights
15	XVII Kal. Dec.	C	• Plebeian Games continue (pre-Julian XVI Kal. Dec.)
16	XVI Kal. Dec.	C	• Plebeian Games continue (pre-Julian XV Kal. Dec.) • birthday of Tiberius, with a supplication to Vesta on the Feriale Cumanum (4–14 AD)
17	XV Kal. Dec.	C	• Plebeian Games conclude (pre-Julian XIV Kal. Dec.) • dies natalis of Vespasian, with circus games
18	XIV Kal. Dec.	C	• mercatus, fair or market days • dies natalis of a cult to Deus Sanctus Sol established by Licinius • new year in the province of Syria, and according to Clement of Alexandria the birth of Christ
19	XIII Kal. Dec.	C	• mercatus continue
20	XII Kal. Dec.	C	• mercatus continue
21	XI Kal. Dec.	C	
22	X Kal. Dec.	C	
23	IX Kal. Dec.	C	
24	VIII Kal. Dec.	C	• bruma, beginning of the Brumalia
25	VII Kal. Dec.	C	
26	VI Kal. Dec.	C	
27	V Kal. Dec.	C	
28	IV Kal. Dec.	C	
29	III Kal. Dec.	C	
