= Cerealia =

Ancient Roman spring festival

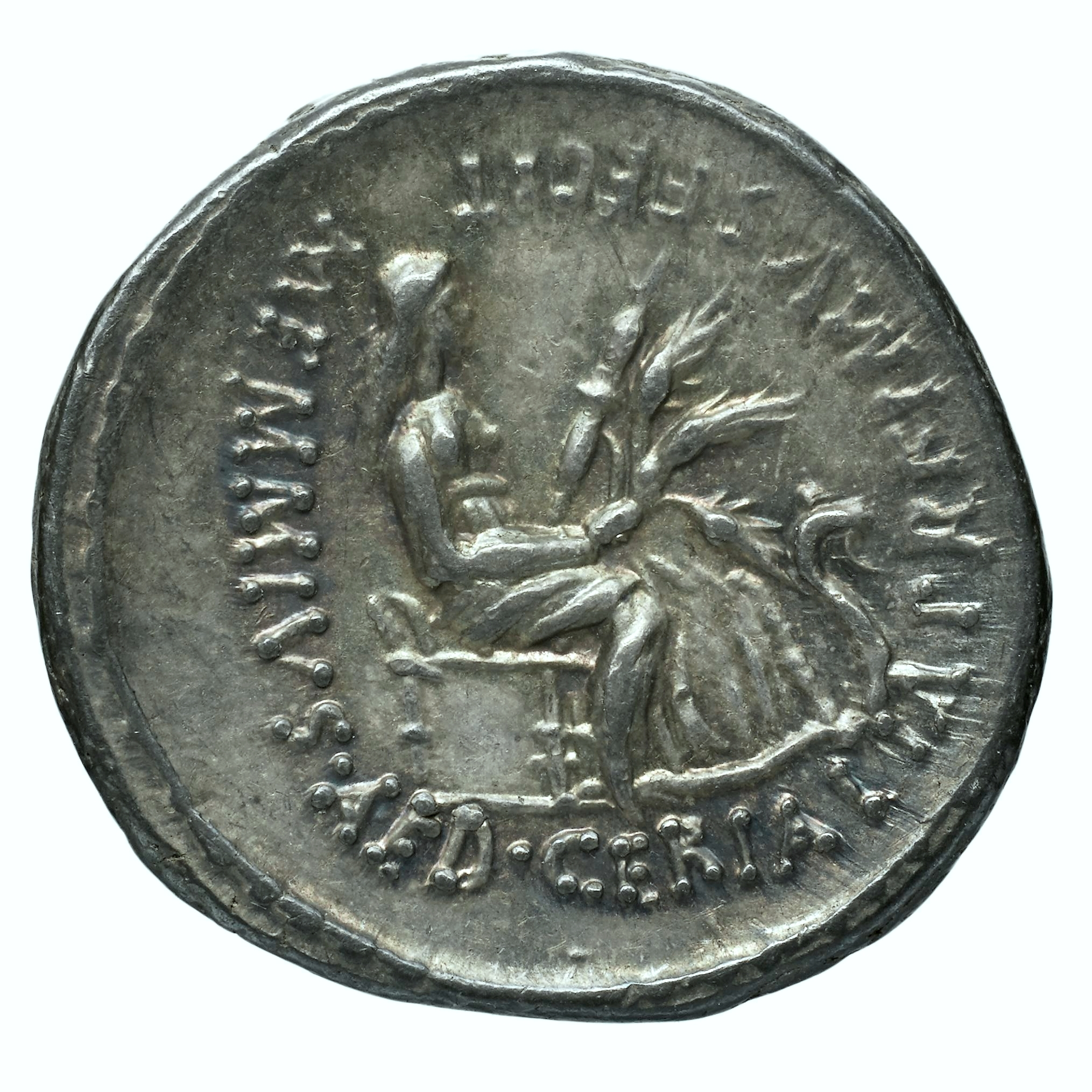
A denarius of 56 BC commemorating the first staging of the Cerealia by a Gaius Memmius serving as aedile, depicting a seated Ceres with unusually long tresses, and holding her characteristic torch and stalks of grain

In ancient Roman religion, the Cerealia /sɪəriːˈeɪliə/ was the major festival celebrated for the grain goddess Ceres. It was held for seven days in the latter part of April, along with various agricultural festivals during the month. The Cerealia celebrated the harvest, and may have begun on the 19th. Surviving descriptions of Rome's city festival of Ceres are presumably urban versions of an originally rustic, agricultural festival. In his treatise on agriculture, Cato the Elder recommends that farmers sacrifice a sow (porca praecidanea) to Ceres, before the harvest.

The Cerealia is listed on the oldest Roman calendars, and its institution in the city is attributed to the semi-legendary King Numa, in the earliest Regal period. The festival's archaic, agricultural nature is shown by a nighttime ritual described by Ovid. Blazing torches were tied to the tails of live foxes, who were released, possibly into the Circus Maximus. The origin and purpose of this ritual is unknown; it may have been intended to cleanse the growing crops and protect them from disease and vermin, or to add warmth and vitality to their growth. Ovid offers an aetiological explanation: long ago, at ancient Carleoli, a farm-boy caught a fox stealing chickens and tried to burn it alive. The fox escaped, ablaze; in its flight it set fire to the fields and their crops. As these were both sacred to Ceres, foxes are punished at her festival ever since.

Ludi Ceriales or "Games of Ceres" were held as part of the festival in the Circus Maximus. Ovid mentions a ritual in which Ceres's search for her lost daughter Proserpina was represented by women clothed in white, running about with lighted torches; this probably refers to Thesmophoria elements in Ceres's native cults, and the identification of Rome's native goddess Libera with Proserpina

During the Republican era, the Cerealia and most other public religious festivals were organised by the plebeian aediles. Theirs was an elected position, with both political and religious obligations; Ceres was one of the patron deities of the plebs or common people. The Cerealia was an occasion for exclusively plebeian banquets. The Cerealia festival included ludi circenses (circus games), which opened with a horse race in the Circus Maximus. The starting place was just below the Aventine Temple of Ceres, Liber and Libera. After around 175 BC, the Cerealia included ludi scaenici, theatrical performances with religious dimensions, held April 12–18. The plebeian aedile Gaius Memmius is credited with staging the first of these ludi scaenici, and distributing a new commemorative denarius coin in honor of the event. This was an indirect appeal for continued political support in the distribution of free or subsidised grain, a particular interest of the plebs. His innovations led to his claim to have presented "the first Cerealia".

Rome's traditional religious festivals, including the Cerealia, were still managed by aediles in the Imperial era, until the banning of pagan cults and festivals. Cerealia is marked in the Calendar of Philocalus, 354 AD

Near London in the 1880s a sea-side "vegetarian home" (bed and breakfast) was named Cerealia, probably from the word cereal (grain).

== See also ==
- Roman festivals
- Eleusinian Mysteries
