= Brumalia =

Ancient Roman religious festival

The Brumalia (Latin: Brumalia [bruːˈmaːlia]) was a winter solstice festival celebrated in the eastern part of the Roman Empire. In Rome there had been the minor holiday of Bruma on November 24, which turned into large scale end of the year festivities in Constantinople and Christianity. The festival included night-time feasting, drinking, and merriment. During this time, prophetic indications were taken as predictions for the remainder of the winter. Despite the 6th century emperor Justinian's official repression of paganism, the holiday was celebrated at least until the 11th century, as recorded by Christopher of Mytilene. No references exist after the 1204 sacking of the capital by the Fourth Crusade.

== Etymology ==
The name of Brumalia comes from bruma, [ˈbruːma], "winter solstice", "winter cold", a shortening of *brevima, [ˈbrɛwɪma], presumed obsolete superlative form of brevis, later brevissima ("smallest", "shallowest", "briefest").

== Overview ==
The Roman "Bruma" is known only from a few passing remarks, none of which predates Imperial times. Mentions of the Brumalia are found after the IV c. Against the Church disapproval John Malalas and John the Lydian used rhetoric that claimed their introduction by Romulus himself.

Roman life during classical antiquity centred on the military, agriculture, and hunting. The short, cold days of winter would halt most forms of work. Brumalia was a festival celebrated during this dark, interludal period. It was chthonic in character and associated with crops, of which seeds are sown in the ground before sprouting.

Farmers would sacrifice pigs to Saturn and Ceres. Vine-growers would sacrifice goats in honor of Bacchus—for the goat is an enemy of the vine; and they would skin them, fill the skin-bags with air and jump on them. Civic officials would bring offerings of firstfruits (including wine, olive oil, grain, and honey) to the priests of Ceres.

Although Brumalia was still celebrated as late as the 6th century, it was uncommon and celebrants were ostracised by the Christian church. However, some practices did persist as November and December time customs.

In later times, Romans would greet each other with words of blessing at night, "Vives annos", "Live for years".

== Contemporary celebration ==
It has been revived as a festival annually held by Connecticut College.
