= Ieiunium Cereris =

The Ieiunium Cereris (Latin: the fast of Ceres) was a Roman festival devoted to the goddess Ceres, observed on the 4th of October (on the 4th day prior to the Nones of October), during which its participants refrained from consuming food. Titus Livius remarked that it was instituted in the year 191 BC according to the Sibylline Books and used to occur every fifth year; during the era of Augustus, it started to be commemorated on a yearly basis.
