= Vica Pota =

Roman goddess

In ancient Roman religion, Vica Pota was a goddess whose shrine (aedes) was located at the foot of the Velian Hill, on the site of the domus of Publius Valerius Publicola. This location would place the temple on the same side of the Velia as the Forum and perhaps not far from the Regia. Cicero explains her name as deriving from vincendi atque potiundi, "conquering and gaining mastery."

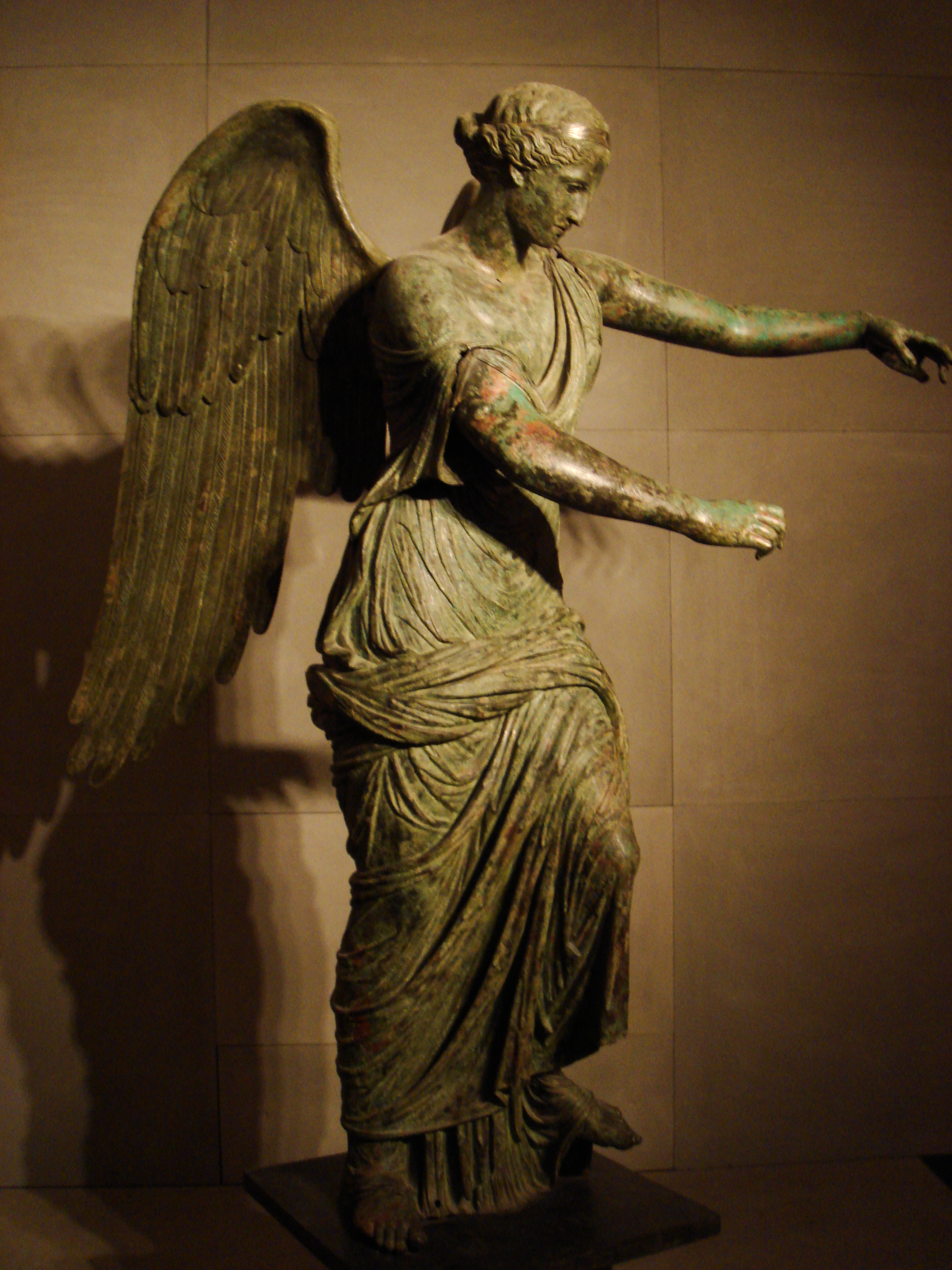
Winged Victory of Brescia, 1st century BC: the earlier goddess Vica Pota became identified with Victory personified

In the Apocolocyntosis, Vica Pota is the mother of Diespiter; although usually identified with Jupiter, Diespiter is here treated as a separate deity, and in the view of Arthur Bernard Cook should perhaps be regarded as the chthonic Dispater. The festival of Vica Pota was January 5.

Asconius identifies her with Victoria, but she is probably an earlier Roman or Italic form of victory goddess that predated Victoria and the influence of Greek Nike; Vica Pota was thus the older equivalent of Victoria but probably not a personification of victory as such. In a conjecture not widely accepted, Ludwig Preller thought that Vica Pota might be identified with the Etruscan divine figure Lasa Vecu.

== See also ==
- Vacuna, sometimes also identified as a goddess of victory
