= Sementivae =

Religious observance in ancient Rome

Sementivae, also known as Feriae Sementivae or Sementina dies (in the country called Paganalia), was a Roman festival of sowing.

It was a type of feriae conceptivae [or conceptae]. These free days were held every year, but not on certain or fixed days, the time being every year appointed by the magistrates or priests (quotannis a magistratibus vel sacerdotibus concipiuntur).

It was held in honor of Ceres (the goddess of agriculture) and Tellus (Mother Earth). The initial half of the event was a festival in honor of Tellus which ran from January 24 through January 26. The festival honoring Ceres occurred one week later, starting February 2. The Sementina dies were kept in seed-time at Rome for the purpose of praying for a good crop; it lasted only for one day, which was fixed by the pontiffs. At the same time the Paganalia were observed in the country.
