= Sororium Tigillum =

The Sororium Tigillum, which translates as the "sister's beam", was a wooden beam said to have been erected on the slope of the Oppian Hill in Ancient Rome by the father of Publius Horatius, one of the three brothers Horatii. Publius Horatius was required to pass under the beam, as if under a yoke, following the decision of the people's assembly to not punish him for the murder of his sister.

According to Livy, writing at the end of the 1st century BC, the Sororium Tigillum remained intact in Rome until his day, having been maintained at the public expense.

== Sources ==
- Livy, Ab urbe condita, 1:26
- CIL 6.32482
- Platner, S. B, and T. Ashby. 1929. "Tigillum Sororium." In A Topographical Dictionary of Ancient Rome. Oxford: Clarendon Press.
