= Meditrinalia =

Roman festival

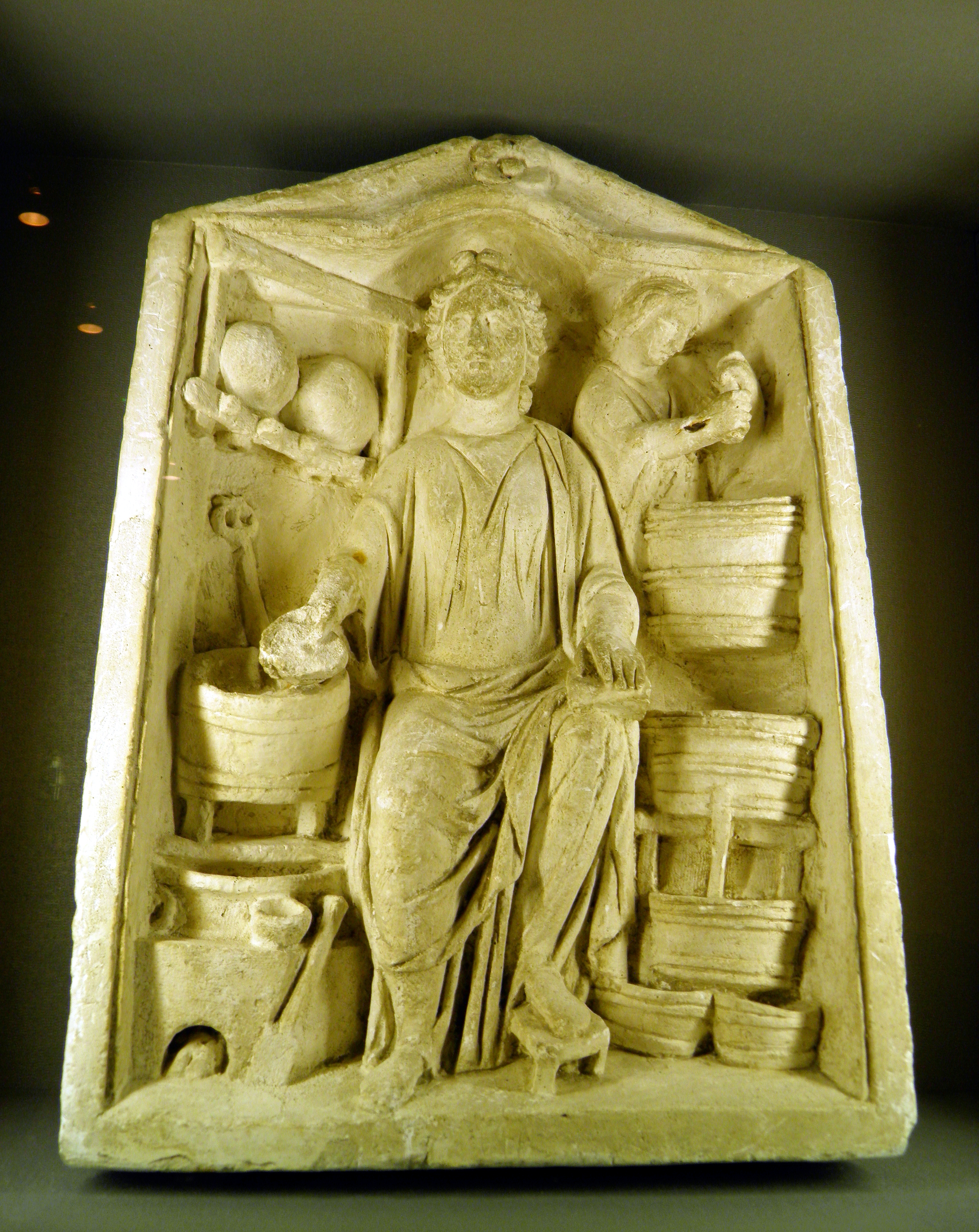
- Relief of Meditrina, Roman Goddess of Wine and Health, 1st half of 2nd century AD, from Andesina, France.
- Observed by: Roman Republic; Roman Empire
- Type: Classical Roman religion
- Observances: libations
- Date: October 11
- Related to: new vintage

The Meditrinalia was a festival in the traditional Roman religion, celebrated on October 11 in honor of the new vintage, which was offered as libations to the gods for the first time each year. Though now obscure, the festival may have been so called from medendo, Latin for "healing", because the Romans then began to drink new wine, which they mixed with old and considered to have healing properties.

Little information about the Meditrinalia survived from early Roman religion, although the tradition itself did. It was known to be somehow connected to Jupiter and to have been an important ceremony in early agricultural Rome, but beyond that, only speculation exists.

A goddess, Meditrina, seems to have been a late Roman invention to account for the origin of the festival. The earliest account associating the Meditrinalia with such a goddess was of the 2nd century grammarian Sextus Pompeius Festus, on the basis of which Meditrina is asserted by modern sources to be the Roman goddess of health, longevity and wine, with an etymological meaning of "healer" suggested by some.
