= Ceres (mythology) =

Roman goddess of agriculture

- Goddess of agriculture, fertility, grains, the harvest, motherhood, the earth, and cultivated crops
- Member of the Dii Consentes and the Aventine Triad
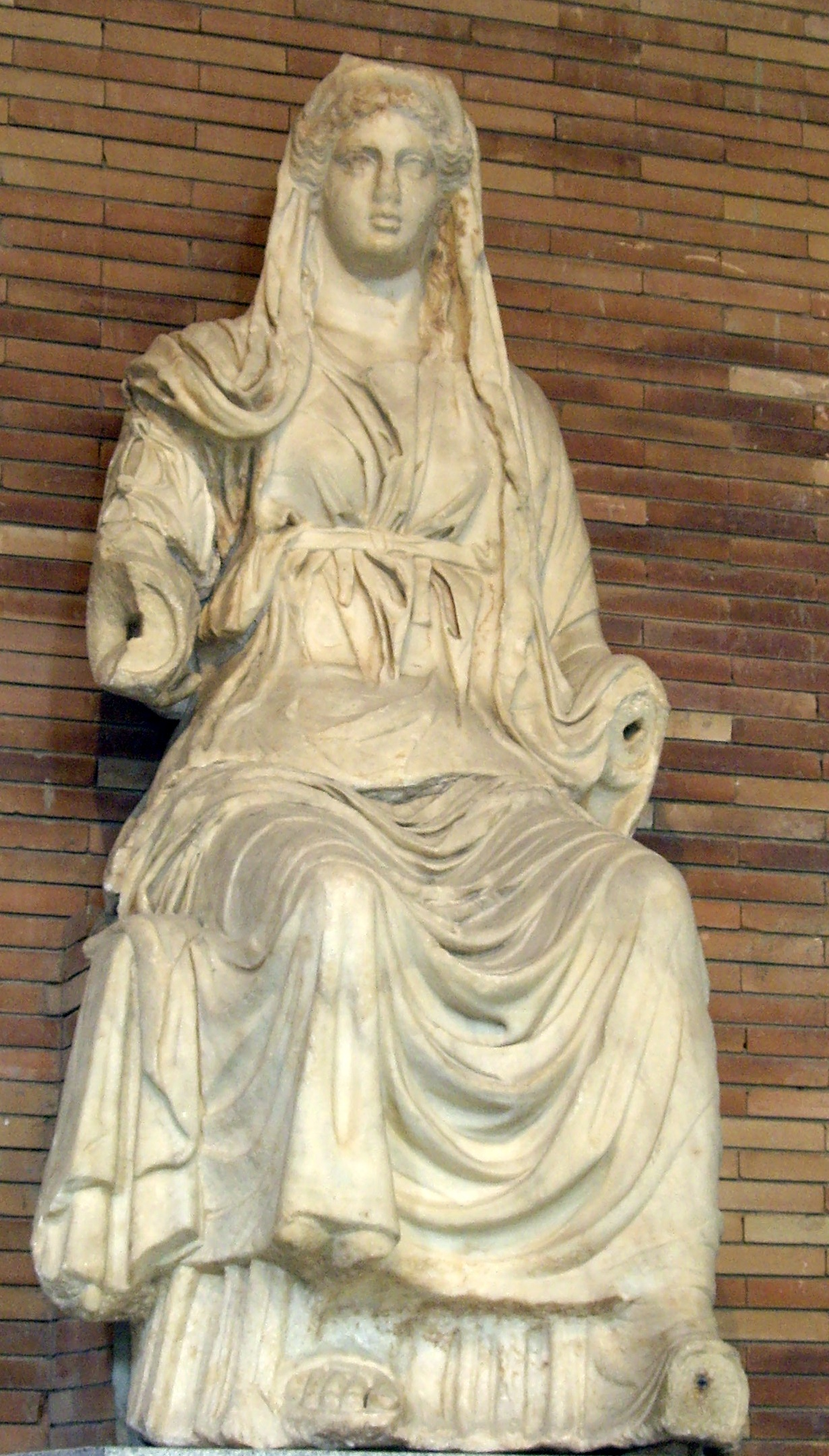
- Seated Ceres from Emerita Augusta, present-day Mérida, Spain (National Museum of Roman Art, 1st century AD)
- Symbol: sickle, torches, wheat-sheaf, crown of wheatstalks, cornucopia with fruits, cereals, poppy
- Festivals: Cerealia, Ambarvalia

Genealogy
- Parents: Saturn and Ops
- Siblings: Jupiter, Juno, Neptune, Vesta, Pluto
- Children: Liber/Bacchus, Libera/Proserpina

Equivalents
- Greek: Demeter
- Egyptian: Isis

In ancient Roman religion, Ceres (/ˈsɪəriːz/ SEER-eez, Latin: [ˈkɛreːs]) was a goddess of agriculture, grain crops, fertility, and motherly relationships. She was originally the central deity in Rome's so-called plebeian or Aventine Triad, then was paired with her daughter Proserpina in what Romans described as "the Greek rites of Ceres". Her seven-day April festival of Cerealia included the popular Ludi Ceriales (Ceres's games). She was also honoured in the May lustration (lustratio) of the fields at the Ambarvalia festival, at harvesttime, and during Roman marriages and funeral rites. She is usually depicted as a mature woman.

Ceres is the only one of Rome's many agricultural deities to be listed among the Dii Consentes, Rome's equivalent to the Twelve Olympians of Greek mythology. The Romans saw her as the counterpart of the Greek goddess Demeter, whose mythology was reinterpreted for Ceres in Roman art and literature.

== Etymology and origins ==
The name Cerēs stems from Proto-Italic *kerēs ('with grain, Ceres'; cf. Faliscan ceres, Oscan kerrí ('Cererī' < *ker-s-ēi- < *ker-es-ēi-), ultimately from Proto-Indo-European *ḱerh₃-os ('nourishment, grain'), a derivative of the root *ḱerh₃-, meaning 'to feed'.

The Proto-Italic adjective *keresjo- ('belonging to Ceres') can also be reconstructed from terms such as Oscan kerríiúí (fem. kerríiai). A masculine form *keres-o- ('with grain, Cerrus') is possibly attested in Umbrian śerfe. The spelling of Latin Cerus, a masculine form of Ceres denoting the creator (cf. Cerus manus 'creator bonus', duonus Cerus 'good Cerus'), might also reflect Cerrus, which would match the other Italic forms.

Archaic cults to Ceres are well-evidenced among Rome's neighbours in the Regal period, including the ancient Latins, Oscans and Sabellians, less certainly among the Etruscans and Umbrians. An archaic Faliscan inscription of c. 600 BC asks her to provide far (spelt wheat), which was a dietary staple of the Mediterranean world. Ancient Roman etymologists thought that ceres derived from the Latin verb gerere, "to bear, bring forth, produce", because the goddess was linked to pastoral, agricultural and human fertility. Throughout the Roman era, Ceres's name was synonymous with grain and, by extension, with bread.

== Cults and cult themes ==
=== Agricultural fertility ===
Ceres was credited with the discovery of spelt wheat (Latin far), the yoking of oxen and ploughing, the sowing, protection and nourishing of the young seed, and the gift of agriculture to humankind; before this, it was said, man had subsisted on acorns, and wandered without settlement or laws. She had the power to fertilize, multiply and fructify plant and animal seed, and her laws and rites protected all activities of the agricultural cycle. In January, Ceres (alongside the earth-goddess Tellus) was offered spelt wheat and a pregnant sow, at the movable Feriae Sementivae. This was almost certainly held before the annual sowing of grain. The divine portion of sacrifice was the entrails (exta) presented in an earthenware pot (olla). In a rural, agricultural context, Cato the Elder describes the offer to Ceres of a porca praecidanea (a pig, offered before harvesting). Before the harvest, she was offered a propitiary grain sample (praemetium). Ovid tells that Ceres "is content with little, provided that her offerings are casta" (pure).

Ceres's main festival, the Cerealia, was held from mid to late April. It was organised by her plebeian aediles and included circus games (ludi circenses). It opened with a horse-race in the Circus Maximus, whose starting point lay below and opposite to her temple atop the Aventine Hill; the turning post at the far end of the Circus was sacred to Consus, a god of grain-storage. After the race, foxes were released into the Circus, their tails ablaze with lighted torches, perhaps to cleanse the growing crops and protect them from disease and vermin, or to add warmth and vitality to their growth. From c. 175 BC, the Cerealia included ludi scaenici (theatrical religious events) through April 12 to 18.

==== Helper gods ====
In the ancient sacrum cereale a priest, probably the Flamen Cerialis, invoked Ceres (and probably Tellus) along with twelve specialised, minor assistant-gods to secure divine help and protection at each stage of the grain cycle, beginning shortly before the Feriae Sementivae. W.H. Roscher lists these deities among the indigitamenta, names used to invoke specific divine functions.

- Vervactor, "He who ploughs"
- Reparātor, "He who prepares the earth"
- Imporcĭtor, "He who ploughs with a wide furrow"
- Insitor, "He who plants seeds"
- Obarātor, "He who traces the first ploughing"
- Occātor, "He who harrows"
- Serritor, "He who digs"
- Subruncinator, "He who weeds"
- Mĕssor, "He who reaps"
- Convector, "He who carries the grain"
- Conditor, "He who stores the grain"
- Promitor, "He who distributes the grain"

=== Marriage, human fertility and nourishment ===
In Roman bridal processions, a young boy carried Ceres's torch to light the way; "the most auspicious wood for wedding torches came from the spina alba, the May-tree, which bore many fruits and hence symbolised fertility". The adult males of the wedding party waited at the groom's house. A wedding sacrifice was offered to Tellus on the bride's behalf; a sow is the most likely victim. Varro describes the sacrifice of a pig as "a worthy mark of weddings" because "our women, and especially nurses" call the female genitalia porcus (pig). Barbette Spaeth (1996) believes Ceres may have been included in the sacrificial dedication, because she is closely identified with Tellus and, as Ceres legifera (law-bearer), she "bears the laws" of marriage. In the most solemn form of marriage, confarreatio, the bride and groom shared a cake made of far, the ancient wheat-type particularly associated with Ceres.

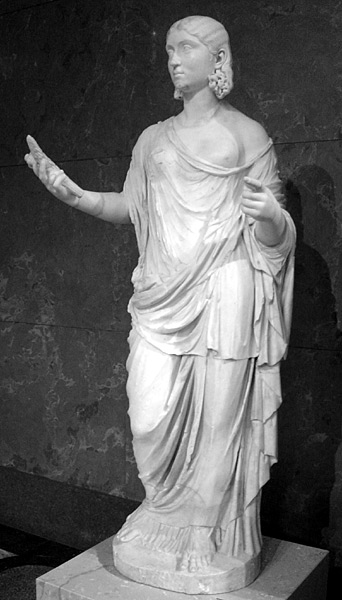
Funerary statue of an unknown woman, depicted as Ceres holding wheat. Mid 3rd century AD. (Louvre)

From at least the mid-Republican era, an official, joint cult to Ceres and Proserpina reinforced Ceres's connection with Roman ideals of female virtue. The promotion of this cult coincides with the rise of a plebeian nobility, an increased birthrate among plebeian commoners, and a fall in the birthrate among patrician families. The late Republican Ceres Mater (Mother Ceres) is described as genetrix (progenitress) and alma (nourishing); in the early Imperial era she becomes an Imperial deity, and receives joint cult with Ops Augusta, Ceres's own mother in Imperial guise and a bountiful genetrix in her own right. Several of Ceres's ancient Italic precursors are connected to human fertility and motherhood; the Pelignan goddess Angitia Cerealis has been identified with the Roman goddess Angerona (associated with childbirth).

=== Laws ===
Ceres was the patron and protector of plebeian laws, rights and Tribunes. Her Aventine Temple served the plebeians as cult centre, legal archive, treasury and possibly law-court; its foundation was contemporaneous with the passage of the Lex Sacrata, which established the office and person of plebeian aediles and tribunes as inviolate representatives of the Roman people. Tribunes were legally immune to arrest or threat, and the lives and property of those who violated this law were forfeit to Ceres.

The Lex Hortensia of 287 BC extended plebeian laws to the city and all its citizens. The official decrees of the Senate (senatus consulta) were placed in Ceres's temple, under the guardianship of the goddess and her aediles. Livy puts the reason bluntly: the consuls could no longer seek advantage for themselves by arbitrarily tampering with the laws of Rome. The temple might also have offered asylum for those threatened with arbitrary arrest by patrician magistrates. Ceres's temple, games and cult were at least partly funded by fines imposed on those who offended the laws placed under her protection; the poet Vergil later calls her legifera Ceres ("law-bearing Ceres"), a translation of Demeter's Greek epithet, Thesmophoros.

As Ceres's first plough-furrow opened the earth (Tellus's realm) to the world of men and created the first field and its boundary, her laws determined the course of settled, lawful, civilised life. Crimes against fields and harvest were crimes against the people and their protective deity. Landowners who allowed their flocks to graze on public land were fined by the plebeian aediles, on behalf of Ceres and the people of Rome. Ancient laws of the Twelve Tables forbade the magical charming of field crops from a neighbour's field into one's own, and invoked the death penalty for the illicit removal of field boundaries. An adult who damaged or stole field-crops should be hanged "for Ceres". Any youth guilty of the same offense was to be whipped or fined double the value of damage.

=== Poppies ===
Ceres's signs and iconography, like Demeter's from early Mycenae onwards, include poppies - symbolic of fertility, sleep, death, and rebirth. Poppies readily grow on soil disturbed by ploughing, as in wheatfields, and bear innumerable tiny seeds. They were raised as a crop by Greek and Roman farmers, partly for their fibrous stems and for the food value of their seeds Where the poppy capsule alone is shown, this probably belongs to the opium poppy (papaver somniferum, the "sleep-bearing poppy"). The Roman poet Vergil, in his Georgics (1.212), describes this as Cereale papaver, or "Ceres's poppy", which eases pain and brings sleep - the deepest sleep of all being death. Poppies are often woven into Ceres's wheat-stalk crown, the corona spicea, worn by her priestesses and devotees.

=== Funerals ===
Ceres maintained the boundaries between the realms of the living and the dead, and was an essential presence at funerals. Given acceptable rites and sacrifice, she helped the deceased into the afterlife as an underworld shade, or deity (Di Manes). Those whose death was premature, unexpected or untimely were thought to remain in the upper world, and haunt the living as a wandering, vengeful ghost (Lemur). They could be exorcised, but only when their death was reasonably due. For her service at burials or cremations, well-off families offered Ceres sacrifice of a pig. The poor could offer wheat, flowers, and a libation. The expected afterlife for the exclusively female initiates in the sacra Cereris may have been somewhat different; they were offered "a method of living" and of "dying with better hope".

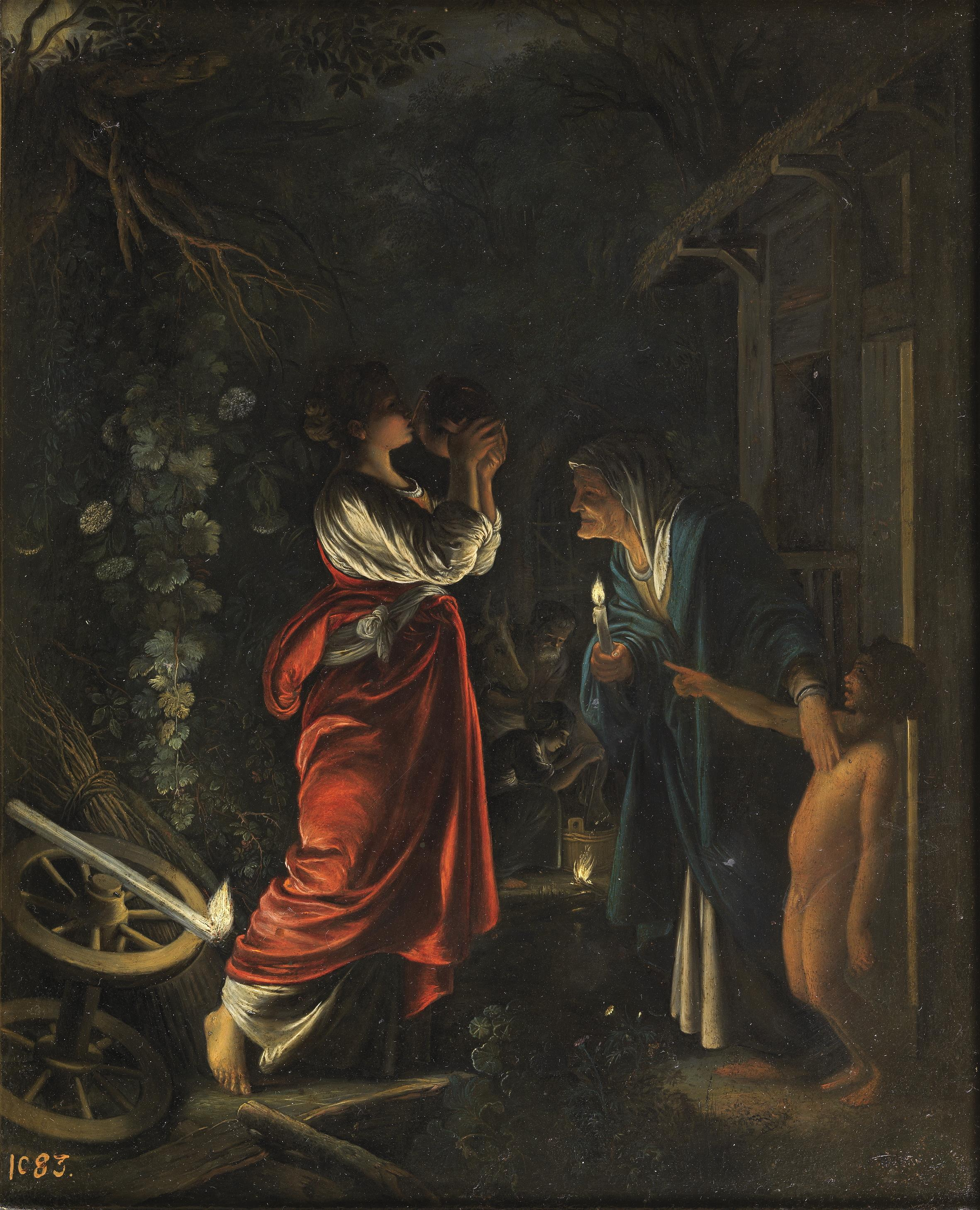
During her long, torch-lit search for her daughter, Proserpina, Ceres drinks water given her by Hecuba, and is mocked by the boy, Askalabos, for spilling some of it. She will transform him into a lowly "star-lizard' or newt (Latin; stellio) as punishment. The episode is in Ovid's, Metamorphoses V, lines 449-450. Oil-paint on copper, by Adam Elsheimer and workshop, copy circa 1605, held by the Museo Nacional del Prado. From an original in the collection of Alfred and Isabel Bader

=== The mundus of Ceres ===
The mundus cerialis or Caereris mundus ("the world of Ceres") was a hemispherical pit or underground vault in Rome, now lost. (Note: Various candidates for its location include the site of Rome's Comitium and the Palatine Hill, within the city's ritual boundary (pomerium)) It was usually sealed by a stone lid known as the lapis manalis. (Note: Apparently not the same Lapis manalis used by the pontifices to alleviate droughts.) On August 24, October 5 and November 8, it was opened with the official announcement mundus patet ("the mundus is open") and offerings were made there to agricultural or underworld deities, including Ceres as goddess of the fruitful earth and guardian of its underworld portals. Its opening offered the spirits of the dead temporary leave from the underworld to roam lawfully among the living, in what Warde Fowler describes as 'holidays, so to speak, for the ghosts'. The days when the mundus was open were among the very few occasions that Romans made official contact with the collective spirits of the dead, the Di Manes (the others being Parentalia and Lemuralia). This possibly secondary or late function of the mundus is first attested in the Late Republican Era, by Varro. The jurist Cato understood the shape of the mundus as a reflection or inversion of the dome of the upper heavens. Di Luzio observes that the Roman mundus shared functional and conceptual similarities with certain types of underground "pit altar" or megaron, used in Demeter's Thesmophoria.

Roman tradition held that the mundus had been dug and sealed by Romulus as part of Rome's foundation; Plutarch compares it to pits dug by Etruscan colonists, containing soil brought from their parent city, used to dedicate the first fruits of the harvest. Warde Fowler speculates the mundus as Rome's first storehouse (penus) for seed-grain, later becoming the symbolic penus of the Roman state. In the oldest known Roman calendar, the days of the mundus are marked as C(omitiales) (days when the Comitia met). Later authors mark them as dies religiosus (when no official meetings could be held). Some modern scholars seek to explain this as the later introduction and accommodation of Greek elements, grafted onto the original mundus rites. The rites of August 24 were held between the agricultural festivals of Consualia and Opiconsivia; those of October 5 followed the Ieiunium Cereris, and those of November 8 took place during the Plebeian Games. As a whole, the various days of the mundus suggest rites to Ceres as the guardian deity of seed-corn in the establishment of cities, and as a door-warden of the afterlife, which was co-ruled during the winter months by her daughter Proserpina, queen-companion to Dis.

=== Expiations ===
In Roman theology, prodigies were abnormal phenomena that manifested divine anger at human impiety. In Roman histories, prodigies cluster around perceived or actual threats to the Roman state, in particular, famine, war and social disorder, and are expiated as matters of urgency. The establishment of Ceres's Aventine cult has itself been interpreted as an extraordinary expiation after the failure of crops and consequent famine. In Livy's history, Ceres is among the deities placated after a remarkable series of prodigies that accompanied the disasters of the Second Punic War: during the same conflict, a lightning strike at her temple was expiated. A fast in her honour is recorded for 191 BC, to be repeated at 5-year intervals. After 206 BC, she was offered at least 11 further official expiations. Many of these were connected to famine and manifestations of plebeian unrest, rather than war. From the Middle Republic onwards, expiation was increasingly addressed to her as mother to Proserpina. The last known followed Rome's Great Fire of 64 AD. The cause or causes of the fire remained uncertain, but its disastrous extent was taken as a sign of offense against Juno, Vulcan, and Ceres-with-Proserpina, who were all given expiatory cult. Champlin (2003) perceives the expiations to Vulcan and Ceres in particular as attempted populist appeals by the ruling emperor, Nero.

== Myths and theology ==
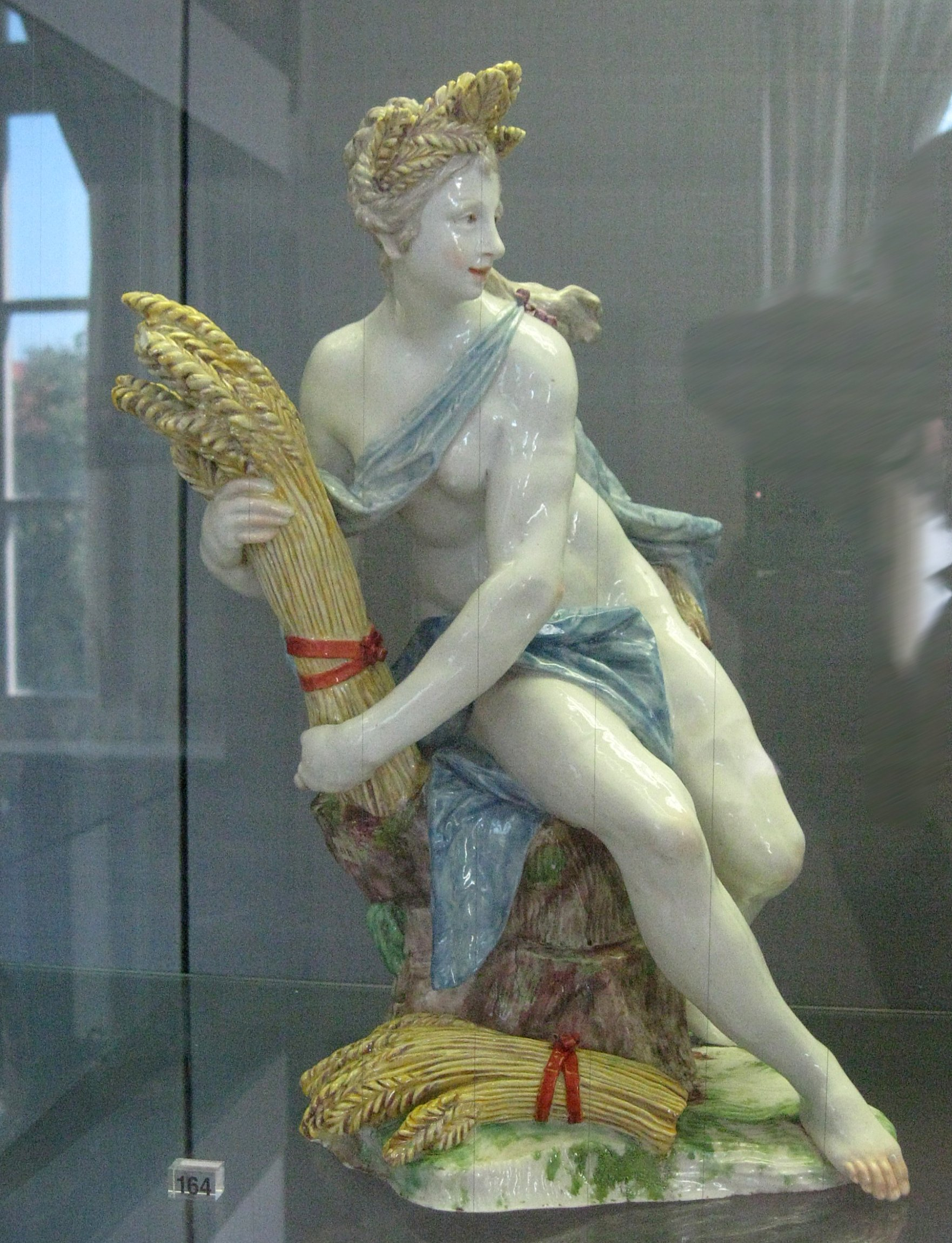
Ceres holding a bundle of cereal grains, a late 18th century work by Dominik Auliczek of the Nymphenburg Porcelain Manufactory

The complex and multi-layered origins of the Aventine Triad and Ceres herself allowed multiple interpretations of their relationships, beyond the humanised pattern of relations within the Triad; while Cicero asserts Ceres as mother to both Liber and Libera, consistent with her role as a mothering deity, Varro's more complex theology groups her functionally with Tellus, Terra, Venus (and thus Victoria) and with Libera as a female aspect of Liber. No native Roman myths of Ceres are known. According to interpretatio romana, by which Roman deities were identified with their Greek counterparts, she was an equivalent to Demeter, one of the Twelve Olympians of Greek religion and mythology; this made Ceres one of Rome's twelve Di Consentes, daughter of Saturn and Ops, sister of Jupiter, mother of Proserpina by Jupiter and sister of Juno, Vesta, Neptune, and Dis. Ceres's known mythology is indistinguishable from Demeter's:

When Ceres sought through all the earth with lit torches for Proserpina, who had been seized by Dis Pater, she called her with shouts where three or four roads meet; from this it has endured in her rites that on certain days a lamentation is raised at the crossroads everywhere by the matronae.

Ovid likens Ceres's devotion to her own offspring to that of a cow to its calf; but she is also the originator of bloody animal sacrifice, a necessity in the renewal of life. She has a particular enmity towards her own sacrificial animal, the pig. Pigs offend her by their destructive rooting-up of field crops under her protection; and in the myth of Proserpina's abduction on the plains of Henna (Enna), her tracks were obscured by their trampling. If not for them, Ceres might have been spared the toils and grief of her lengthy search and separation, and humankind would have been spared the consequent famine. The myth is also a reminder that the gift of agriculture is a contract, and comes at a price. It brings well-being but also mortality. Enna, in Sicily, had strong mythological connections with Ceres and Proserpina, and was the site of the goddess' most ancient sanctuary. Flowers were said to bloom throughout the year on its "miraculous plain".

== Temples ==
Vitruvius (c. 80 – 15 BC) describes the "Temple of Ceres near the Circus Maximus" (her Aventine Temple) as typically Araeostyle, having widely spaced supporting columns, with architraves of wood, rather than stone. This species of temple is "clumsy, heavy roofed, low and wide, [its] pediments ornamented with statues of clay or brass, gilt in the Tuscan fashion". He recommends that temples to Ceres be sited in rural areas: "in a solitary spot out of the city, to which the public are not necessarily led but for the purpose of sacrificing to her. This spot is to be reverenced with religious awe and solemnity of demeanour, by those whose affairs lead them to visit it." During the early Imperial era, soothsayers advised Pliny the Younger to restore an ancient, "old and narrow" temple to Ceres, at his rural property near Como. It contained an ancient wooden cult statue of the goddess, which he replaced. Though this was an unofficial and privately funded cult (sacra privata), its annual feast on the Ides of September was attended by pilgrims from all over the region; this feast was also the same day as the Epulum Jovis. Pliny considered this rebuilding a fulfillment of his civic and religious duty.

=== Images of Ceres ===
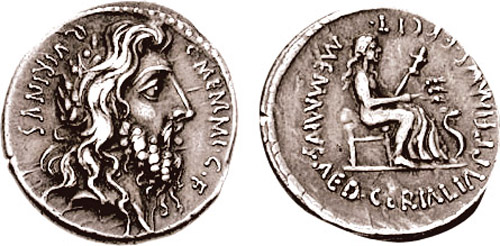
Denarius picturing Quirinus on the obverse, and Ceres enthroned on the reverse, a commemoration by a moneyer in 56 BC of a Cerialia, perhaps her first ludi, presented by an earlier Gaius Memmius as aedile

No images of Ceres survive from her pre-Aventine cults; the earliest date to the middle Republic, and show the Hellenising influence of Demeter's iconography. Some late Republican images recall Ceres's search for Proserpina. Ceres bears a torch, sometimes two, and rides in a chariot drawn by snakes; or she sits on the sacred kiste (chest) that conceals the objects of her mystery rites. Sometimes she holds a caduceus, a symbol of Pax (Roman goddess of Peace). Augustan reliefs show her emergence, plant-like from the earth, her arms entwined by snakes, her outstretched hands bearing poppies and wheat, or her head crowned with fruits and vines. In free-standing statuary, she commonly wears a wheat-crown, or holds a wheat spray. Moneyers of the Republican era use Ceres's image, wheat ears and garlands to advertise their connections with prosperity, the annona and the popular interest. Some Imperial coin images depict important female members of the Imperial family as Ceres, or with some of her attributes.

== Priesthoods ==
Ceres was served by several public priesthoods. Some were male; her senior priest, the flamen cerialis, also served Tellus and was usually plebeian by ancestry or adoption. Her public cult at the Ambarvalia, or "perambulation of fields" identified her with Dea Dia, and was led by the Arval Brethren ("The Brothers of the Fields"); rural versions of these rites were led as private cult by the heads of households. An inscription at Capua names a male sacerdos Cerialis mundalis, a priest dedicated to Ceres's rites of the mundus. The plebeian aediles had minor or occasional priestly functions at Ceres's Aventine Temple and were responsible for its management and financial affairs including collection of fines, the organisation of ludi Cerealia and probably the Cerealia itself. Their cure (care and jurisdiction) included, or came to include, the grain supply (annona) and later the plebeian grain doles (frumentationes), the organisation and management of public games in general, and the maintenance of Rome's streets and public buildings.

Otherwise, in Rome and throughout Italy, as at her ancient sanctuaries of Henna and Catena, Ceres's ritus graecus and her joint cult with Proserpina were invariably led by female sacerdotes, drawn from local and Roman elites: Cicero notes that once the new cult had been founded, its earliest priestesses "generally were either from Naples or Velia", cities allied or federated to Rome. Elsewhere, he describes Ceres's Sicilian priestesses as "older women respected for their noble birth and character". Celibacy may have been a condition of their office; sexual abstinence was, according to Ovid, required of those attending Ceres's major, nine-day festival. Her public priesthood was reserved to respectable matrons, be they married, divorced or widowed. The process of their selection and their relationship to Ceres's older, entirely male priesthood is unknown; but they far outnumbered her few male priests, and would have been highly respected and influential figures in their own communities.

== Cult development ==
=== In Sabellic cultures ===
The Agnone Tablet, a 3rd-century BCE Oscan inscription, describes the worship of Ceres within a certain sacred site. The term utilized to describe this site—húrz—is of unclear meaning and is varyingly translated as "sanctuary," "sacred grove," or "enclosure." Nevertheless, the tablet records 15 ritual activities occurring at the site within the space of a year, which—according to the archaeologist Rafael Scopasca—indicates that ritual activities likely occurred at the ceremony at least once a month. These services likely catered towards numerous different groups, perhaps with worshippers varying across each ceremony. Scopasca notes that the act of documenting the dates of temple services implies that many suppliants lacked prior knowledge of the ritual calendar, perhaps as a consequence of infrequent involvement with ritual activity. However, Scopasca suggests that it is likely there was still a "core" group of suppliants, which is perhaps to be identified with the same set of people to whom ownership of the temple belonged. According to the tablet, the grove was controlled by the individuals capable of allocating a tenth of their incomes towards the maintenance of the sanctuary, who themselves—according to Scopasca—probably constituted a small class of affluent individuals with sufficient wealth to meet the stipulated criterion.

Within the Agnone tablet, numerous other gods are mentioned with the accompanying adjective Kerríi ("of Ceres"). These deities are themselves often linked with agriculture or fertility, such as "fluusaí kerríiaí" ("She who flowers of Ceres") or "fuutreí kerríiaí" ("daughter of Ceres"). Another Oscan inscription from Capua mentions Ceres with the epithet Arentikai, perhaps meaning "avengeress," which may imply a connection between the underworld and Ceres, an association paralleled by Roman concepts such as the mundus Cerialis. In a Paelignian inscription, a deity named Anaceta Ceria is mentioned, who may be identified with the Roman goddess Angerona, herself associated with childbirth. Otherwise, in Paelignian culture, Ceres was possibly connected with agriculture, as another inscription mentions a "Cerfum sacracirix semunu," which perhaps means "priestess of the Cereres and the divinities of sowing." It is unclear whether the plural form Cereres consists of both Ceres and her daughter Proserpina or perhaps Venus and Ceres, who are known from another inscription to have been worshipped together by another Paelignian priesthood. However, the philologist Michael Weiss notes that, during the development of Paelignian, the Proto-Italic sequence *-res- was syncopated into *-rs-, before transforming into *-rr-. Such a sound change is attested for the Paelignian term cerria, itself from Proto-Italic *keresjos, therefore contradicting the supposed etymological relationship between Cerfum and Ceres. Weiss concedes that the unusual development of Cerfum may be explained if it was borrowed from another Italic language, perhaps South Picene, which itself possibly allowed for a different treatment of the cluster *-rs-.

=== Archaic and Regal eras ===
Roman tradition credited Ceres's eponymous festival, Cerealia, to Rome's second king, the semi-legendary Numa. Ceres's senior, male priesthood was a minor flaminate whose establishment and rites were supposedly also innovations of Numa. Her affinity and joint cult with Tellus, also known as Terra Mater (Mother Earth) may have developed at this time. Much later, during the early Imperial era, Ovid describes these goddesses as "partners in labour"; Ceres provides the "cause" for the growth of crops, while Tellus provides them a place to grow. The earliest known mention of Ceres is in a Faliscan inscription dated to around 600 BCE, wherein a request to "let Ceres give grain" is invoked.

=== Republican era ===
==== Ceres and the Aventine Triad ====
In 496 BC, against a background of economic recession and famine in Rome, imminent war against the Latins and a threatened secession by Rome's plebs (citizen commoners), the dictator A. Postumius vowed a temple to Ceres, Liber and Libera on or near the Aventine Hill. The famine ended and Rome's plebeian citizen-soldiery co-operated in the conquest of the Latins. Postumius's vow was fulfilled in 493 BC: Ceres became the central deity of the new Triad, housed in a new-built Aventine temple. She was also – or became – the patron goddess of the plebs, whose enterprise as tenant farmers, estate managers, agricultural factors and importers was a mainstay of Roman agriculture.

Much of Rome's grain was imported from territories of Magna Graecia, particularly from Sicily, which later Roman mythographers describe as Ceres's "earthly home". Writers of the late Roman Republic and early Empire describe Ceres's Aventine temple and rites as conspicuously Greek. In modern scholarship, this is taken as further evidence of long-standing connections between the plebeians, Ceres and Magna Graecia. It also raises unanswered questions on the nature, history and character of these associations: the Triad itself may have been a self-consciously Roman cult formulation based on Greco-Italic precedents. When a new form of Cerean cult was officially imported from Magna Graecia, it was known as the ritus graecus (Greek rite) of Ceres, and was distinct from her older Roman rites.

The older forms of Aventine rites to Ceres remain uncertain. Most Roman cults were led by men, and the officiant's head was covered by a fold of his toga. In the Roman ritus graecus, a male celebrant wore Greek-style vestments, and remained bareheaded before the deity, or else wore a wreath. While Ceres's original Aventine cult was led by male priests, her "Greek rites" (ritus graecus Cereris) were exclusively female.

=== Middle Republic ===
==== Ceres and Proserpina ====
Towards the end of the Second Punic War, around 205 BC, an officially recognised joint cult to Ceres and her daughter Proserpina was brought to Rome from southern Italy (Magna Graecia) along with Greek priestesses to serve it. In Rome, this was known as the ritus graecus Cereris; its priestesses were granted Roman citizenship so that they could pray to the gods "with a foreign and external knowledge, but with a domestic and civil intention"; the recruitment of respectable matrons seems to acknowledge the civic value of the cult. It was based on ancient, ethnically Greek cults to Demeter, most notably the Thesmophoria to Demeter and Persephone, whose cults and myths also provided a basis for the Eleusinian Mysteries.

From the end of the 3rd century BC, Demeter's temple at Enna, in Sicily, was acknowledged as Ceres's oldest, most authoritative cult centre, and Libera was recognised as Proserpina, Roman equivalent to Demeter's daughter Persephone. Their joint cult recalls Demeter's search for Persephone, after the latter's abduction into the underworld by Hades. The new, women-only cult to "mother and maiden" took its place alongside the old; it made no reference to Liber. Thereafter, Ceres was offered two separate and distinctive forms of official cult at the Aventine. Both might have been supervised by the male flamen Cerialis but otherwise, their relationship is unclear. The older form of cult included both men and women, and probably remained a focus for plebeian political identity and discontent. The new form identified its exclusively female initiates and priestesses as upholders of Rome's traditional, patrician-dominated social hierarchy and morality.

==== Ceres and Magna Mater ====
A year after the importation of the ritus cereris, patrician senators imported cult to the Greek goddess Cybele and established her as Magna Mater (The Great Mother) within Rome's sacred boundary, facing the Aventine Hill. Like Ceres, Cybele was a form of Graeco-Roman earth goddess. Unlike her, she had mythological ties to Troy, and thus to the Trojan prince Aeneas, mythological ancestor of Rome's founding father and first patrician Romulus. The establishment of official Roman cult to Magna Mater coincided with the start of a new saeculum (cycle of years). It was followed by Hannibal's defeat, the end of the Second Punic War and an exceptionally good harvest. Roman victory and recovery could therefore be credited to Magna Mater and patrician piety: so the patricians dined her and each other at her festival banquets. In similar fashion, the plebeian nobility underlined their claims to Ceres. Up to a point, the two cults reflected a social and political divide, but when certain prodigies were interpreted as evidence of Ceres's displeasure, the senate appeased her with a new festival, the ieiunium Cereris ("fast of Ceres").

In 133 BC, the plebeian noble and tribune Tiberius Gracchus bypassed the Senate and appealed directly to the popular assembly to pass his proposed land-reforms. Civil unrest spilled into violence; Gracchus and many of his supporters were murdered by their conservative opponents. At the behest of the Sibylline oracle, the senate sent the quindecimviri to Ceres's ancient cult centre at Henna in Sicily, the goddess' supposed place of origin and earthly home. Some kind of religious consultation or propitiation was given, either to expiate Gracchus's murder – as later Roman sources would claim – or to justify it as the lawful killing of a would-be king or demagogue, a homo sacer who had offended Ceres's laws against tyranny.

=== Late Republic ===
The Eleusinian Mysteries became increasingly popular during the late Republic. Early Roman initiates at Eleusis in Greece included Sulla and Cicero; thereafter many Emperors were initiated, including Hadrian, who founded an Eleusinian cult centre in Rome itself. In Late Republican politics, aristocratic traditionalists and popularists used coinage to propagate their competing claims to Ceres's favour. A coin of Sulla shows Ceres on one side, and on the other a ploughman with yoked oxen: the images, accompanied by the legend "conditor" ("he who stores the grain") claim his rule (a military dictatorship) as regenerative and divinely justified. Popularists used her name and attributes to appeal their guardianship of plebeian interests, particularly the annona and frumentarium; and plebeian nobles and aediles used them to point out their ancestral connections with plebeians as commoners. In the decades of Civil War that ushered in the Empire, such images and dedications proliferate on Rome's coinage: Julius Caesar, his opponents, his assassins and his heirs alike claimed the favour and support of Ceres and her plebeian proteges, with coin issues that celebrate Ceres, Libertas (liberty) and Victoria (victory).

=== Imperial era ===
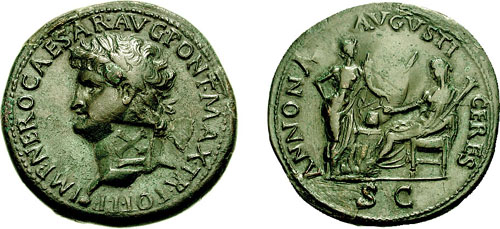
Emperors claimed a partnership with Ceres in grain provision, as in this sestertius of 66 AD. Left: Nero, garlanded. Right: Annona stands with cornucopiae (horns of Plenty); enthroned Ceres holds grain-ears and torch; between is a modius (grain measure) on a garlanded altar; in the background is a ship's stern.

Imperial theology conscripted Rome's traditional cults as the divine upholders of Imperial Pax (peace) and prosperity, for the benefit of all. The emperor Augustus began the restoration of Ceres's Aventine Temple; his successor Tiberius completed it. Of the several figures on the Augustan Ara Pacis, one doubles as a portrait of the Empress Livia, who wears Ceres's corona spicea. Another has been variously identified in modern scholarship as Tellus, Venus, Pax or Ceres, or in Spaeth's analysis, a deliberately broad composite of them all.

The emperor Claudius's reformed the grain supply and created its embodiment as an Imperial goddess, Annona, a junior partner to Ceres and the Imperial family. The traditional, Cerean virtues of provision and nourishment were symbolically extended to Imperial family members; some coinage shows Claudius's mother Antonia as an Augusta, wearing the corona spicea.

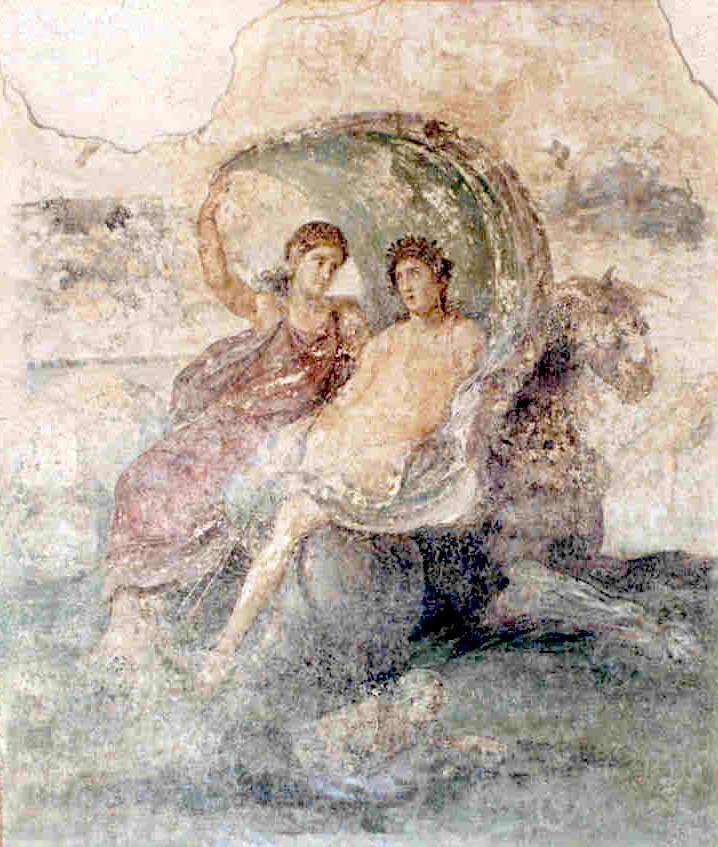
Fresco from Villa Carmiano, Stabiae, 1st century. Nude Greco-Roman deity Bacchus (right), god of wine, freedom and male fertility, identified with Greek Dionysus and Rome's native Liber. Ceres (left) is usually identified as his mother

The relationship between the reigning emperor, empress and Ceres was formalised in titles such as Augusta mater agrorum ("The august mother of the fields") and Ceres Augusta. On coinage, various emperors and empresses wear her corona spicea, showing that the goddess, the emperor and his spouse are conjointly responsible for agricultural prosperity and the all-important provision of grain. A coin of Nerva (reigned AD 96–98) acknowledges Rome's dependence on the princeps' gift of frumentio (corn dole) to the masses. Under Nerva's later dynastic successor Antoninus Pius, Imperial theology represents the death and apotheosis of the Empress Faustina the Elder as Ceres's return to Olympus by Jupiter's command. Even then, "her care for mankind continues and the world can rejoice in the warmth of her daughter Proserpina: in Imperial flesh, Proserpina is Faustina the Younger", empress-wife of Pius's successor Marcus Aurelius.

In Britain, a soldier's inscription of the 2nd century AD attests to Ceres's role in the popular syncretism of the times. She is "the bearer of ears of corn", the "Syrian Goddess", identical with the universal heavenly Mother, the Magna Mater and Virgo, virgin mother of the gods. She is peace and virtue, and inventor of justice: she weighs "Life and Right" in her scale.

During the Late Imperial era, Ceres gradually "slips into obscurity"; the last known official association of the Imperial family with her symbols is a coin issue of Septimius Severus (AD 193–211), showing his empress, Julia Domna, in the corona spicea. After the reign of Claudius Gothicus, no coinage shows Ceres's image. Even so, an initiate of her mysteries is attested in the 5th century AD, after the official abolition of all non-Christian cults.

== Legacy ==
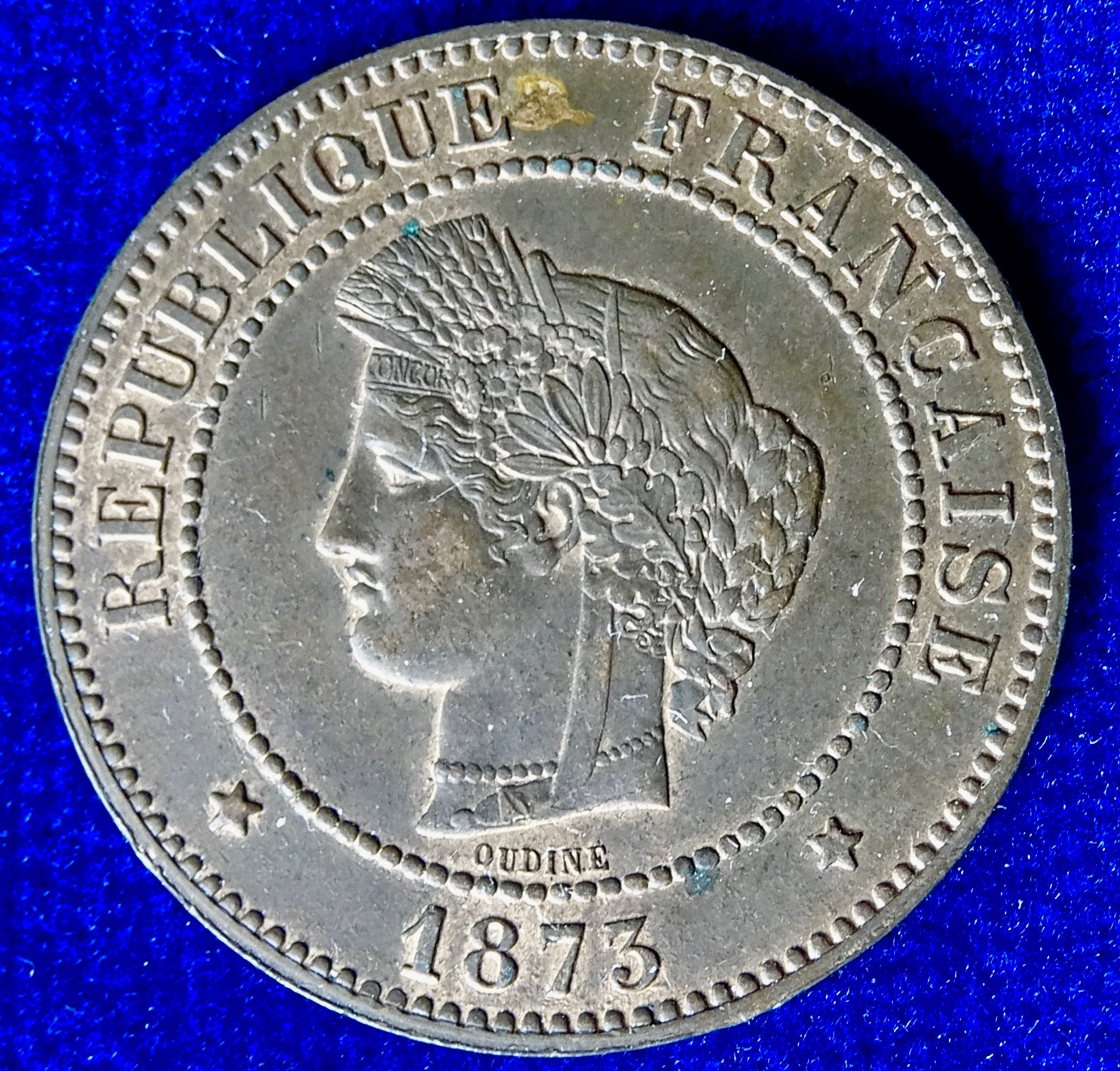
Ceres by Eugène-André Oudiné on a French coin of 1873 (3rd Republic).

The word cereal derives from Ceres's association with edible grains. Whereas Ceres represents food, her son Liber (later indistinguishable from Bacchus) represents wine and "good living". The Roman comedian Terence (c. 195/185 – c. 159 BC) uses the line sine Cerere et Baccho friget Venus which at its simplest translates as "without food and drink, love freezes" or "love needs food and wine to thrive" - probably proverbial and widespread in his own day. It was adopted variously as a brewer's motto, celebration, warning, and a subject of art in Renaissance Europe, especially the north and the Dutch Republic. Ceres represented the grains that produced beer through the brewing process. Imagery that represented the profitable business of commercial brewing showed the grain-goddess as a respectable matron and Liber-Bacchus as a gentleman; a wholesome picture of moral sobriety and restraint.

Ceres is featured both as a goddess and Queen of Sicilly in De Mulieribus Claris, a collection of biographies of historical and mythological women by the Florentine author Giovanni Boccaccio, composed in 1361–62 and notable as the first collection devoted exclusively to biographies of women in Western literature.

Ceres appears briefly to bless the wedding of Ferdinand and Miranda, in a masque at the ending of William Shakespeare's play The Tempest (1611).

In 1801, a newly discovered dwarf planet or asteroid was named after her. Two years later, the newly discovered element Cerium was named after the dwarf planet.

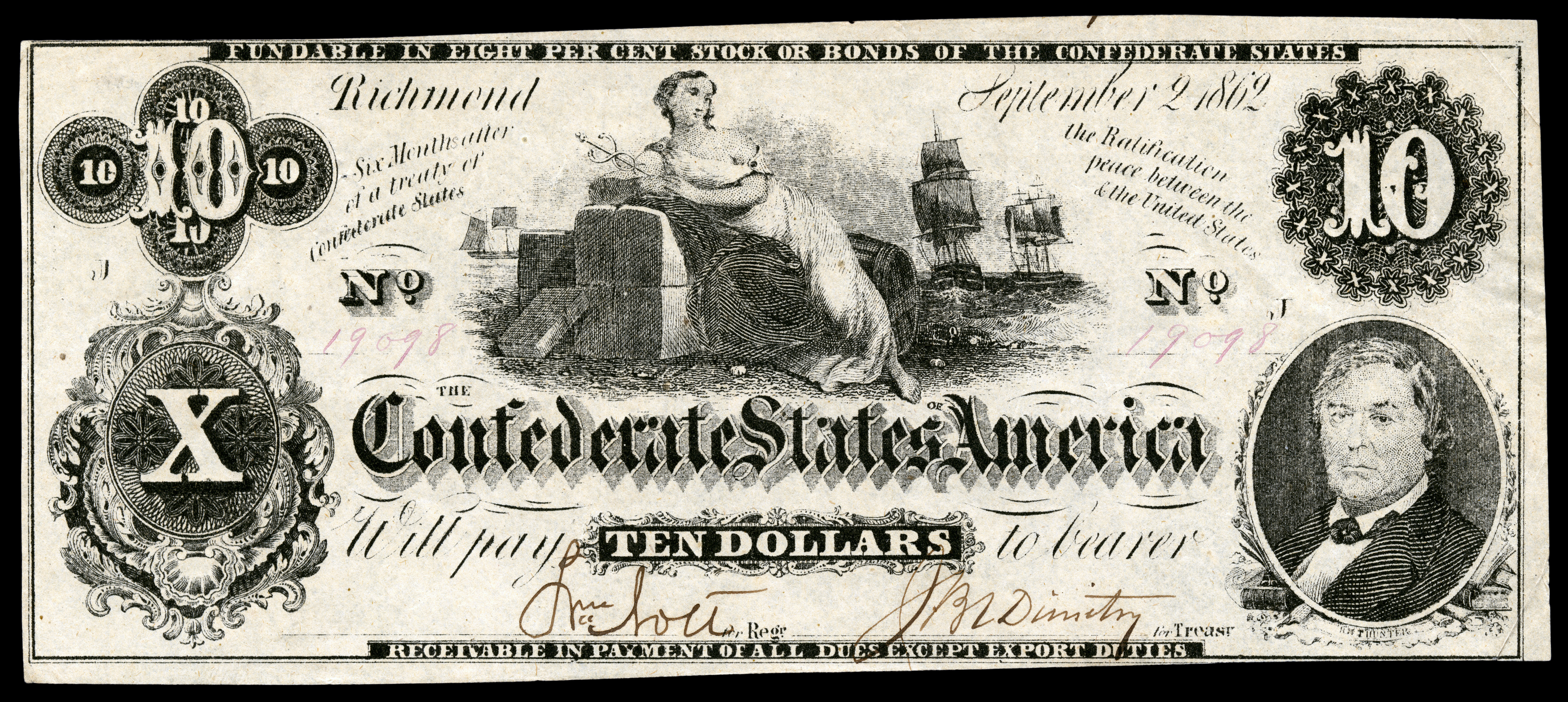
In the US, Ceres appears on several CSA banknotes. On this $10 note she reclines on a cotton bale holding a caduceus. Cropped image from National Numismatic Collection, National Museum of American History.

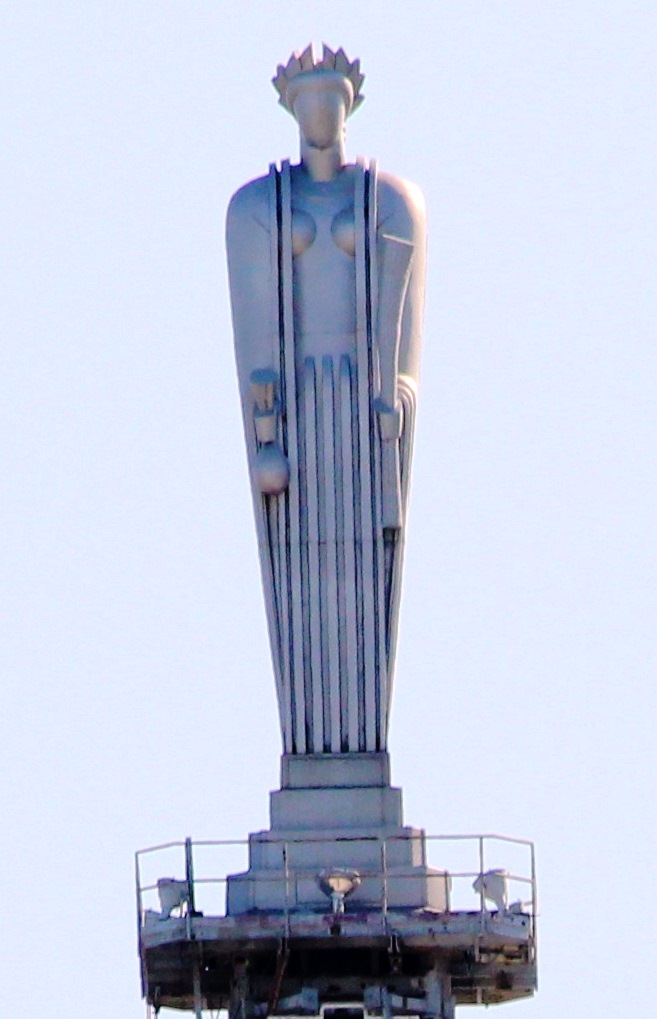
The 3-storey faceless depiction of Ceres atop the Chicago Board of Trade Building.

An aria in praise of Ceres is sung in Act 4 of the opera The Trojans (first performance 1863) by Hector Berlioz.

A misanthropic poem recited by Dmitri in Dostoevsky's 1880 novel The Brothers Karamazov, (part 1, Book 3, chapter 3) reflects on Ceres's heartbroken search for her lost daughter, and her encounter with the worst and most degraded of humanity.

In the United States, Ceres is one of the three "goddess offices" held in The National Grange of the Order of Patrons of Husbandry. She is depicted on the Seal of New Jersey. Statues of her top the Missouri State Capitol, the Vermont State House, and the Chicago Board of Trade Building, all of which have historical links with agriculture and agricultural trade.

== See also ==
- Corn mother
- Annapurna
- Consus
- Dewi Sri
- Huminodun
- Po Sop
