= Supplicatio =

Roman public prayer

In ancient Roman religion, a supplicatio is a day of public prayer during times of crisis or a thanksgiving for receipt of aid. During days of public prayer, Roman men, women, and children traveled in procession to religious sites around the city praying for divine aid. Supplications might also be ordered in response to prodigies (prodigia); participants wore wreaths, carried laurel twigs, and attended sacrifices at temple precincts throughout the city.

Supplicatio as a form of religious expression is distinct in meaning from the general English definition of supplication as an act of beseeching following a military defeat or surrender, for which the Latin word submissio was more commonly used.

== Usage ==
It was usually decreed as soon as official intelligence of the victory had been received by a letter from the general in command. The number of days during which it was to last was proportioned to the importance of the victory. There are mentions of thanksgivings for forty days, fifty days and even sixty.

Sometimes it was decreed for only one day but more commonly for three or five days. A supplication of ten days was first decreed in honour of Pompey at the conclusion of the war with Mithridates and one of fifteen days after the victory over the Belgae by Caesar, an honour which Caesar himself says had never been granted to any one before.

Subsequently, a supplicatio of twenty days was decreed after his defeat of Vercingetorix. From this time the senate seems to have frequently increased the number of days out of mere compliment to the general.

A supplicatio was usually regarded as a prelude to a triumph but it was not always followed by one, as Cato reminds Cicero, to whose honour a supplicatio had been decreed. This honour was conferred upon Cicero on account of his suppression of the conspiracy of Catiline, which had never been decreed to any one before in a civil capacity (togatus) as he frequently takes occasion to mention.

A supplicatio, a solemn supplication and humiliation, was also decreed in times of public danger and distress and on account of prodigies to avert the anger of the gods.
