= Quintilis =

Month of the ancient Roman calendar

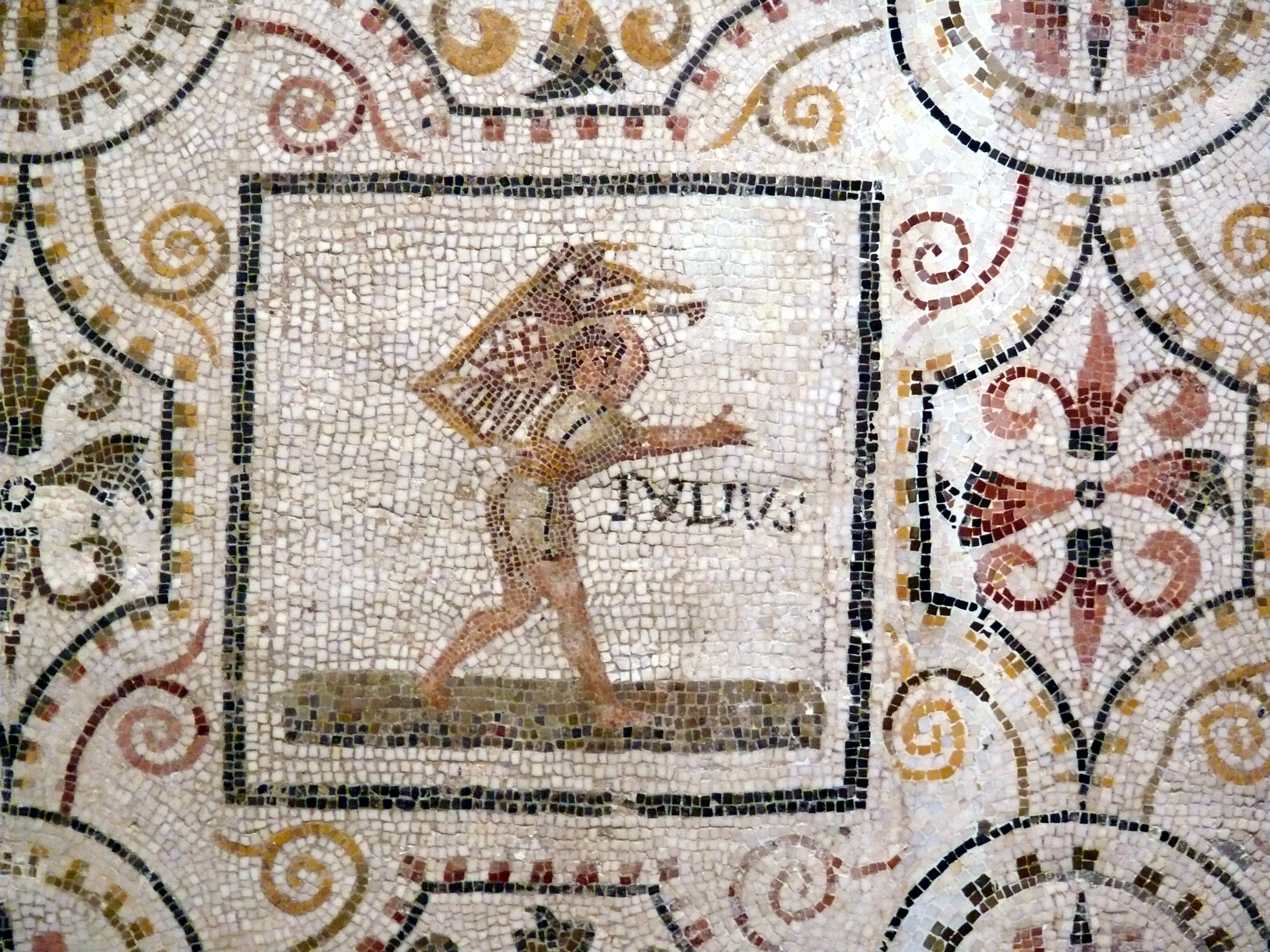
July panel from a Roman mosaic of the months (from El Djem, Tunisia, first half of 3rd century AD)

In the ancient Roman calendar, Quintilis or Quinctilis was the month following Junius (June) and preceding Sextilis (August). Quintilis is Latin for "fifth": it was the fifth month (quintilis mensis) in the earliest calendar attributed to Romulus, which began with Martius ("Mars' month," March) and had 10 months. After the calendar reform that produced a 12-month year, Quintilis became the seventh month, but retained its name. In 45 BC, Julius Caesar instituted a new calendar (the Julian calendar) that corrected astronomical discrepancies in the old. After his death in 44 BC, the month of Quintilis, his birth month, was renamed Julius in his honor, hence July. Like the modern month of July, this was one of the "long" months that had 31 days.

Quintilis was under the guardianship (tutela) of the Romans' supreme deity Jupiter, with sacrifices made particularly to Neptune and Apollo. Agricultural festivals directed at the harvest gradually lost their importance, and the month became dominated in urban Imperial Rome by the Ludi Apollinares, games (ludi) in honor of Apollo. Ten days of games were celebrated in honor of Julius Caesar at the end of the month.

== Dates ==
The Romans did not number days of a month sequentially from the 1st through the last day. Instead, they counted back from the three fixed points of the month: the Nones (Nonae, 5th or 7th, depending on the length of the month), the Ides (Idūs, 13th or 15th), and the Kalends (Kalendae, 1st) of the following month. Thus, the last day of Quintilis was the pridie Kalendas Sextilis, "day before the Kalends of Sextilis" (August). Roman counting was inclusive; July 5 was ante diem III Nonas Quintilis, "the 3rd day before the Nones (7th) of Quintilis," usually abbreviated a.d. III Non. Quint. (or with the a.d. omitted altogether); July 23 was X. Kal. Sext., "the 10th day before the Kalends of Sextilis."

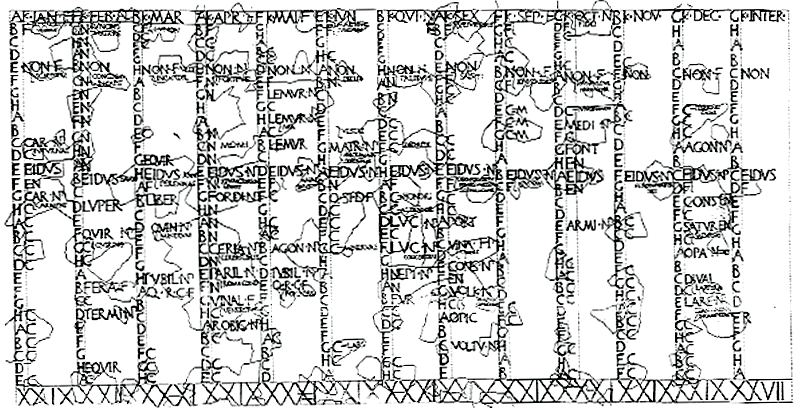
Drawing of the fragmentary Fasti Antiates, a pre-Julian calendar showing Quintilis (abbreviated QUI) at the top of the seventh column

Each day was marked with a letter such as F for dies fasti, days when it was legal to initiate action in the courts of civil law; C, for dies comitalis, a day on which the Roman people could hold assemblies (comitia), elections, and certain kinds of judicial proceedings; N for dies nefasti, when these political activities and the administration of justice were prohibited; or NP, the meaning of which remains elusive, but which marked feriae, public holidays. Days were also marked with nundinal letters in cycles of A B C D E F G H, to mark the "market week" A dies natalis was an anniversary such as a temple founding or rededication, sometimes thought of as the "birthday" of a deity. On a dies religiosus, individuals were not to undertake any new activity, nor do anything other than tend to the most basic necessities.

During the Imperial period, some of the traditional festivals localized at Rome became less important, and the birthdays and anniversaries of the emperor and his family gained prominence as Roman holidays. On the calendar of military religious observances known as the Feriale Duranum, sacrifices pertaining to Imperial cult outnumber the older festivals. After the latter 1st century AD, a number of dates are added to calendars for spectacles and games (ludi) held in honor of various deities in the venue called a "circus" (ludi circenses). By the late 2nd century AD, extant calendars no longer show days marked with letters (F, N, C and so on) to show their religious status, probably in part as a result of calendar reforms undertaken by Marcus Aurelius.

Unless otherwise noted, the dating and observances on the following table are from H.H. Scullard, Festivals and Ceremonies of the Roman Republic (Cornell University Press, 1981), pp. 158–169.

Modern date	Roman date	status	Observances
July 1	Kalendae Quintilis	N	• each Kalends was sacred to Juno, who received a sacrifice from the regina sacrorum • dies natalis of a temple to Felicitas
2	ante diem VI Nonas Quintilis	N	
3	V. Non. Quint.	N	
4	IV Non. Quint.	N	
5	III Non. Quint.	NP	• Poplifugia, the only major festival of the year celebrated before the Nones
6	Prid. Non. Quint.	N	• Ludi Apollinares begin • dies natalis of the Temple of Fortuna Muliebris
7	Nonae Quintilis	N	• Ludi Apollinares continue • dies natalis of the Temple of the Two Pales • Caprotinia • Feast of Serving Women (Ancillarum feriae)
8	VIII Id. Quint.	N dies religiosus	• Ludi Apollinares continue • Vitulatio
9	VII Id. Quint.	N	• Ludi Apollinares continue
10	VI Id. Quint.	C	• Ludi Apollinares continue
11	V Id. Quint.	C	• Ludi Apollinares continue
12	IV Id. Quint.	C	• Ludi Apollinares continue
13	III Id. Quint.	C	• Last day of the Ludi Apollinares, with a sacrifice at the Temple of Apollo in the Campus Martius
14	Prid. Id. Quint.	C	• Mercatus (market days) begin
15	Idus Quintilis	NP	• Mercatus (market day) • Equitum Romanorum probatio or transvectio, procession of the Roman knights
16	XVII Kal. Sext.	F	• Mercatus (market day)
17	XVI Kal. Sext.	C	• Mercatus (market day) • sacrifices to the deities Honor and Victory
18	XV Kal. Sext.	C dies religiosus	• Mercatus (market day) • anniversary of the Battle of the Allia (Dies Alliensis), a "black day" (dies ater)
19	XIV Kal. Sext.	NP	• Mercatus (market day) • Lucaria
20	XIII Kal. Sext.	C	• Ludi Victoriae Caesaris begin, held annually from 45 BC, after the month was renamed Julius
21	XII Kal. Sext.	NP	• second day of Lucaria • Ludi Victoriae Caesaris continue
22	XI Kal. Sext.	C	• dies natalis of the Temple of Concordia • Ludi Victoriae Caesaris continue
23	X Kal. Sext.	NP	• Neptunalia • Ludi Victoriae Caesaris continue
24	IX Kal. Sext.	N	• Ludi Victoriae Caesaris continue
25	VIII Kal. Sext.	NP	• Furrinalia • Ludi Victoriae Caesaris continue
26	VII Kal. Sext.	C	• Ludi Victoriae Caesaris continue
27	VI Kal. Sext.	C	• Ludi Victoriae Caesaris continue
28	V Kal. Sext.	C	• Ludi Victoriae Caesaris continue
29	IV Kal. Sext.	C	• Ludi Victoriae Caesaris continue
30	III Kal. Sext.	C	• dies natalis of the Temple of Fortuna Huiusce Diei (the "Fortune of This Day") • Ludi Victoriae Caesaris conclude
31	Prid. Kal. Sext.	C	

== See also ==
- Month names: Ianuarius, Februarius, Martius, Aprilis, Maius, Junius, Sextilis, September, October, November, December.
- Leap month: Mercedonius or Intercalaris.
