= Palus Caprae =

Goat's marsh - site in ancient Rome

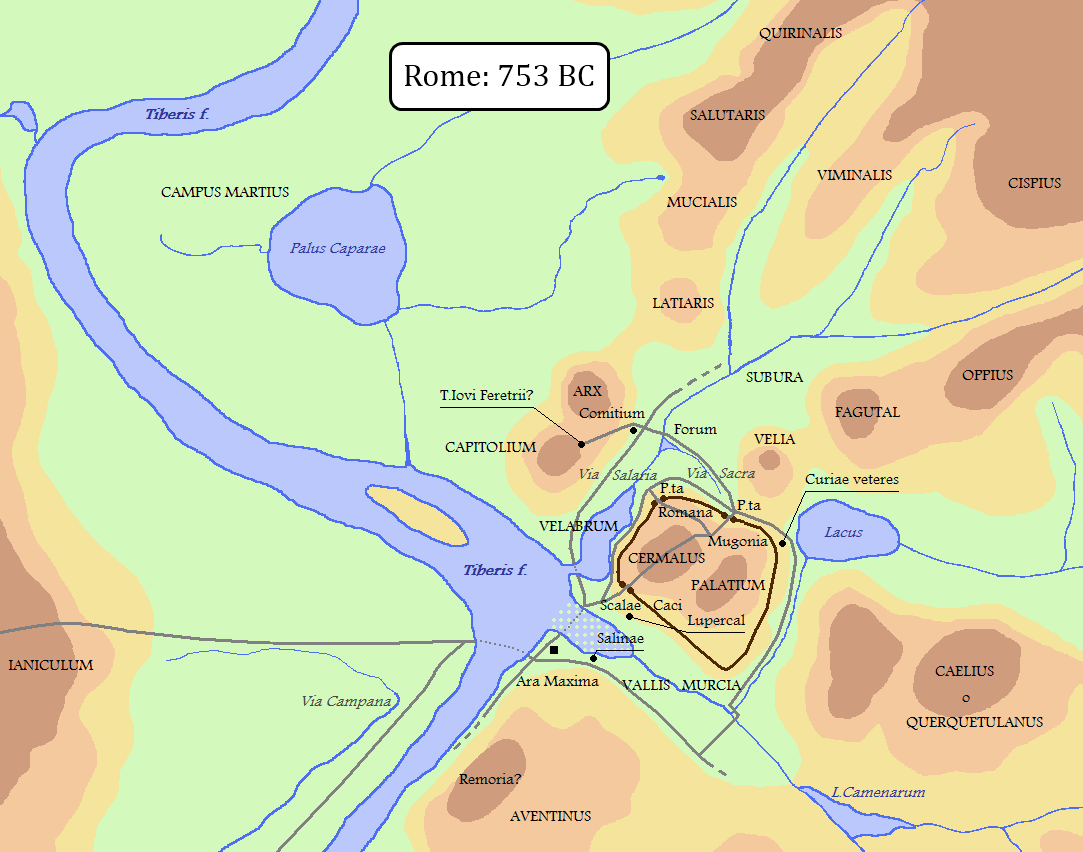
The Palus Caprae is the lake-like body of water at the centre of the top left of this speculative map of Rome in 753 BCE.

The Palus Caprae (or Capreae; meaning "Goat Marsh" or "the Goat's pool") was a site within the Campus Martius in Ancient Rome. In Roman mythology, the Palus Caprae was the place where Romulus underwent ascension into godhood.

== Description ==
The marsh was fed by a stream called Petronia Amnis, but by the Augustan period it had disappeared or been drained. The Palus Caprae was in the small basin where the Pantheon was later built, west of the Altar of Mars supposed to have been established by Numa Pompilius, Romulus's successor. Ludwig Preller thought it might be the same site as the Aedicula Capraria in Regio VI (Via Lata), as listed by the Regiones, and Filippo Coarelli conjectured that the mythic significance of the Palus Caprae was the reason for siting the Pantheon there.

== In myth ==
On the Nones of Quinctilis (July 7), Romulus was reviewing the army on the Campus Martius near the Palus Caprae. Suddenly a storm broke out, accompanied by a solar eclipse, and a deluge consumed the place. When it cleared and the terrified Romans reemerged from their places of refuge, their king was nowhere to be found.

Julius Proculus claimed that Romulus appeared to him in a dream and announced that he was henceforth to be known as the god Quirinus, because the gods had taken him up to live among them. Although Romulus is not said to have died, his tomb was supposed to be located on the Comitium under the Lapis Niger.

The occasion was commemorated ritually by the Nonae Caprotinae.
