= Furina =

Furina may refer to:

- Furina (snake), a genus of snakes
- Furina (Genshin Impact), a character from Genshin Impact

== See also ==
- Furrina
