= Aoussou =

Aoussou (Arabic: أوسو) is the period of the year extending, according to the Berber calendar, over 40 days from 25 July. It is known to be a very hot period.

== Event ==
In Tunisia, the Carnival of Aoussou is celebrated during this period, a festive and cultural event taking place in Sousse.
