= Neptune (mythology) =

Roman god of freshwater and the sea

- God of the Sea
- Member of the Dii Consentes
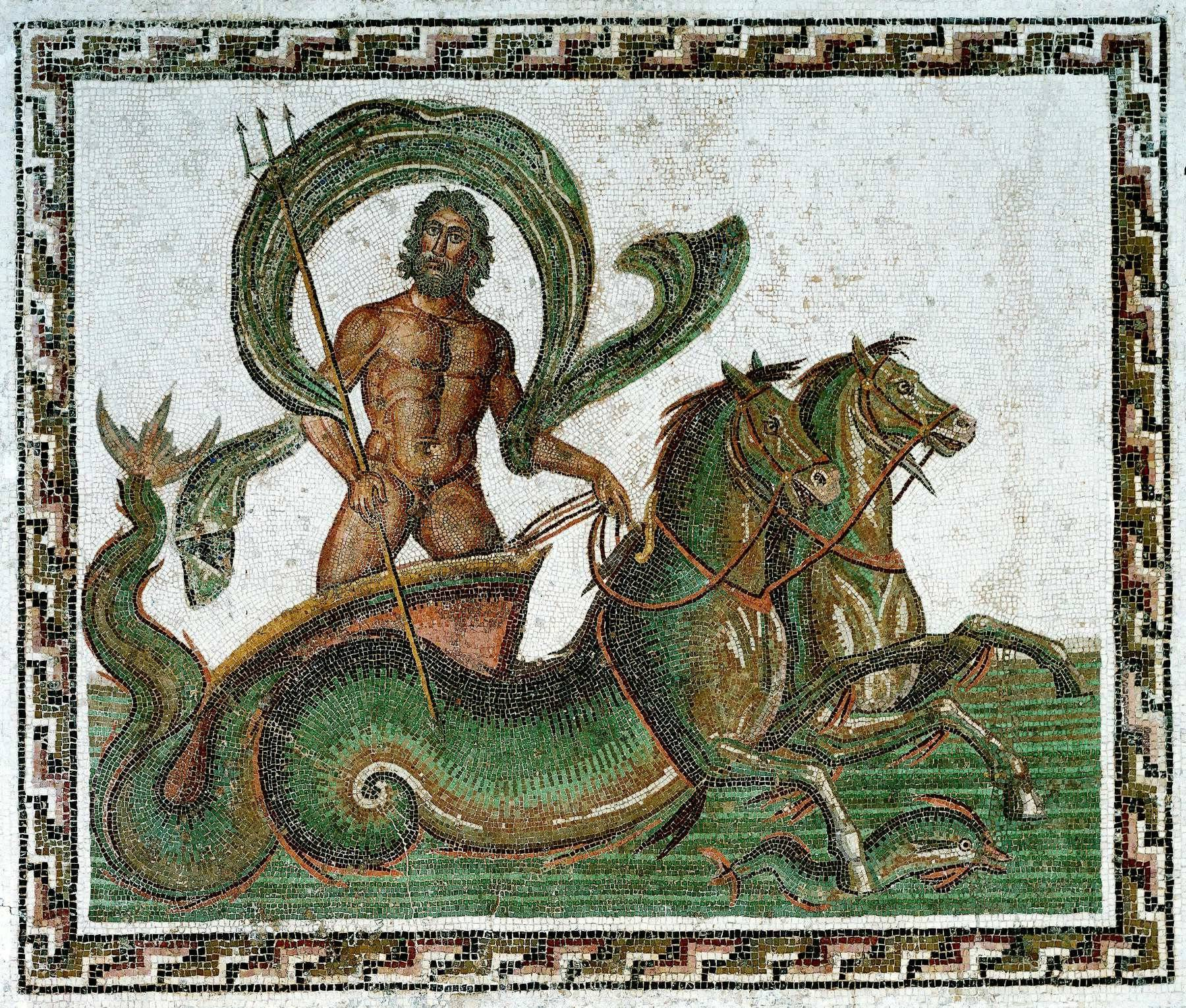
- A velificans of Neptune in his seahorse-drawn triumphal chariot from the mid-3rd century AD - Sousse Archaeological Museum
- Other names: Neptunus
- Abode: Sea
- Symbol: Horse, trident, dolphin
- Festivals: Neptunalia; Lectisternium

Genealogy
- Parents: Saturn and Ops
- Siblings: Jupiter, Pluto, Juno, Ceres, Vesta
- Consort: Salacia
- Children: Triton

Equivalents
- Etruscan: Nethuns
- Greek: Poseidon

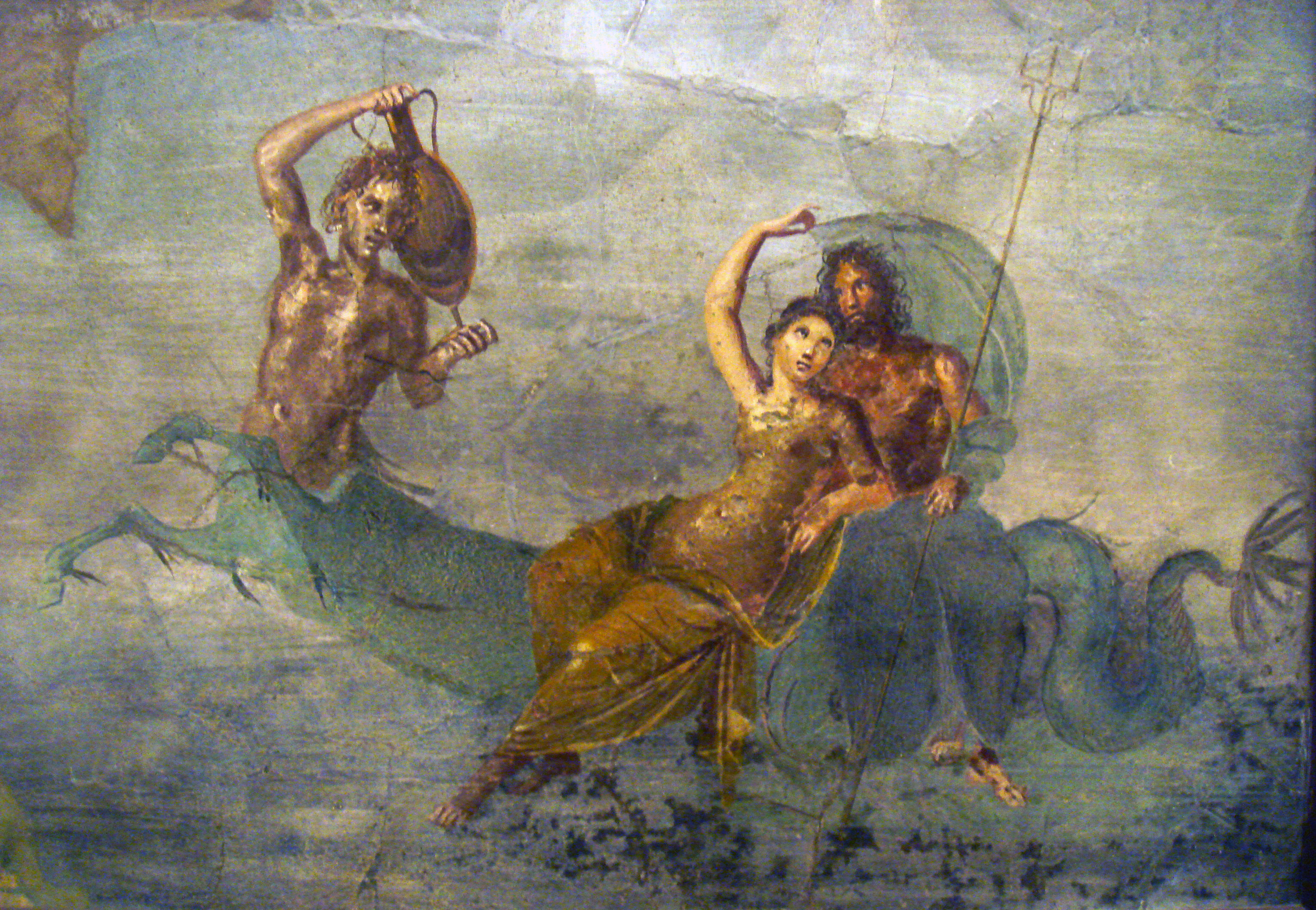
Ichthyocentaur, Salacia and Neptune, antique fresco from Pompeii, Italy

Neptune (Latin: Neptūnus [nɛpˈtuːnʊs]) is the god of freshwater and the sea in the Roman religion. He is the counterpart of the Greek god Poseidon. In the Greek-inspired tradition, he is a brother of Jupiter and Pluto, with whom he presides over the realms of heaven, the earthly world (including the underworld), and the seas. Salacia is his wife.

Depictions of Neptune in Roman mosaics, especially those in North Africa, were influenced by Hellenistic conventions. He was likely associated with freshwater springs before the sea; his festival, Neptunalia, took place on July 23, during the peak of summer when water was scarcest. Like Poseidon, he was also worshipped by the Romans as a god of horses, Neptunus equestris, who was also a patron of horse-racing.

== Worship ==
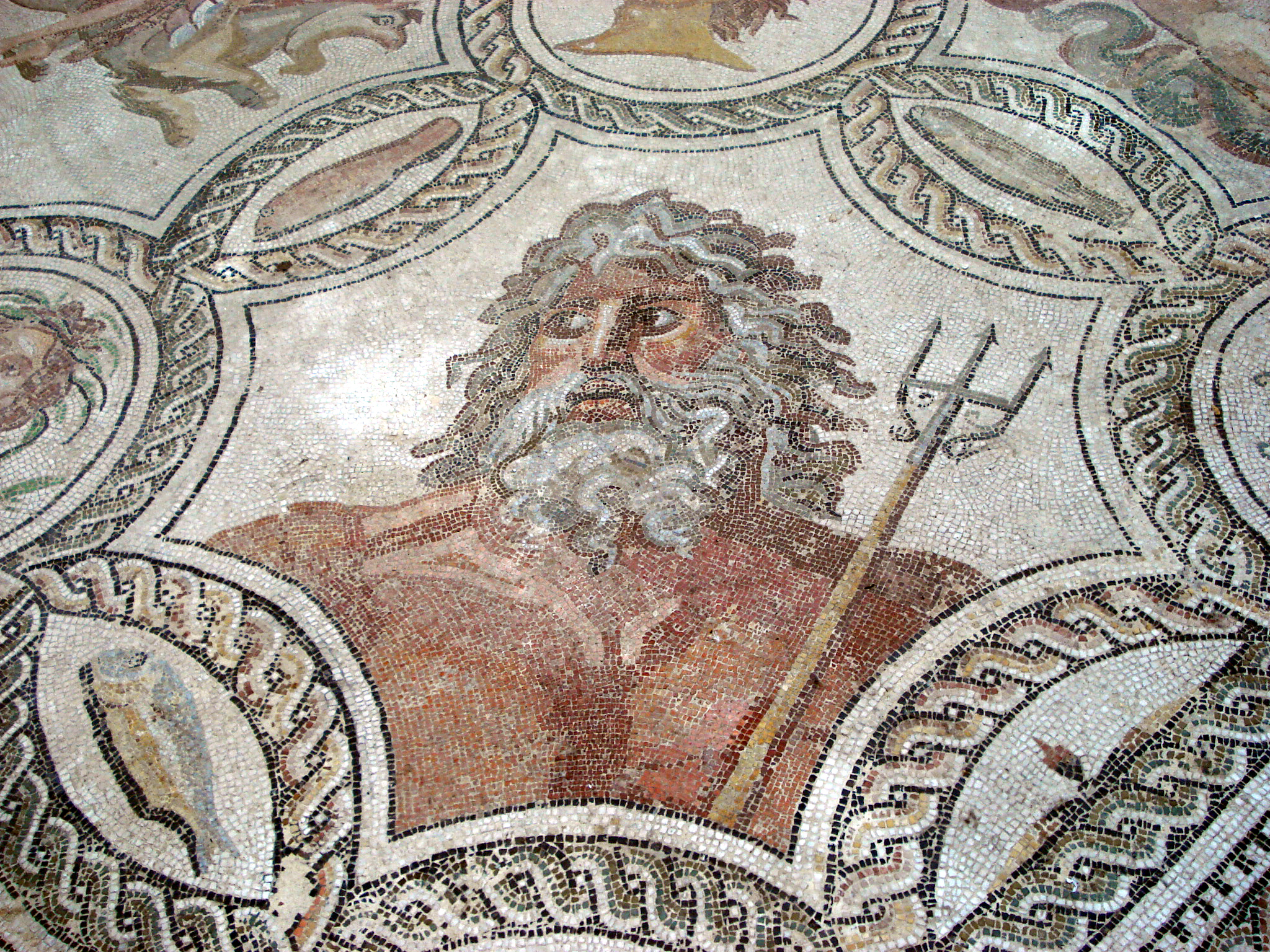
Mosaic of Neptune (Regional Archeological Museum Antonio Salinas, Palermo)

Roman mosaic on a wall in the House of Neptune and Amphitrite, Herculaneum, Italy

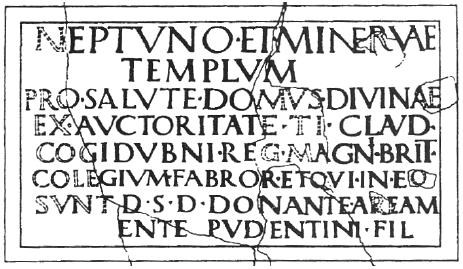
The Chichester inscription, which reads (in English): "To Neptune and Minerva, for the welfare of the Divine House, by the authority of Tiberius Claudius Cogidubnus, Great King in Britain, the college of artificers and those therein erected this temple from their own resources [...]ens, son of Pudentinus, donated the site."

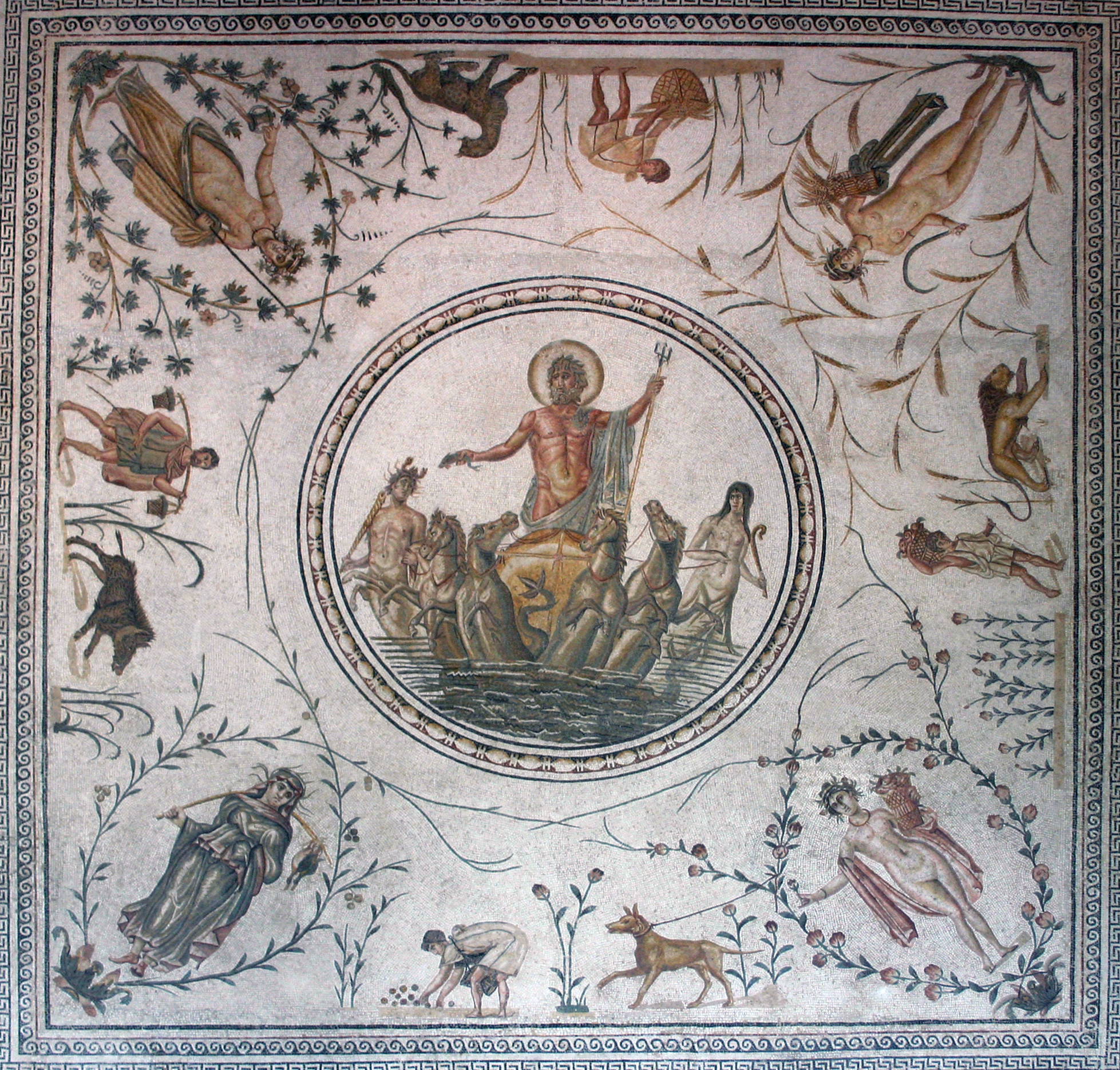
Triumph of Neptune, Roman mosaic with the seasons in each corner and agricultural scenes and flora (La Chebba, Tunisia, late 2nd century, Bardo National Museum)

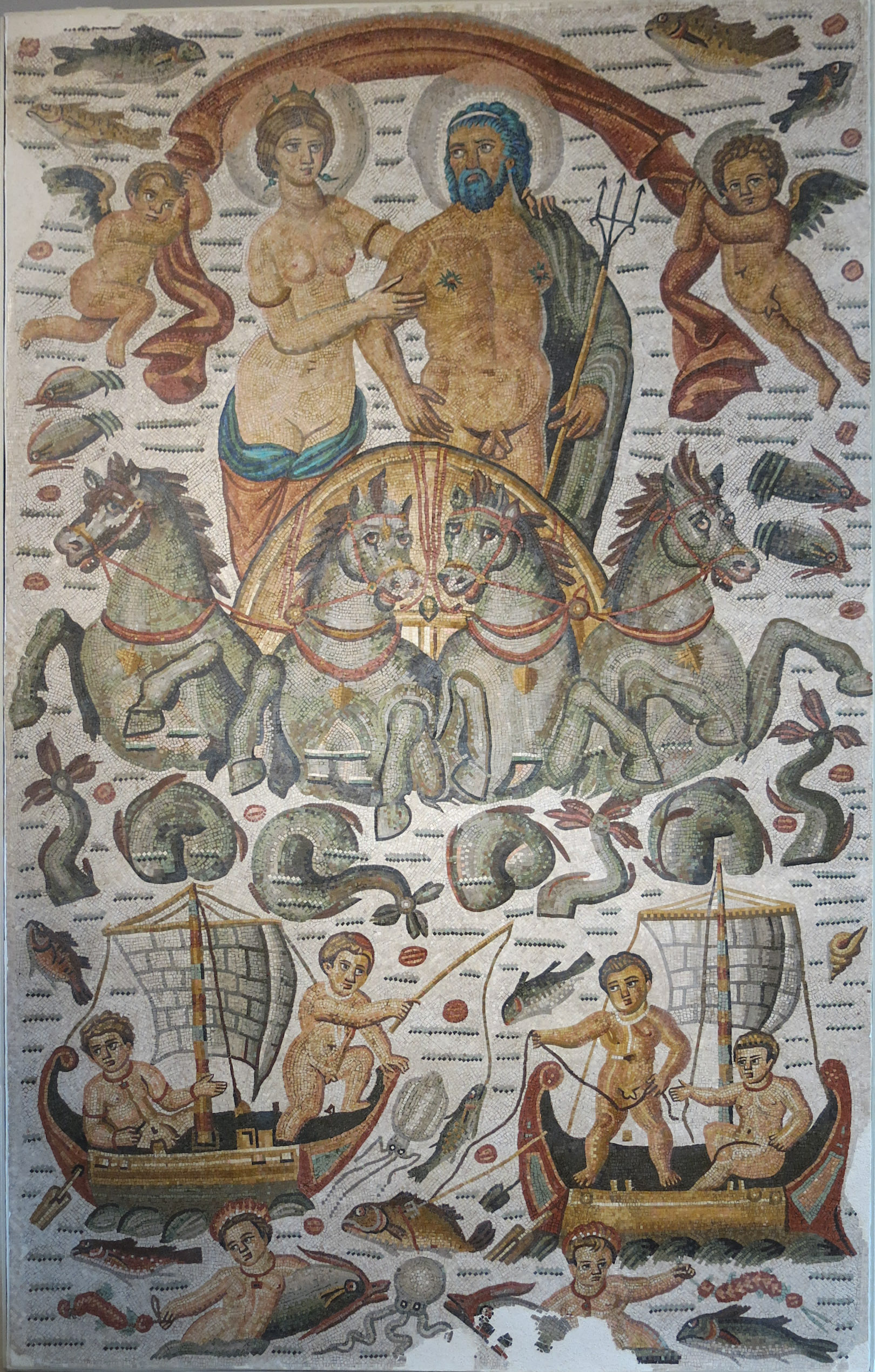
Triumph of Poseidon and Amphitrite, showing the couple in procession. Detail of a large Roman mosaic from Cirta, Roman Africa (c. 315–325 AD, now at the Louvre)

The theology of Neptune is limited by his close identification with the Greek god Poseidon, one of many members of the Greek pantheon whose theology was later tied to a Roman deity. The lectisternium of 399 BC indicated that the Greek figures of Poseidon, Artemis, and Heracles had been introduced and worshipped in Rome as Neptune, Diana, and Hercules. It has been speculated that Neptune has been conflated with a Proto-Indo-European freshwater deity; since the Indo-Europeans lived inland and had little direct knowledge of the sea, the Romans may have reused the theology of a previous freshwater god in their worship of Neptune. Servius explicitly names Neptune as the god of rivers, springs, and waters; he may parallel the Irish god Nechtan, master of rivers and wells. This is in contrast to Poseidon, who was primarily a god of the sea.

Neptune has been associated with a number of other Roman deities. By the first century BC, he had supplanted Portunus as the god of naval victories; Sextus Pompeius called himself the "son of Neptune". For a time, Neptune was paired in his dominion of the sea with Salacia, the goddess of saltwater. Neptune was considered the legendary progenitor god of the Falisci (who called themselves Neptunia proles), joining Mars, Janus, Saturn, and Jupiter as the deific father of a Latin tribe.

=== Neptunalia ===
Neptunalia, the Roman festival of Neptune, was held at the height of summer (typically on July 23). The date of the festival and the construction of tree-branch shelters suggest that Neptune was a god of water sources in times of drought and heat. The most ancient Roman calendar set the feriae of Neptunus on July 23, between the Lucaria festival of the grove and the Furrinalia festival of July 25. All three festivals were connected to water during the period of summer heat (canicula) and drought, when freshwater sources were lowest.

It has been speculated that the three festivals fall in a logical order. The Lucaria was devoted to clearing overgrown bushes and uprooting and burning excess vegetation. Neptunalia followed, devoted to conservation and the draining of superficial waters. These culminated in the Furrinalia, sacred to Furrina (the goddess of springs and wells).

Neptunalia was spent under branch huts in a woods between the Tiber and the Via Salaria, with participants drinking spring water and wine to escape the heat. It was a time of merrymaking, when men and women could mix without the usual Roman societal constraints. There is an added context of agricultural fertility in the festival, since Neptune received the sacrifice of a bull.

=== Temples ===
Neptune had only one temple in Rome, the Temple of Neptune. It stood near the Circus Flaminius, the Roman racetrack in the southern part of the Campus Martius, and dates back to at least 206 BC. The temple was restored out by Gnaeus Domitius Ahenobarbus c. 40 BC, an event depicted on a coin struck by the consul. Within the temple was a sculpture of a marine group by Scopas Minor. The Basilica Neptuni was later built on the Campus Martius, and was dedicated by Agrippa in honor of the naval victory of Actium. This basilica supplanted the older temple, which had replaced an ancient altar.

=== Sacrifices ===
Neptune is one of only four Roman gods to whom it was considered appropriate to sacrifice a bull. The other three were Apollo, Mars, and Jupiter, although Vulcan (known in Greek mythology as Hephaestus) has also been depicted with the offering of a red bull and a red-bull calf. If an incorrect offering was presented, either inadvertently or due to necessity, additional propitiation was required to avoid divine retribution. This type of offering implied a stricter connection between the deity and the world.

=== Paredrae ===
Paredrae are entities who accompany a god, representing the fundamental aspects (or powers) of that god. With Hellenic influence, these paredrae came to be considered separate deities and consorts of their associated god. Earlier folk belief might have also identified paredrae as consorts of their god.

Salacia and Venilia have been discussed by ancient and modern scholars. Varro connects Salacia to salum (sea), and Venilia to ventus (wind). Festus attributed to Salacia the motion of the sea. Venilia brought waves to the shore, and Salacia caused their retreat out to sea. They were examined by the Christian philosopher St. Augustine, who devoted a chapter of De Civitate Dei to ridiculing inconsistencies in the theological definition of the entities; since Salacia personified the deep sea, Augustine wondered how she could also be the retreating waves (since waves are a surface phenomenon). He wrote elsewhere that Venilia would be the "hope that comes", an aspect (or power) of Jupiter understood as anima mundi.

Servius, in his commentary on the Aeneid, wrote about Salacia and Venilia in V 724: "(Venus) dicitur et Salacia, quae proprie meretricum dea appellata est a veteribus"; "(Venus) is also called Salacia, who was particularly named goddess of prostitutes by the ancient". Elsewhere, he wrote that Salacia and Venilia are the same entity.

Among modern scholars, Dumézil and his followers Bloch and Schilling centre their interpretation of Neptune on the direct, concrete, limited value and functions of water. Salacia would represent the forceful, violent aspect of gushing and overflowing water and Venilia the tranquil, gentle aspect of still (or slowly-flowing) water. According to Dumézil, Neptune's two paredrae (Salacia and Venilia) represent the overpowering and tranquil aspects of water, natural and domesticated: Salacia the gushing, overbearing waters, and Venilia the still (or quietly-flowing) waters.

Preller, Fowler, Petersmann and Takács attribute to the theology of Neptune broader significance as a god of universal worldly fertility, particularly relevant to agriculture and human reproduction. They interpret Salacia as personifying lust, and Venilia as related to venia: ingratiating attraction, connected with love and the desire for reproduction. Ludwig Preller cited a significant aspect of Venilia; she was recorded in the indigitamenta as a deity of longing or desire. According to Preller, this would explain a theonym similar to that of Venus. Other data seem to agree; Salacia would parallel Thetis as the mother of Achilles, and Venilia would be the mother of Turnus and Iuturna by Daunus (king of the Rutulians). According to another source, Venilia would be the partner of Janus, with whom she mothered the nymph Canens (loved by Picus). These mythical data underline the reproductive function envisaged in the figures of Neptune's paredrae, particularly that of Venilia, in childbirth and motherhood. A legendary king Venulus was remembered at Tibur and Lavinium.

== Neptunus equestris ==
Before Poseidon was known as the god of the sea, he was connected to the horse and may have originally been depicted in equine form. This connection reflects the violent and brutal nature of Poseidon the earth-shaker, the linkage of horses and springs, and the animal's psychopompous character. Neptune, in contrast, has no such direct connection with horses. The Roman deity Consus was associated with the horse, and his underground altar was in the valley of the Circus Maximus at the foot of the Palatine (the site of horse races). On the summer Consualia (August 21) it was customary to bring horses and mules, crowned with flowers, in procession and then hold equine races in the Circus. The festival also traditionally reenacted the abduction of the Sabine (and Latin) women, reflecting the sexual license characteristic of such festivals. On that day, the Flamen Quirinalis and the Vestal Virgins made sacrifices on the underground altar of Consus. The proximity of the two Consualia to the Opiconsivia (the latter were four days later, the winter festival on December 19) indicates the relationship between the two deities pertaining to agriculture. According to Dumézil, the horse has a much-different symbolic value in the theologies of Poseidon and Consus. Tertullian (De Spectaculis V 7) wrote that according to Roman tradition, Consus was the god who advised Romulus on the abduction of the Sabines.

Perhaps influenced by Poseidon Ίππιος, Consus (whose festival included horse races) was reinterpreted as Neptunus equestris; for his underground altar, he was identified with Poseidon Ένοσίχθων. The etymology of Poseidon, derived from Posis (lord or husband) and De (grain or earth) may have contributed to the identification of Consus with Neptune. His arcane cult, which required the unearthing of the altar, indicate the deity's antiquity and chthonic nature. From Augustine (De Civitate Dei IV 8, about the role of Tutilina in assuring the safety of stored grain), Dumézil interprets its name as deriving from condere (to hide or store) as a verbal noun similar to Sancus and Janus: the god of stored grains. A direct identification of Consus with Poseidon is hindered by the fact that Poseidon is nowhere worshipped at underground shrines or altars.

Martianus Capella places Neptune and Consus together in region X of Heaven, possibly following an old interpretatio graeca of Consus or reflecting an Etruscan idea of a chthonic Neptune apparent in the recommendation of the De Haruspicum Responso for propitiating Neptune for the cracking sounds heard underground in the ager latiniensis. The Etruscans were also fond of horse races.

== Etruria ==
The Etruscan name of Neptune is Nethuns. It had been believed that Neptune derived from Etruscan, but this view has been disputed. Nethuns was apparently important to the Etruscans. His name is found in two places on the Liver of Piacenza: on the outer rim of section seven, and on the gallbladder of section 28. This last location aligns with Pliny the Elder's belief that the gallbladder was sacred to Neptune. The name Nethuns occurs eight times in columns VII, IX, and XI of the Liber Linteus.

On a mirror from Tuscania (E. S. 1. 76), Nethuns is represented talking to Uśil (the sun) and Thesan (the goddess of dawn). Nethuns is seated on the left, holding a double-ended trident in his right hand and with his left arm raised as if giving instructions. Uśil is standing in the centre, holding Aplu's bow in his right hand. Thesan is on the right, with her right hand on Uśil's shoulder; both are listening intently to Nethuns' words. The identification of Uśil with Aplu (and his association with Nethuns) is emphasised by an anguiped demon holding two dolphins on an exergue. The scene highlights the identities and association of Nethuns and Aplu (here identified as Uśil) as main deities of the worldly realm and the life cycle. Thesan and Uśil-Aplu, who has been identified with Śuri (Soranus Pater, the underworld sun god) clarify the transience of earthly life.

Neptune is a god of fertility, including human fertility. According to Stephen Weinstock, Jupiter is present in each of the first three regions with different aspects related to each region; Neptune should have been in the second region, and Pluto in the third. The reason for Neptune's displacement to region X is unclear. It is consistent with the collocation in the third quadrant of the deities related to the human world.

=== Etruscan Penates ===
Arnobius provides information about the theology of Neptune. Neptune and Apollo were considered Etruscan Penates, and the deities were credited with giving Ilium its walls. In another tradition based on the same source, the Etruscan Penates were Fortuna, Ceres, Genius Iovialis and Pales.

== Etymology ==
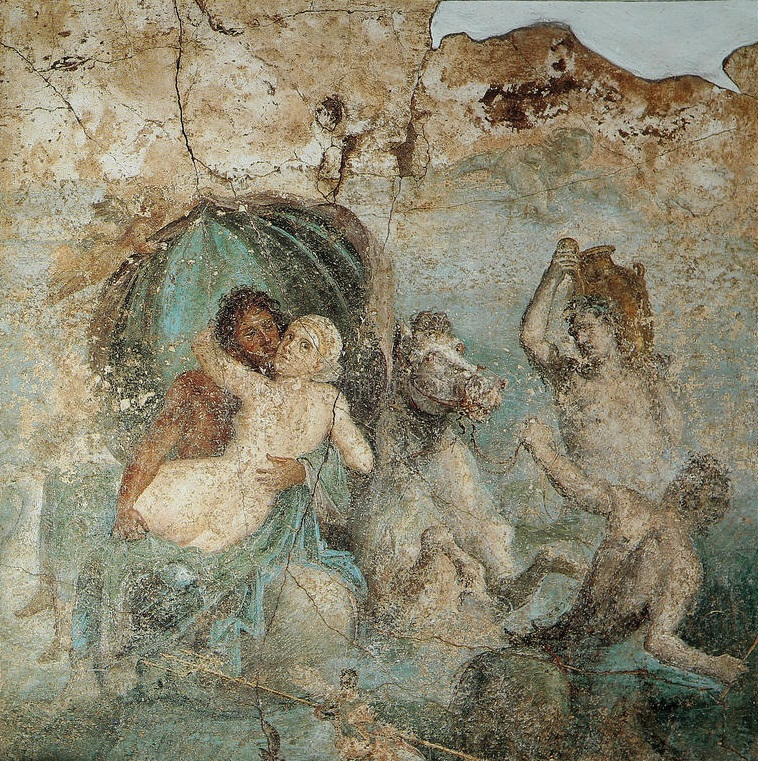
Neptune and Amymone, fresco in Stabiae, Italy, 1st century

The etymology of the Latin Neptunus is unclear and disputed. The ancient grammarian Varro derived the name from nuptus ("covering", opertio), alluding to nuptiae ("the marriage of Heaven and Earth").

Among modern scholars, Paul Kretschmer proposed a derivation from the Indo-European *neptu- ("moist substance"). Raymond Bloch similarly theorised that it might be an adjectival form (-no) of *nuptu- ("he who is moist").

Georges Dumézil said that words deriving from the root *nep- are not attested in Indo-European languages other than Vedic Sanskrit and Avestan. He proposed an etymology which joins Neptunus with the Indian and Iranian theonyms Apam Napat and Apam Napá and the Old Irish theonym Nechtan, all meaning "descendant of the waters". Using a comparative approach, the Indo-Iranian, Avestan and Irish figures have common features with the Roman legends about Neptune. Dumézil proposed to derive the nouns from the Indo-European root népōts- ("descendant, sister's son"). His former student, Indo-Europeanist Jaan Puhvel, theorises that the name might have meant "child (neve, nephew) of the water" as part of an Indo-European fire-in-water myth.

A different etymology, grounded in the legendary history of Latium and Etruria, was proposed by the 19th-century scholars Ludwig Preller, Karl Otfried Müller and Wilhelm Deeke. The name of the Etruscan deity Nethuns or Nethunus (NÈDVNVZ) would be an adjectival form of the toponym Nepe(t) or Nepete (present-day Nepi), near Falerii. The district was traditionally connected to the cult of Neptune, and Messapus and Halesus (the eponymous hero of Falerii) were believed to be his sons. Messapus led the Falisci (and others) to war in the Aeneid. Nepi and Falerii have been known since antiquity for the quality of their meadow springwater. Nepet might be considered a hydronymic toponym of pre-Indo-European origin from a noun meaning "damp wide valley, plain", a cognate of the proto-Greek νάπη ("wooded vale, chasm").

=== Fertility deity and divine ancestor ===
In lectures delivered during the 1990s, German scholar Hubert Petersmann proposed an etymology from the Indo-European root *nebh- ("damp, wet") with the suffix -tu (for an abstract verbal noun) and the adjectival suffix -no (domain of activity). The root *nebh- gives the Sanskrit nābhah, Hittite nepis, Latin nubs, nebula, German Nebel, and the Slavic nebo. The concept would be close to that expressed in the name of the Greek god Όυράνος (Uranus), derived from the root *h_{2}wórso- ("to water or irrigate") and *h_{2}worsó- ("the irrigator").

Petersmann proposes a different interpretation of Neptune's theology. Developing his understanding of the theonym as rooted in the Indo-European *nebh, he writes that the god would be an ancient deity of the cloudy, rainy sky in company with (and in opposition to) Zeus/Jupiter, the god of clear skies. Similar to Caelus, he would be the father of all earthly things through the fertilising power of rain. The hieros gamos of Neptune and Earth is reflected in Virgil's Aeneid V 14 (pater Neptunus). Neptune's power would be reflected by Salacia, one of his paredrae, who also denotes the overcast sky. His other paredra, Venilia, is associated with the wind as well as the sea. The theonym may be rooted in *venilis, a postulated adjective deriving from the IE root *ven(h) ("to love or desire") in the Sanskrit vánati, vanóti ("he loves"), German Wonne, and the Latin Venus, venia. Neptune's dual nature is found in Catullus 31. 3: "uterque Neptunus".

According to Petersmann, the ancient Indo-Europeans also venerated a god of wetness as the generator of life; this is indicated by the Hittite theonyms nepišaš (D)IŠKURaš or nepišaš (D)Tarhunnaš ("lord of sky wet"), the sovereign of Earth and humanity. Although this function was transferred to Zeus/Jupiter (the sovereigns of weather), the old function survived in literature: the Aeneid V 13-14 reads, "Heu, quianam tanti cinxerunt aethera nimbi?/ quidve, pater Neptune, paras?" ("What, why have so many clouds enringed the sky? What are you preparing, father Neptune?") The indispensability of water and its connection to reproduction are universally known.

Müller and Deeke interpreted Neptune's theology as a divine ancestor of the Latin Faliscans: the father of Messapus and Halesus, their heroic founders. William Warde Fowler considered Salacia the personification of the virile potency which generated a Latin people, parallel with Mars, Saturn, Janus and Jupiter.

== Depictions in art ==
Etruscan representations of Neptune are rare but significant. The oldest of them may be a fourth-century BC carved carnelian scarab from Vulci of Nethuns kicking a rock and creating a spring (Paris: Bibliothèque Nationale, Cabinet des Medailles. Another Etruscan artifact (Nethunus, from the Luynes collection) depicts the god causing a horse to spring from the earth with a blow of his trident.

A late-fourth-century bronze mirror in the Vatican Museums (Museo Gregoriano Etrusco: C.S.E. Vaticano 1.5a) depicts Neptune with Amymone (daughter of Danaus), whom he saves from assault by a satyr and teaches the art of creating springs. On a bronze mirror from Tuscania dated to 350 BC, also in the Vatican Museums (Museo Gregoriano Etrusco E. S. 1. 76), Nethuns is talking to Usil and Thesan. He holds a double-ended trident, suggesting that he might be able wield lightning bolts.

=== Gallery ===
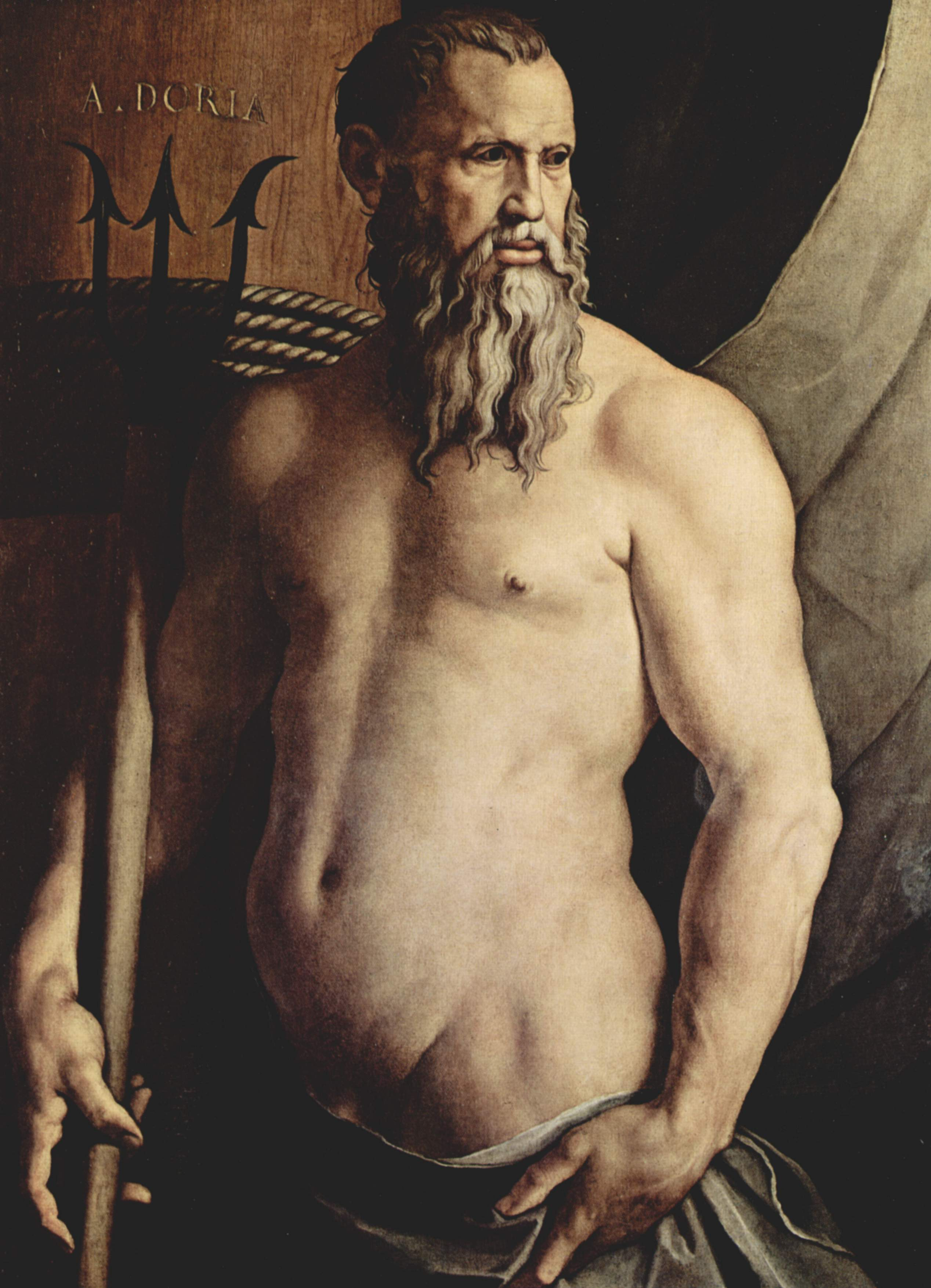
Agnolo Bronzino, Portrait of Andrea Doria as Neptune (c. 1530s or 1540s)

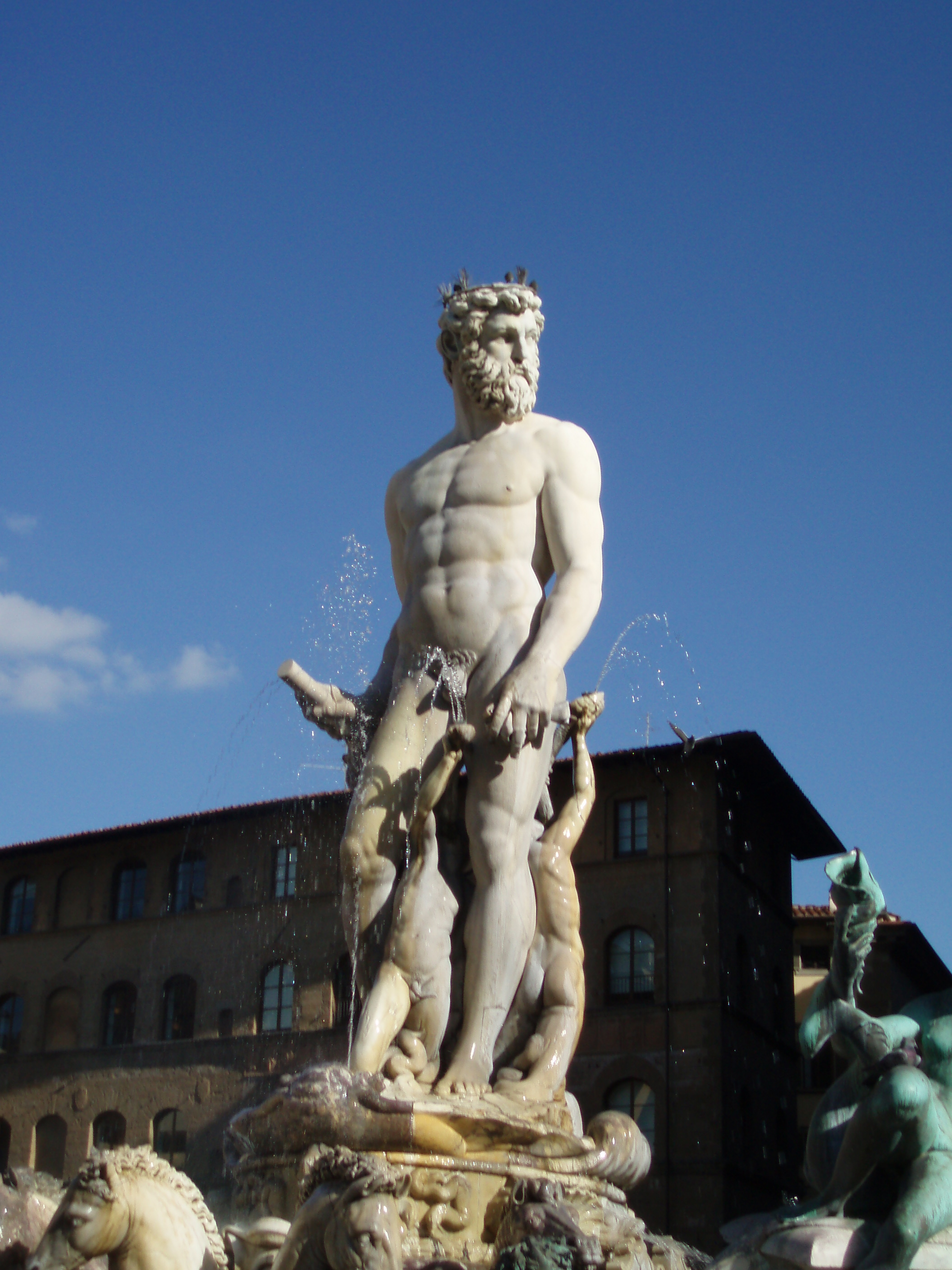
Bartolomeo Ammannati, Fountain of Neptune, Florence

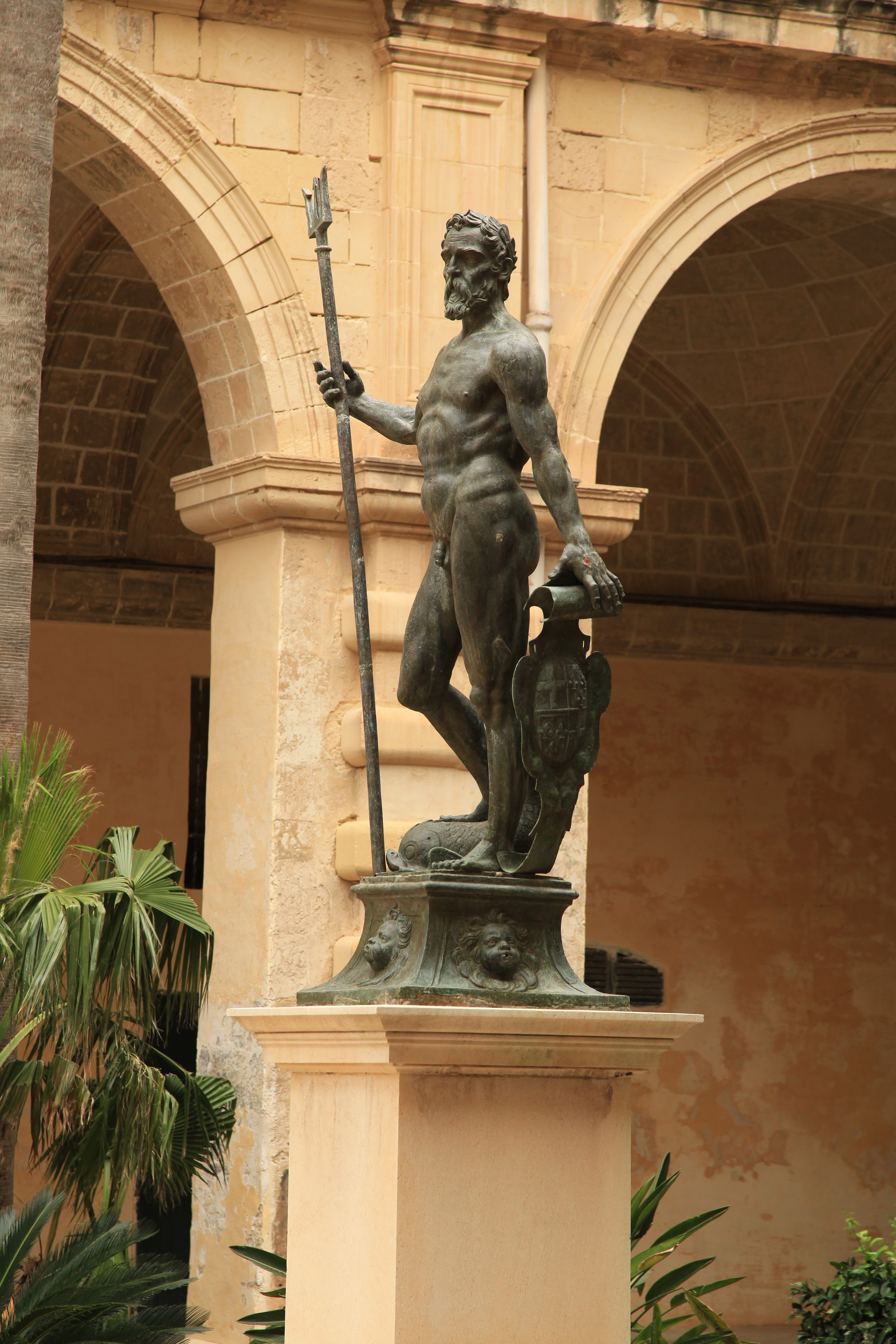
Late-16th-century bronze statue in Valletta, Malta

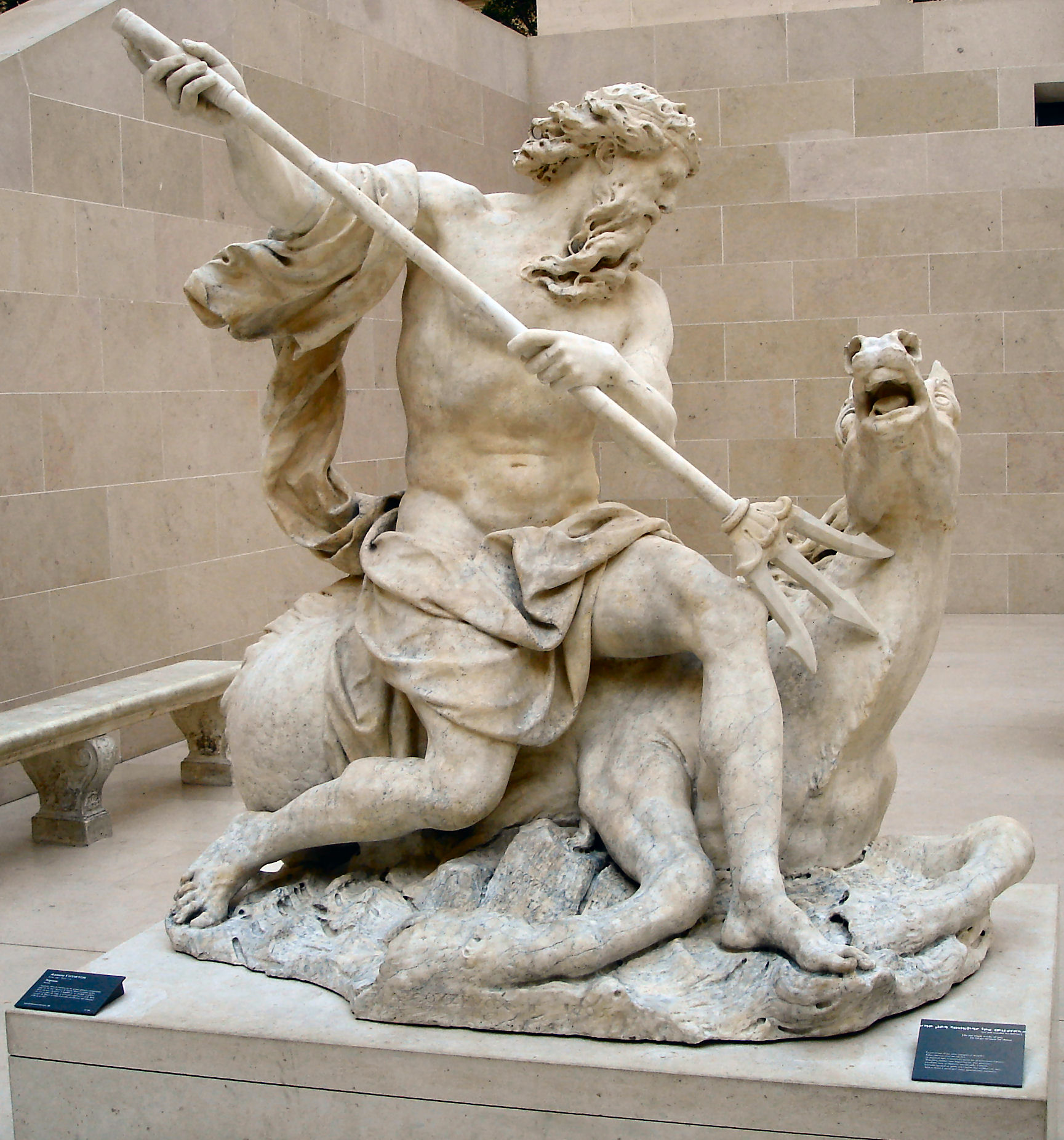
Antoine Coysevox's Neptune (1705) in the Louvre

Giovanni Battista Tiepolo, Neptune Offering Gifts to Venus (1748–1750)

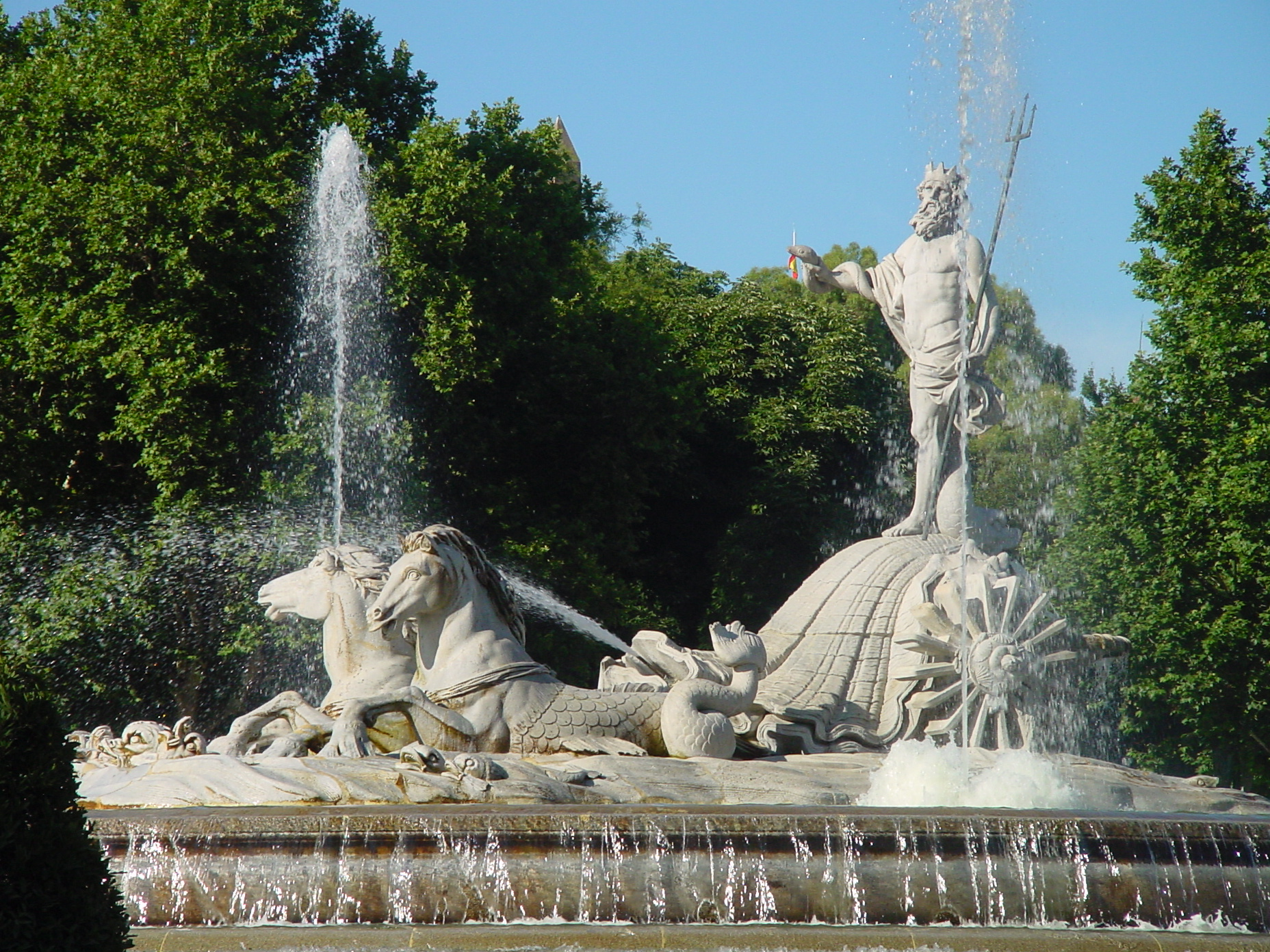
Juan Pascual de Mena, Fuente de Neptuno, Madrid (1780–1784)

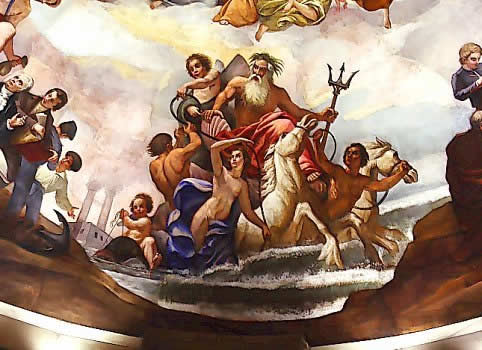
Constantino Brumidi, detail from The Apotheosis of Washington (1865), U.S. Capitol dome

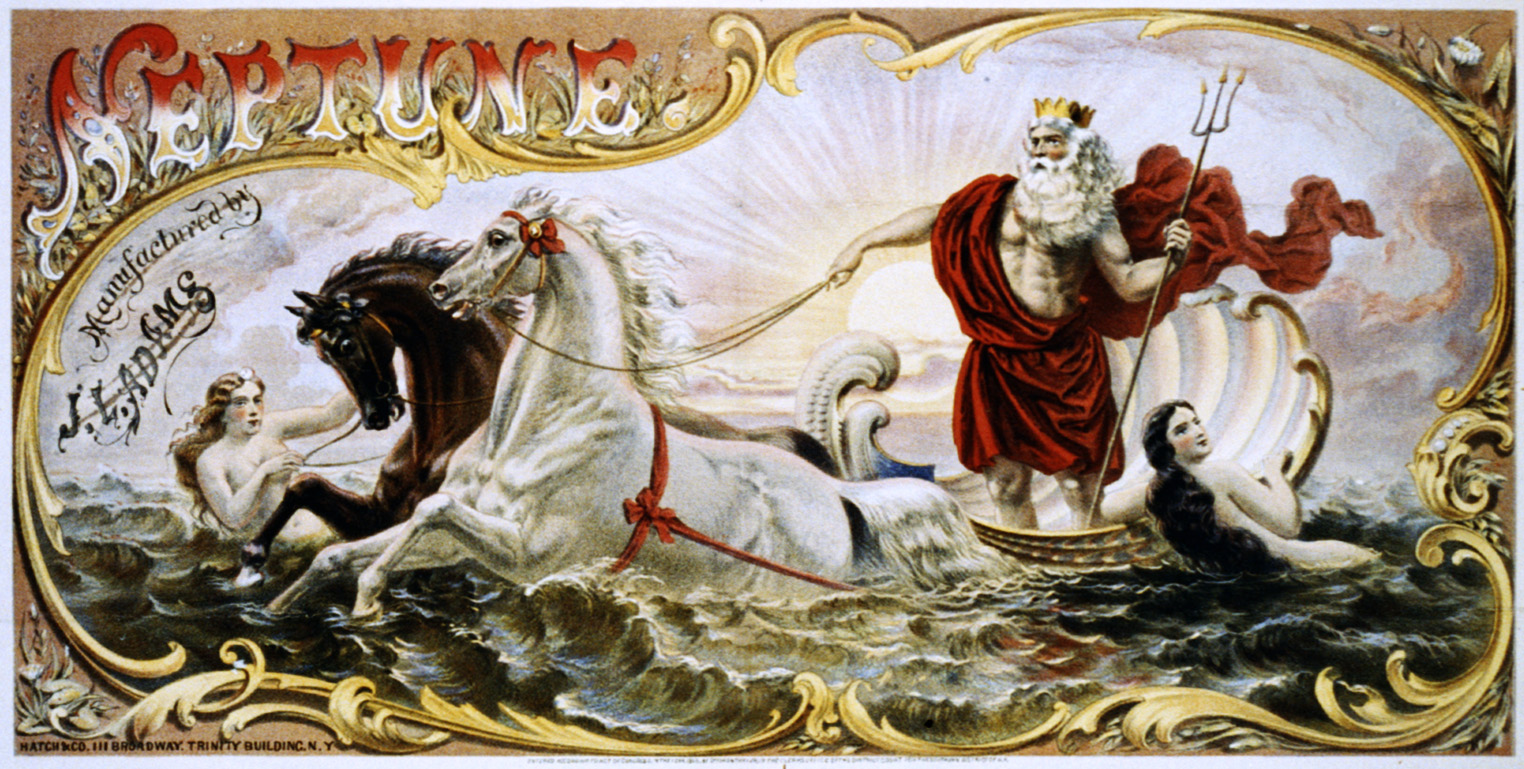
Neptune tobacco label (1860–1870)

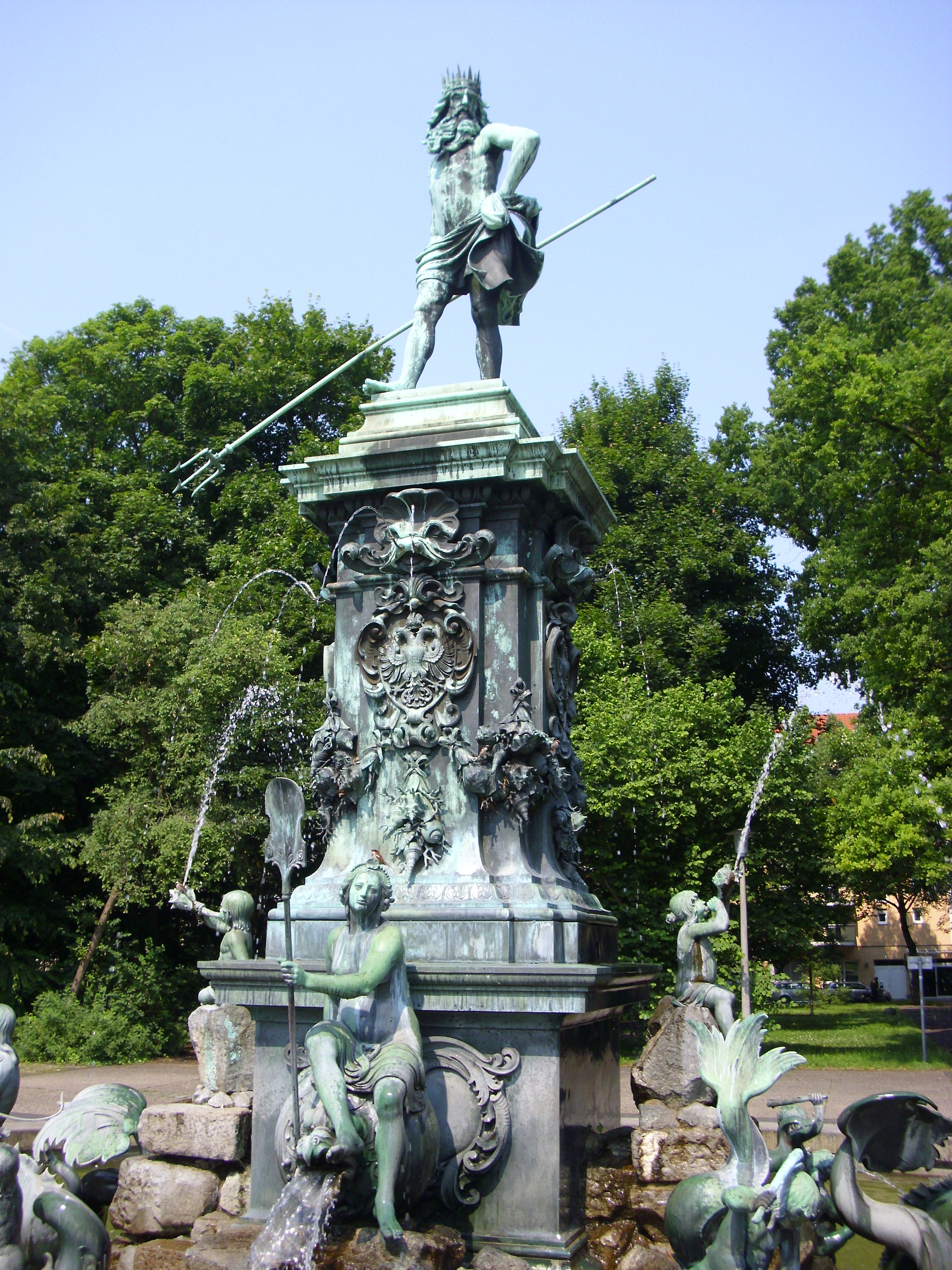
Neptune fountain in Nuremberg

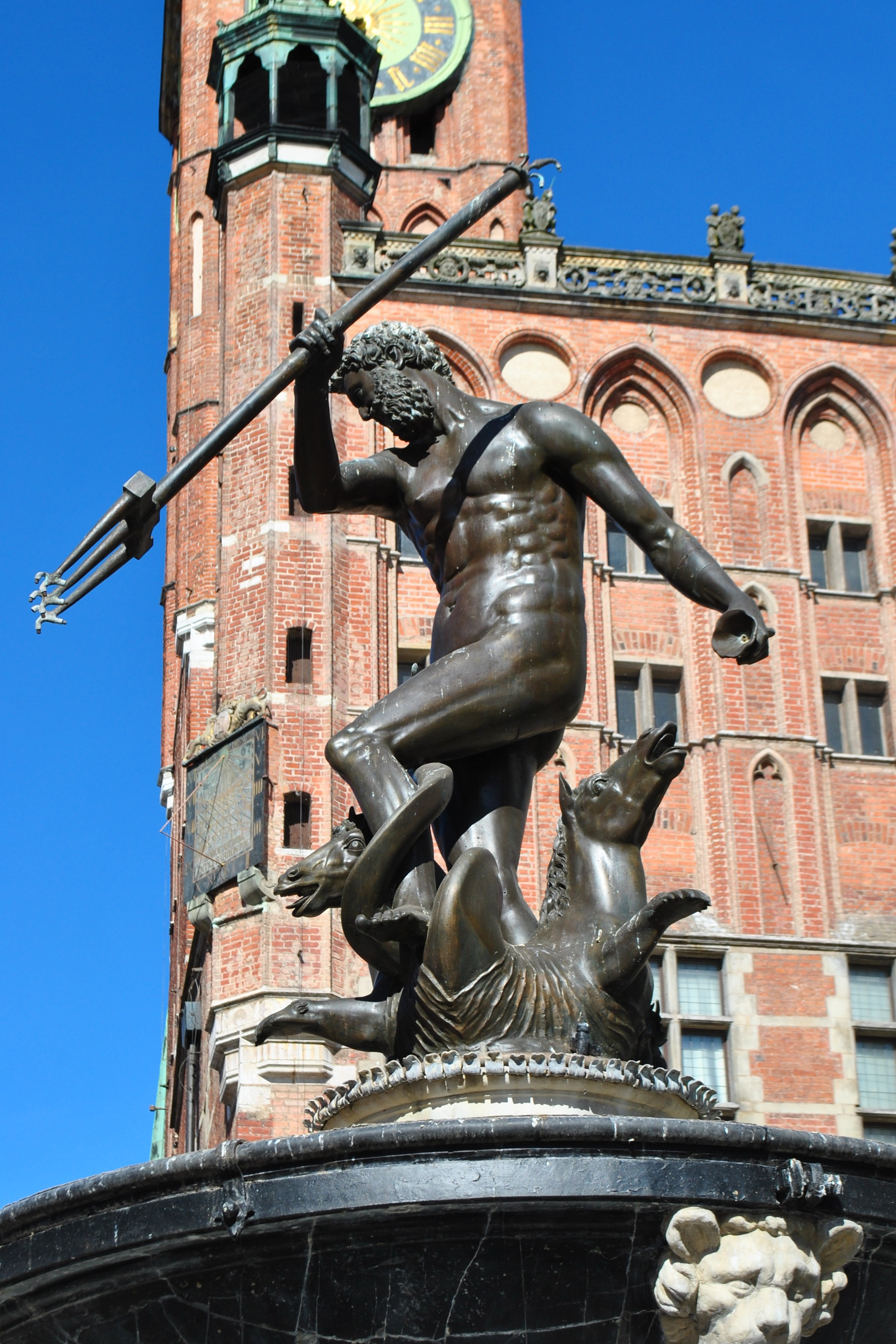
Neptune Monument in Gdańsk

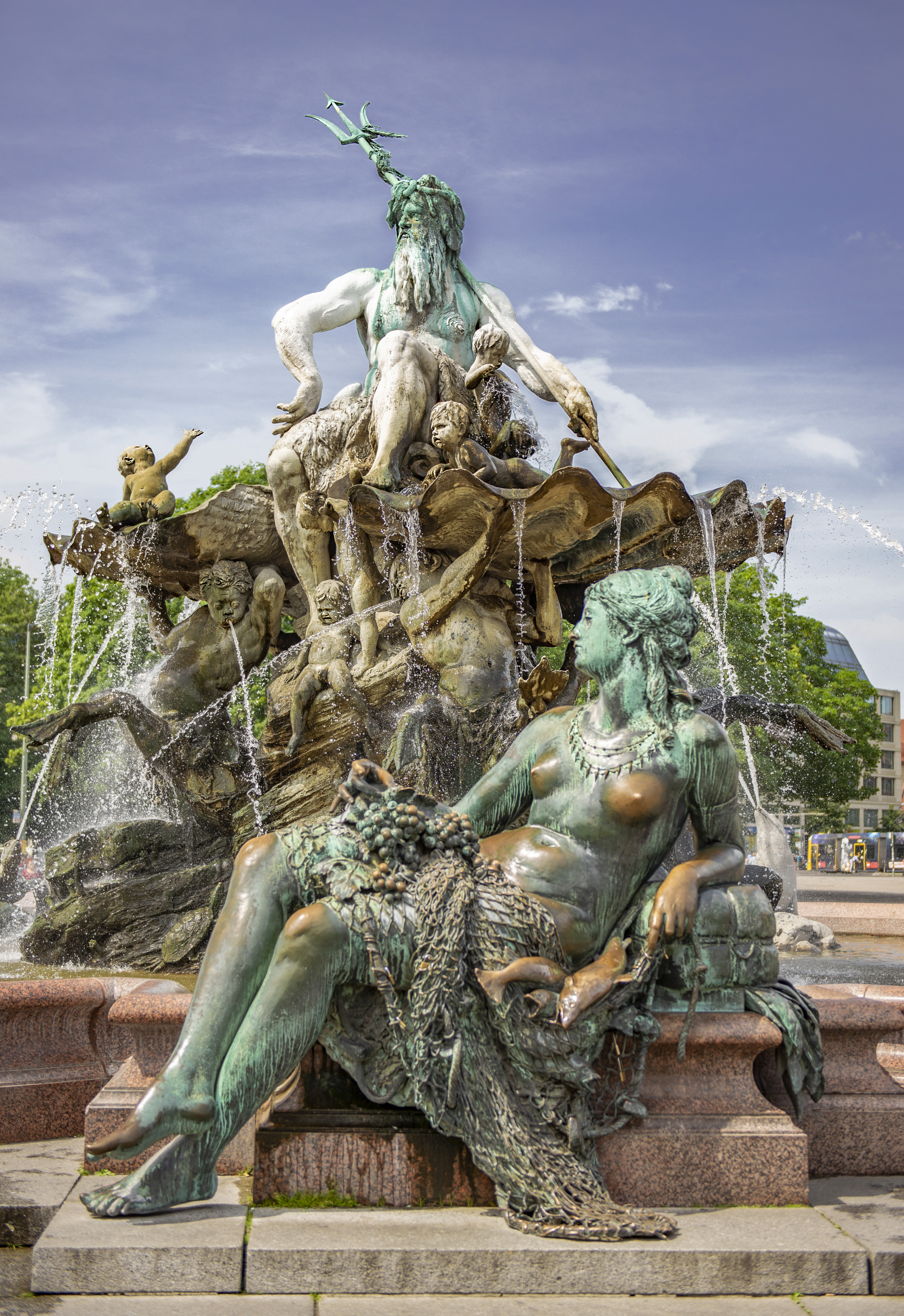
Neptunbrunnen in Berlin

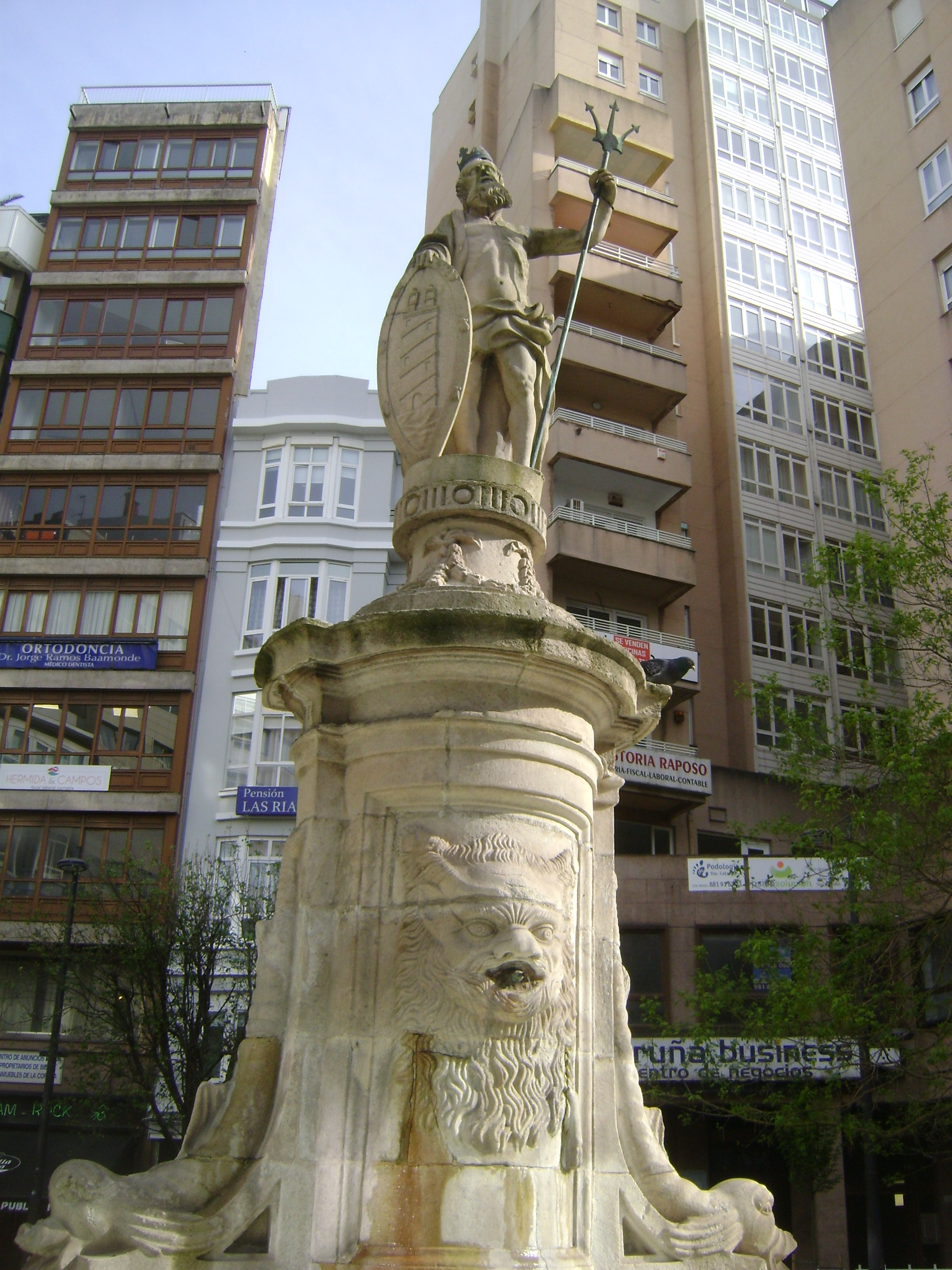
Neptune monument in La Coruña

== Bibliography ==
- Bloch, Raymond (1981). "Quelques remarques sur Poseidon, Neptunus et Nethuns". Comptes-rendus des séances de l' Académie des Inscriptions et Belles-Letres. Vol. 2. pp. 341–352.
- Nancy Thomson De Grummond 2006. Etruscan Mythology, Sacred History and Legend: An Introduction, University of Pennsylvania Museum of Archaeology, ISBN 1-931707-86-3.
- Georges Dumézil 1977. La religione romana arcaica. Con un 'appendice sulla religione degli Etruschi Edizione e traduzione a cura di Furio Jesi: Milano Rizzoli (Italian translation conducted on an expanded version of the 2nd edition of La religion romaine archaïque Paris Payot 1974).
- Fowler, William Warde (1912). The Religious experience of the Roman People. London.
- Sarolta A. Takacs 2008. Vestal Virgins, Sibyls and Matronae: Women in Roman Religion, University of Texas Press.
- Georg Wissowa 1912. Religion und Kultus der Rőmer Munich.
