= Carnival of Awussu =

Carnival in Tunisia

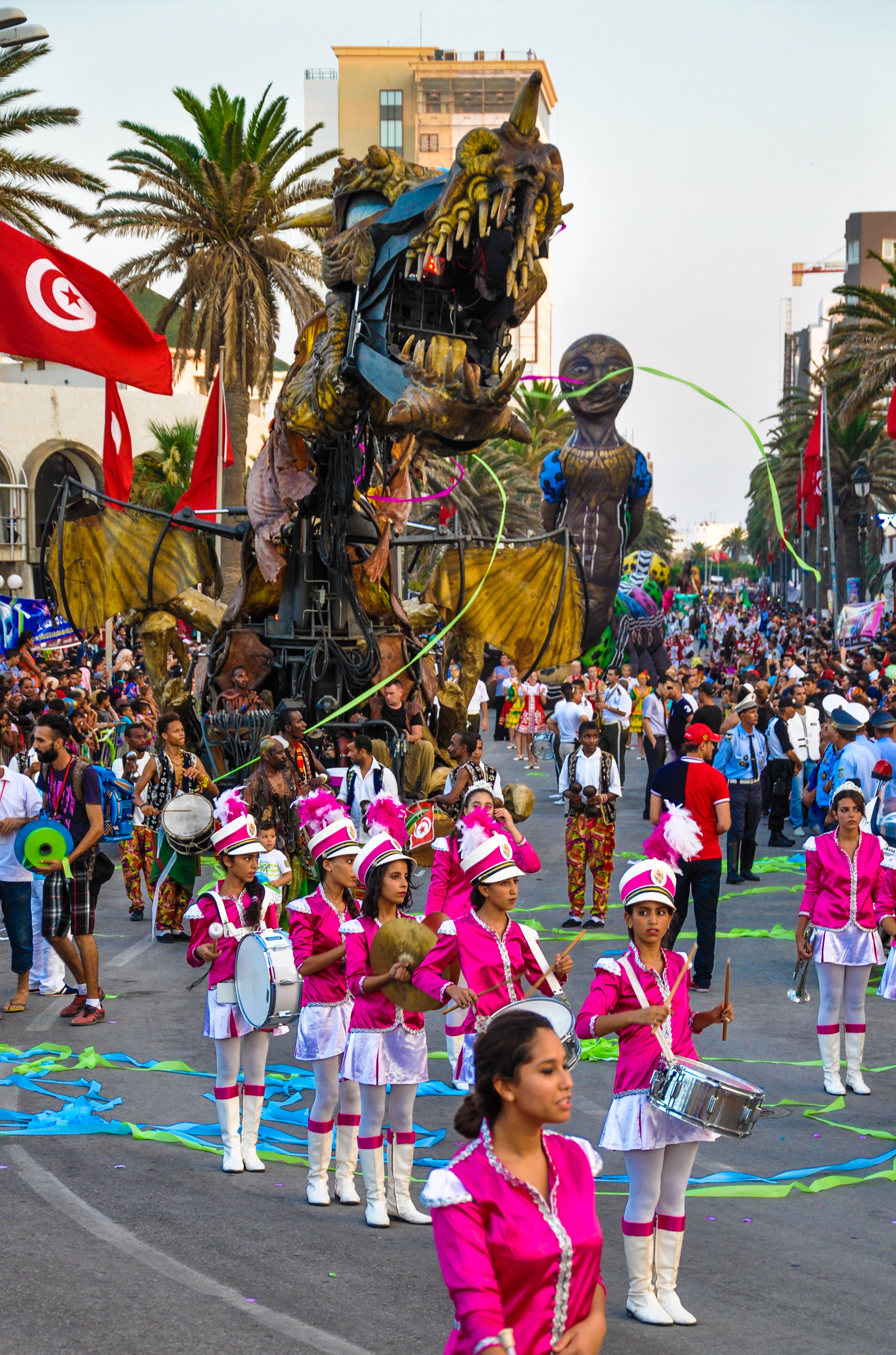
Awussu carnival parade, July 24, 2016

The Carnival of Awussu, or in French carnaval d'Aoussou, is an annual festive and cultural event that unfolds each 24th of July in Sousse, Tunisia.

It's a parade of symbolic chariots, fanfares and folk groups from Tunisia and elsewhere which takes place near the beach of Boujaafar, at the eve of the beginning of 'Awussu (the word, from Sicilian term Agustu ("August"), designating the heat wave of the same month according to the Berber calendar). According to some, originally it was a Pagan feast (Neptunalia) celebrating the god of the seas, Neptune in the Roman province of Africa, and might even go back to Phoenician times. The cult transformed as time unfold and lost all religious connotations. In the modern era, prior to the Tunisian revolution, the festival was used for political propaganda.

In 2014, it was canceled for organizational and financial reasons, but celebrations of the festival resumed in 2015.
