= Heinrich Ritter =

German philosopher and historian (1791–1869)

Heinrich August Ritter (German: [ˈʁɪtɐ]; 21 November 1791 – 3 February 1869) was a German philosopher and historian of philosophy.

He was born in Zerbst, and studied philosophy and theology at the University of Göttingen and Berlin until 1815. In 1824 he became an associate professor of philosophy at Berlin, later transferring to Kiel, where he occupied the chair of philosophy from 1833 to 1837. He then accepted a similar position at the University of Göttingen, where he remained till his death. Friedrich Schleiermacher was a major influence in his thinking.

== Works ==
Ritter's chief work was a history of philosophy (Geschichte der Philosophie) published in twelve volumes at Hamburg from 1829 to 1853. This work was the product of a wide and thorough knowledge of the subject aided by an impartial critical faculty, and its value was underscored by its translation into almost all the languages of Europe. He wrote also accounts of ancient schools of philosophy, such as the Ionians, the Pythagoreans and the Megarians.

Beside these important historical works, he published a large number of treatises of which the following may be mentioned:

- Abriss der philosophischen Logik (1824).
- Geschichte der Philosophie (1829–1853; 2nd edition, vols. i–iv, 1836–1838) — its 1st section, "Geschichte der philosophie alter zeit", was translated into English by Alexander J.W. Morrison and published as: The history of ancient philosophy (1838–46).
- Ueber das Verhältnis der Philosophie zum Leben (1835).
- Historia philosophiae Graeco-Romanae (in collaboration with Ludwig Preller, 1838; 7th edition, 1888).
- Kleine philosophische Schriften (1839–1840).
- Versuch zur Verständigung über die neueste deutsche Philosophie seit Kant (1853).
- System der Logik und Metaphysik (1856).
- Die christliche Philosophie bis auf die neuesten Zeiten (2 volumes, 1858–1859).
- Encyklopädie der philosophischen Wissenschaften (1862–1864).
- Ernest Renan, über die Naturwissenschaften und die Geschichte (1865).
- Ueber das Böse und seine Folgen (1869).
