= Nethuns =

Etruscan water god

- God of wells, water, and the sea
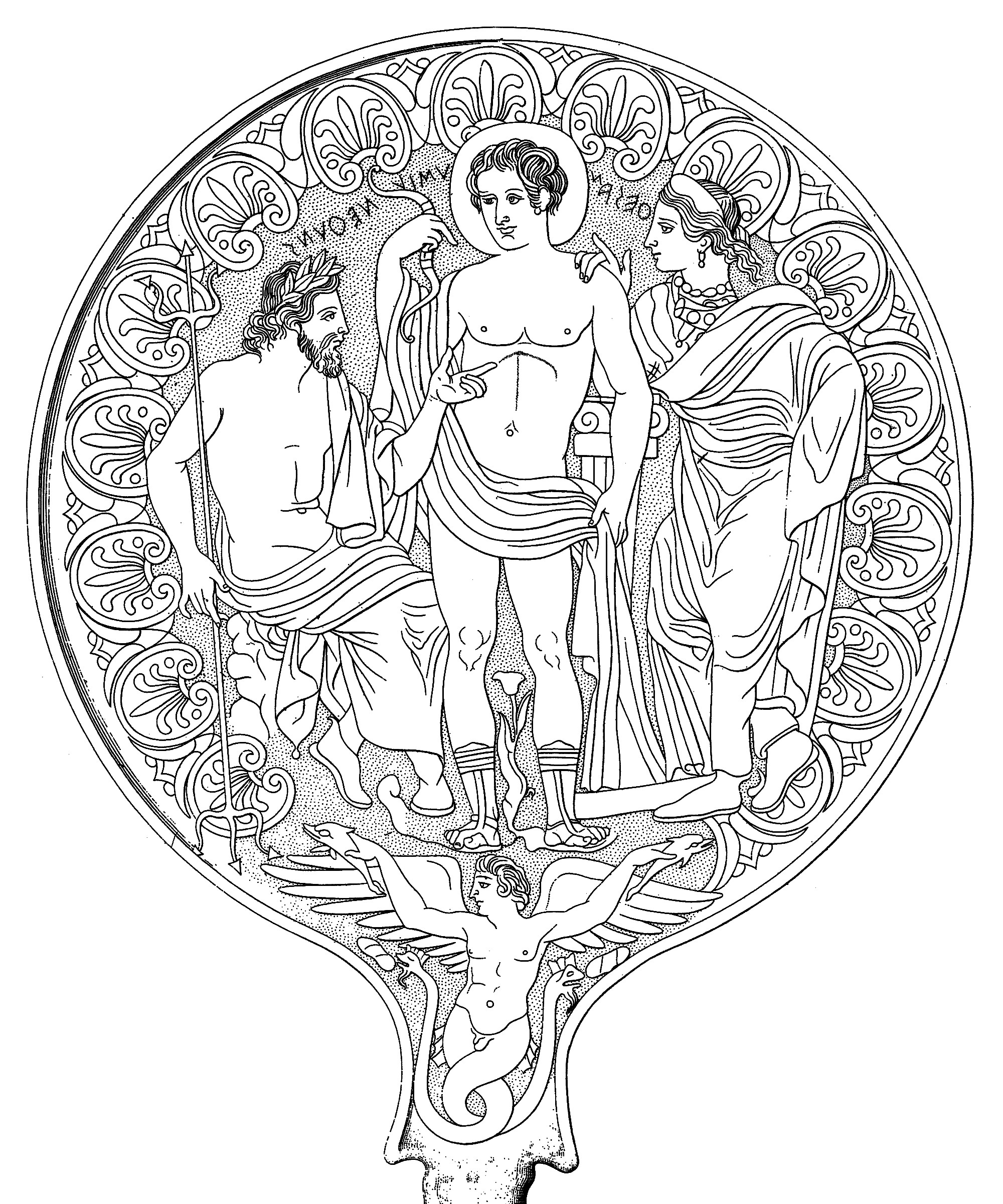
- 350 BCE bronze mirror from Tuscania showing from left to right, Nethuns, the sun god Usil, and the dawn goddess Thesan

In Etruscan mythology, Nethuns was the god of wells, later expanded to all water, including the sea. The name "Nethuns" is likely cognate with that of the Celtic god Nechtan and the Persian and Vedic gods sharing the name Apam Napat, perhaps all based on the Proto-Indo-European word *népōts "nephew, grandson." If this theory is correct, Etruscan may have borrowed the Umbrian name *Nehtuns (Roman Neptune, who was originally a god of water).

Nethuns is mentioned on the Piacenza liver, a third-century BC bronze model of a sheep's liver used for divinatory rites called haruspicy, as Neθ, an abbreviation for his full name. As a patron god his profile, wearing a ketos (sea monster) headdress, appears on a coin of Vetulonia, circa 215 – 211 BC; he is accompanied by his trident between two dolphins.

NETHUNS is engraved on a bronze Etruscan mirror in the Museo Gregoriano in the Vatican.
