= Vitulatio =

The Vitulatio was an annual thanksgiving celebrated in ancient Rome on July 8, the day after the Nonae Caprotinae and following the Poplifugia on July 5. The Poplifugia is a lesser-known festival that was of obscure origin even for the Romans themselves; Macrobius says that it marked a Roman retreat from the Etruscans at Fidenae during the Gallic invasion, and that the Vitulatio commemorated their comeback victory. It was a dies religiosus, a day of religious prohibition when people were to refrain from undertaking any activity other than attending to basic necessities.

By the late Republic, the Vitulatio, like the other festivals held July 5–8, seems to have been eclipsed by the popularity of the Ludi Apollinares, games (ludi) held in honor of Apollo July 6–13.

== Etymology ==
The verb vitulari meant to chant or recite a formula with a joyful intonation and rhythm. Macrobius says vitulari is the equivalent of Greek paianizein (παιανίζειν), "to sing a paean," a song expressing triumph or thanksgiving. He offers, however, an antiquarian range of etymologies, including one from victoria, "victory." One modern explanation relates the word Vitulatio to vitulus, "heifer," the animal that served as a ritual scapegoat at Iguvium, as described by the Iguvine Tablets.
