= Lucaria =

Ancient Roman festival of the grove

In ancient Roman religion, the Lucaria was a festival of the grove (Latin lucus) held 19 and 21 July. The original meaning of the ritual was obscure by the time of Varro (mid-1st century BC), who omits it in his list of festivals. The deity for whom it was celebrated is unknown; if a ritual for grove-clearing recorded by Cato pertains to this festival, the invocation was deliberately anonymous (Si deus, si dea). The dates of the Lucaria are recorded in the Fasti Amiterni, a calendar dating from the reign of Tiberius found at Amiternum (now S. Vittorino) in Sabine territory.

The Augustan grammarian Verrius Flaccus connected the Lucaria to the disastrous defeat of the Romans by the Gauls at the Battle of the Allia, which was fought on 18 July. The festival, he says, was celebrated in the large grove between the Via Salaria and the Tiber river, where the Romans who survived the battle had hidden. The Via Salaria crossed the battlefield about 10 miles north of Rome. The lucus thus would have been located on the Pincian Hill, which was later cultivated as gardens and leisure parks by Lucullus, Pompeius, Sallust and others. This explanatory story has been compared to that of the Poplifugia, which also involved the Gallic sack of Rome. The story may be more aetiological than historical. The Lucaria suggests that grove veneration was a practice which the early Romans had in common with the Gauls.

Like other "fixed holidays" (dies nefasti publici) on the Roman calendar, the Lucaria took place on days of uneven number, with an intervening day that was "non-festive". A mention by Macrobius seems to imply that the festival began at night and continued the following day. Georg Wissowa thought that it may have been connected to the Neptunalia on 23 July, when leafy huts, called umbrae, were built as shelters to protect against the hot summer sun and bulls were sacrificed. Neptune embodied fresh as well as salt water among the Romans, and the collocation of festivals in July, including the Furrinalia on the 25th, may express concerns for drought.

== See also ==
- Lucus
