= Iunius (month) =

Month in the ancient Roman calendar

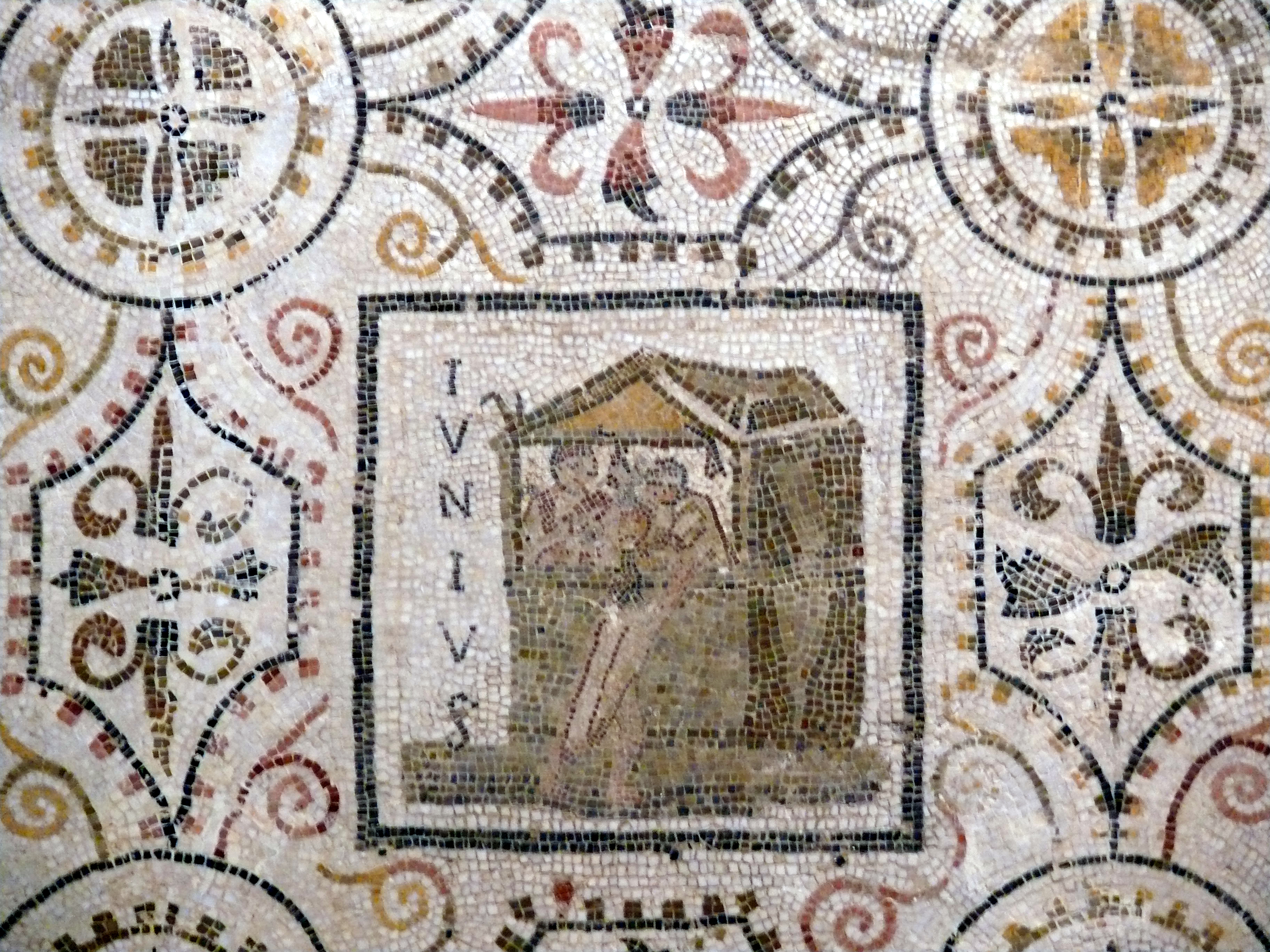
June panel from a Roman mosaic of the months (from El Djem, Tunisia, first half of 3rd century AD)

Mensis Iunius or Iunius, also Junius (June), was the sixth month of the Roman calendar of the classical period, following Maius (May). In the oldest calendar attributed by the Romans to Romulus, Iunius had been the fourth month in a ten-month year that began with March (Martius, "Mars' month"). The month following June was thus called Quinctilis or Quintilis, the "fifth" month. Iunius had 29 days until a day was added during the Julian reform of the calendar in the mid-40s BC. The month that followed Iunius was renamed Iulius (July) in honour of Julius Caesar.

== Name of the month ==
In his poem on the Roman calendar, Ovid has three goddesses present three different derivations of the name Iunius. Juno asserts that the month is named for her. Juventas ("Youth") pairs Iunius with Maius: the former, she says, comes from junior, "a younger person", in contrast to maiores or the "elders" for whom May was named. Juno's own name may derive from the same root meaning "young", and these two possibilities may be reconcilable. Ovid has Concordia claim that Iunius comes from iungo, iunctus, "join", in honor of her uniting the Romans and the Sabines. Elsewhere, an even less likely derivation relates the month name to Marcus Iunius Brutus, a member of the gens Iunia who made the first sacrifice to Dea Carna on the Kalends (June 1).

== Iconography ==
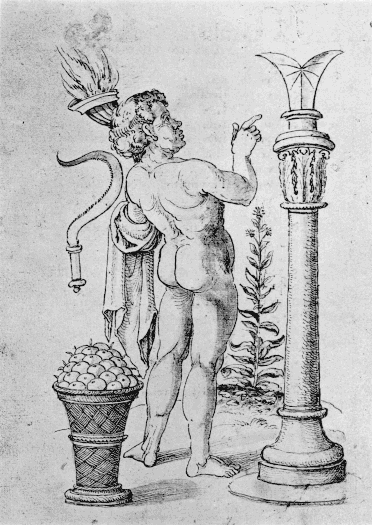
Illustration for the month of June, based on the 4th-century Calendar of Filocalus

Month illustrations that draw on the Calendar of Filocalus (354 AD) show a nude male holding a torch that may be an allegory of the summer solstice. Solstitium is noted on June 24 of the calendar. The torch may be a reference to dies lampadarum, "day of torches", variously interpreted as the sun's rays or as the torch of Ceres, the grain goddess who carried a torch while searching for her abducted daughter Proserpina. The solstice marked the beginning of the harvest, which is represented by the basket of fruit and a sickle. The plant may be a bean, since June 1 was the "Bean Kalends".

== Dates ==
The Romans did not number days of a month sequentially from the 1st through the last day. Instead, they counted back from the three fixed points of the month: the Nones (5th or 7th, depending on the length of the month), the Ides (13th or 15th), and the Kalends (1st) of the following month. The Nones of June was the 5th, and the Ides the 13th. Roman counting was inclusive; June 9 was ante diem V Idūs Iunias, "the 5th day before the Ides of June," usually abbreviated a.d. V Id. Iun. (or with the a.d. omitted altogether). The last day of June was the pridie Kalendas Quinctilis (pridie Kalendas Iulias after July was renamed), "day before the Kalends of July". The modern equivalent of this date was June 29 on the pre-Julian calendar, but June 30 on the Julian, because June was one of the months to which a day was added in realigning with astronomical time. June 23 was thus VIII Kal. Quinct., "the 8th day before the Kalends of Quinctilis", during the Republican era, but IX Kal. Iul., "the 9th day before the Kalends of July", in the Imperial era.

On the calendar of the Republic and early Principate, each day was marked with a letter to denote its religiously lawful status. In June, these were:

- F for dies fasti, days when it was legal to initiate action in the courts of civil law;
- C for dies comitalis, a day on which the Roman people could hold assemblies (comitia), elections, and certain kinds of judicial proceedings;
- N for dies nefasti, when these political activities and the administration of justice were prohibited;
- NP, the meaning of which remains elusive, but which marked feriae, public holidays.

By the late 2nd century AD, extant calendars no longer show days marked with these letters, probably in part as a result of calendar reforms undertaken by Marcus Aurelius. The unique Q.ST.D.F. of June 15 stands for Quando stercum delatum fas, when it was a religious obligation to remove dirt from the Temple of Vesta. Varro specifies the act of sweeping (everritur)'.

Days were also marked with nundinal letters in cycles of A B C D E F G H, to mark the "market week" (these are omitted in the table below).

Festivals marked in large letters on extant fasti, represented by festival names in all capital letters on the table, are thought to have been the most ancient holidays, becoming part of the calendar before 509 BC. A dies natalis was an anniversary such as a temple founding or rededication, sometimes thought of as the "birthday" of a deity.

Unless otherwise noted, the dating and observances on the following table are from H.H. Scullard, Festivals and Ceremonies of the Roman Republic. Scullard places the Taurian Games on June 25–26 on a five-year cycle, but other scholars believe these ludi had no regular date and were held as a crisis ritual when needed. After the Ides, dual dates are given to represent both the earlier calendar, when June had 29 days and July was called Quinctilis, and the 30-day month of the Julian calendar.

Modern date	Roman date	status	Observances
June 1	Kalendae Iuniae	N	• dies natalis of the Temple of Juno Moneta • dies natalis of the Temple of Mars outside the Porta Capena • dies natalis of the Temple of the Tempestates • festival of Carna, popularly known as the "Bean Kalends", and in the later Empire the last day of the Ludi Fabarici ("Bean Games")
2	a.d. IV Non. Iun.	F	
3	III Non. Iun.	C	• dies natalis of the Temple of Bellona in the Circus Flaminius
4	prid. Non. Iun.	C	• dies natalis of the Temple of Hercules Magnus Custos ("Hercules the Great Watchman") near the Circus Flaminius, with ludi added in the Imperial era
5	Nonae Iuniae	N	• dies natalis of the Temple of Dius Fidius
6	VIII Id. Iun.	N	• Colossus coronatur: the colossal statue of Sol was wreathed (Imperial era)
7	VII Id. Iun.	N dies religiosus	• Vesta aperitur ("Vesta is opened"), when the inner sanctum of the Temple of Vesta was opened for women only • Ludi Piscatorii, "Fishermen's Games"
8	VI Id. Iun.	N dies religiosus	• dies natalis of the Temple of Mens
9	V Id. Iun.	N dies religiosus	• VESTALIA
10	IV Id. Iun.	N	
11	III Id. Iun.	NP dies religiosus	• MATRALIA • dies natalis of the Temple of Fortuna in the Forum Boarium
12	prid. Id. Iun.	N	
13	Idūs Iuniae	NP dies religiosus	• monthly Feriae Iovi • Lesser Quinquatrus
14	XVII Kal. Quinct. XVIII Kal. Iul.	N	
15	XVI Kal. Quinct. XVII Kal. Iul.	F Q.ST.D.F. dies religiosus	• Vesta clauditur, inner sanctum of Vesta closed
16	XV Kal. Quinct. XVI Kal. Iul.	C	
17	XIV Kal. Quinct. XV Kal. Iul.	C	
18	XIII Kal. Quinct. XIV Kal. Iul.	C	
19	XII Kal. Quinct. XIII Kal. Iul.	C	• dies natalis for the Temple of Minerva on the Aventine
20	XI Kal. Quinct. XII Kal. Iul.	C	• dies natalis for the Temple of Summanus near the Circus Maximus
21	X Kal. Quinct. XI Kal. Iul.	C	
22	IX Kal. Quinct. X Kal. Iul.	C	
23	VIII Kal. Quinct. IX Kal. Iul.	C	
24	VII Kal. Quinct. VIII Kal. Iul.	C	• dies natalis for the Temple of Fors Fortuna across the Tiber • Solstice or dies lampadarum
25	VI Kal. Quinct. VII Kal. Iul.	C	
26	V Kal. Quinct. VI Kal. Iul.	C	
27	IV Kal. Quinct. V Kal. Iul.	C	• dies natales for a Temple of the Lares and of Jupiter Stator on the Palatine
28	III Kal. Quinct. IV Kal. Iul.	C	
29	prid. Kal. Quinct. III Kal. Iul.	C	
30	prid. Kal. Iul.	C	
