= Furrina =

Roman goddess

Furrina, also spelled Furina, was an ancient Roman goddess whose function had become obscure by the 1st century BC. Her cult dated to the earliest period of Roman religious history, since she was one of the fifteen deities who had their own flamen, the Furrinalis, one of the flamines minores. There is some evidence that Furrina was associated with water.

== Etymology ==
Furrina was a goddess of springs. According to Georges Dumézil, her name was related to the moving or bubbling of water. It is cognate with Gothic brunna ("spring"), Latin fervēre, from *fruur > furr by metathesis of the vowel, meaning to bubble or boil. Compare English "fervent", "effervescent", and Latin defruutum ("boiled wine").

== Religious sites ==
She had a sacred spring and a shrine in Rome, located on the southwestern slopes of Mount Janiculum, on the right bank of the Tiber. The site has survived to the present day in the form of a grove, included within the gardens of Villa Sciarra. Excavations on the site conducted in 1910 identified a well and a system of underground channels, as well as some inscriptions dedicated to Jupiter Optimus Maximus Heliopolitanus, Agatis, and the nymphae furrinae. However, these findings look to be of a later date (2nd century CE) and perhaps the well is not the original spring.

Gaius Gracchus was killed in the Grove of Furrina.

According to Cicero, another sanctuary dedicated to the cult of Furrina was located near Satricum. This place was not the most widely known one, but a hamlet near Arpinum was.

== Festival ==
Furrina's festival was the Furrinalia, held on July 25. On the Roman calendar, festivals separated by an interval of three days were interconnected and belonged to the same function. In the second half of July, the two Lucaria occur on the 19th and 17th, with the Neptunalia on the 23rd and the Furrinalia on the 25th. This grouping is devoted to woods and running waters, which are intended as shelter and relief from the heat of the season, the canicula.

Furrina is a low ranking deity who has her seat just above the mountain peaks.

== In popular media ==
Furina de Fontaine is a playable 5-star character in the Chinese gacha game Genshin Impact. Introduced as the flamboyant and overconfident Hydro Archon, Furina's theatrics are eventually revealed to be a public persona, which she later discards in favor of living a relatively humbler life as an actress and artistic consultant.

== Sources ==
- Altheim, Franz (1938). A History of Roman Religion. Harold Mattingly, trans. London: Metheun.
- Dowden, Ken (2000). European Paganism: The Realities of Cult from Antiquity to the Middle Ages. London: Routledge.
