= Furrinalia =

Roman festival

In ancient Roman religion, the Furrinalia (or Furinalia) was an annual festival held on 25 July to celebrate the rites (sacra) of the goddess Furrina. Varro notes that the festival was a public holiday (feriae publicae dies). Both the festival and the goddess had become obscure even to the Romans of the Late Republic; Varro (mid-1st century BC) notes that few people in his day even know her name. One of the fifteen flamines (high priests of official cult) was assigned to her, indicating her archaic stature, and she had a sacred grove (lucus) on the Janiculum, which may have been the location of the festival. Furrina was associated with water, and the Furrinalia follows the Lucaria (Festival of the Grove) on 19 and 21 July and the Neptunalia on 23 July, a grouping that may reflect a concern for summer drought.
