= Poplifugia =

Ancient Roman festival

The Poplifugia or Populifugia (Latin: the people's flight) was a festival of ancient Rome celebrated on July 5, according to Varro. This festival commemorated Romans' flight during a critical period when the inhabitants of Ficuleae and Fidenae took up arms against them. This occurred shortly after the city had been ravaged by the Gauls (see Battle of the Allia). The subsequent traditional Roman victory was commemorated on July 7, known as the Nonae Caprotinae, serving as a feast dedicated to Juno Caprotina. On the following day, the Vitulatio took place, which was believed to signify the thanksgiving offering presented by the pontifices in response to the event. Macrobius, who inaccurately places the Poplifugia on the nones, suggests that it memorialized a flight in the face of the Tuscans, while Dionysius traces its origins back to the time when the patricians murdered Romulus, occurring after the populace had dispersed from a public assembly due to rain and darkness.
