= Caprotinia =

Ancient Roman festivals celebrated on July 7

The Caprotinia, or feasts of Juno Caprotina, were ancient Roman festivals which were celebrated on July 7, in favor of the female slaves. During this solemnity, they ran about, beating themselves with their fists and with rods. None but women assisted in the sacrifices offered at this feast.

Plutarch's Life of Numa and Life of Camillus offer two possible origins for this feast, or the famous Nonae Caprotinae or Poplifugium. Firstly—and, in Plutarch's opinion, most likely—it commemorates the mysterious disappearance of Romulus during a violent thunderstorm that interrupted an assembly in the Palus Caprae ("Goats' Marsh"). Secondly, it commemorates a Roman victory by Camillus over the Latins; according to a minor tradition, a Roman serving maid or slave dressed as a noblewoman and surrendered herself to the Latins as hostage; that night, she climbed a wild fig-tree (caprificus, literally "goat-fig") and gave the Romans a torchlight signal to attack.

== Further reference ==
- Drossart, Paul. « Nonae Caprotinae » : La fausse capture des Aurores. In: Revue de l'histoire des religions, tome 185, n°2, 1974. pp. 129–139. DOI: https://doi.org/10.3406/rhr.1974.10134 ; www.persee.fr/doc/rhr_0035-1423_1974_num_185_2_10134
