= Ludwig Preller =

German classical philologist and writer (1809–1861)

Ludwig Preller (15 September 1809 – 21 June 1861) was a German philologist and antiquarian.

== Biography ==
Born in Hamburg, he studied at Leipzig, Berlin and Göttingen, in 1838 he was appointed to the professorship of philology at the Imperial University of Dorpat, which, however, he resigned in 1843. He afterwards spent some time in Italy, but settled in Jena in 1844, where he became professor in 1846. In 1847 he relocated as head librarian to Weimar.

His chief works are: Demeter und Persephone (1837), Griechische Mythologie (1854–1855) and Römische Mythologie (1858). He also co-operated with Heinrich Ritter in the preparation of Historia philosophiae graecae et romanae ex fontium locis contexta (1838).

He contributed extensively to Ersch and Gruber's Allgemeine Encyklopädie and Pauly's Realencyclopädie der classischen Altertumswissenschaft.

He died in Weimar.

== Selected works ==
- Demeter und Persephone. Ein Cyclus mythologischer Untersuchungen, 1837.
- with Heinrich Ritter: Historia philosophiae Graecae et Romanae ex fontium locis contexta, 1838.
- Polemonis Periegetae fragmenta, Leipzig 1838.
- Die Regionen der Stadt Rom, Jena 1846.
- Carl Otto v. Madai zur Erinnerung an ihn für seine Freunde, Breitkopf und Härtel, Leipzig 1850.
- Griechische Mythologie, 2 vols. Weidmann, Berlin 1854.
- Römische Mythologie 1858.
