= Neptunalia =

Festival in honor of Neptune as god of waters, celebrated at Rome

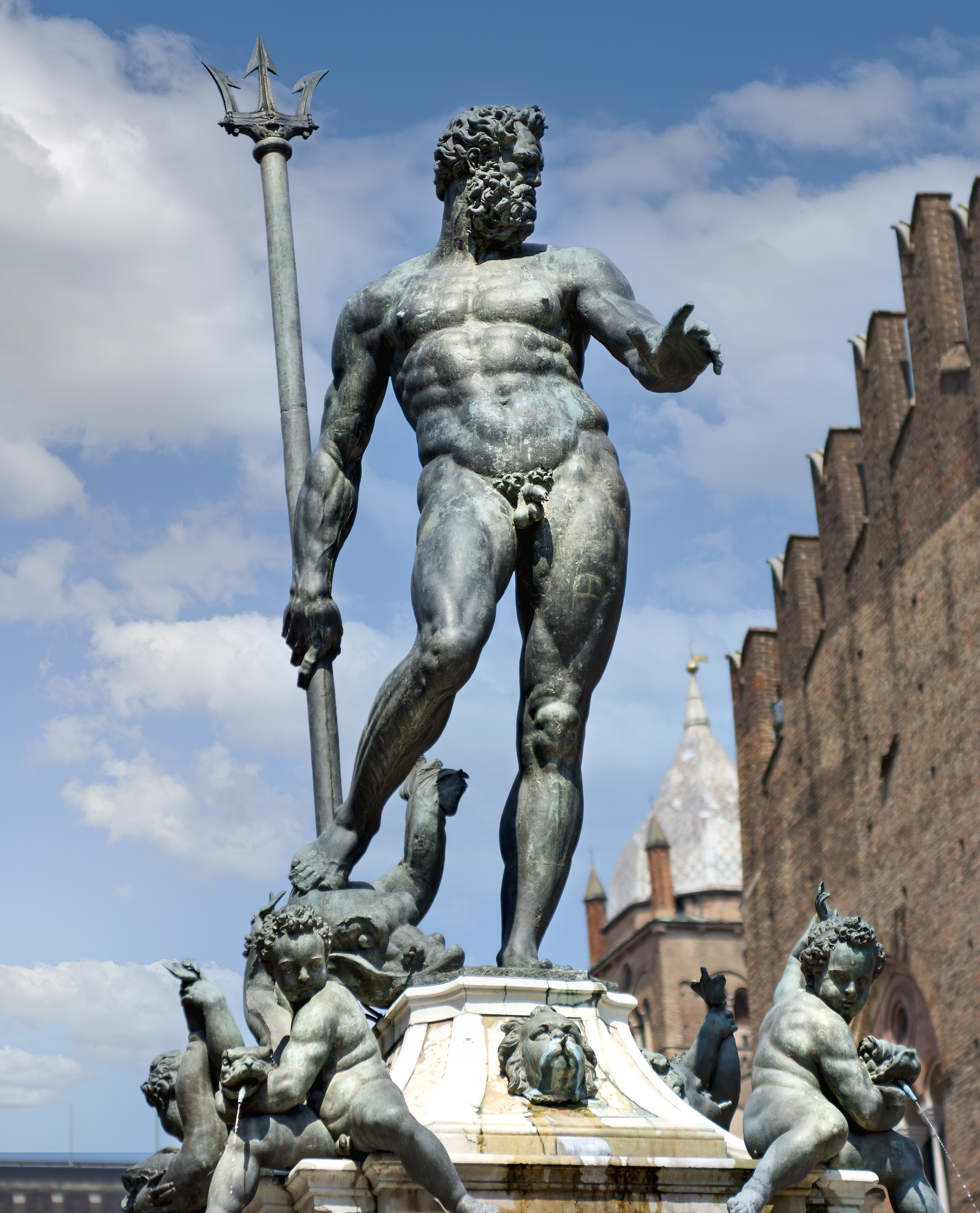
- Observed by: Roman Republic; Roman Empire
- Type: Classical Roman religion
- Celebrations: Games
- Date: 23 July

The Neptunalia was an obscure archaic two-day festival in honor of Neptune as god of waters, celebrated at Rome in the heat and drought of summer, probably 23 July (Varro, De lingua Latina vi.19). It was one of the dies comitiales, when committees of citizens could vote on civil or criminal matters. In the ancient calendar this day is marked as Nept. ludi et feriae, or Nept. ludi, from which Leonhard Schmitz (in Smith, see link) concluded that the festival was celebrated with games (ludi). Respecting the ceremonies of this festival nothing is known, except that the people used to build huts of branches and foliage (umbrae, according to Festus, under " Umbrae"), in which they probably feasted, drank, and amused themselves (Horace Carmina iii.28.1, &c.; Tertullian De Spectaculis ("On Celebrations") 6).

== In Tunisia ==
According to some, Neptunalia is still celebrated in the city of Sousse, Tunisia under the name Carnival of Awussu. The celebration transformed as time unfold and lost all religious connotations.

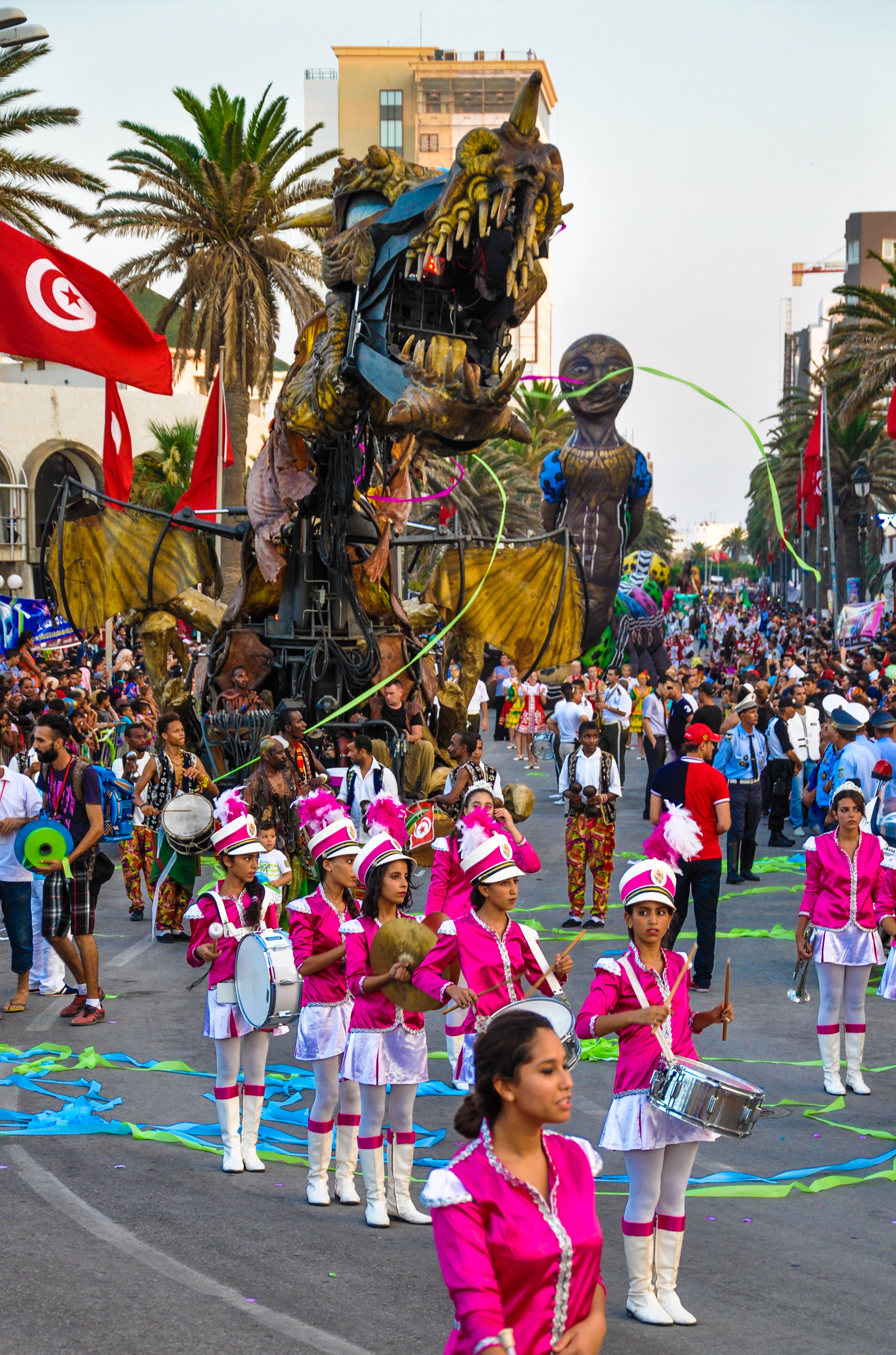
Awussu carnival parade, July 24, 2016
