= October Horse =

Animal sacrifice to Mars

In ancient Roman religion, the October Horse (Latin Equus October) was an animal sacrifice to Mars carried out on October 15, coinciding with the end of the agricultural and military campaigning season. The rite took place during one of three horse-racing festivals held in honor of Mars, the others being the two Equirria on February 27 and March 14.

Two-horse chariot races (bigae) were held in the Campus Martius, the area of Rome named for Mars, after which the right-hand horse of the winning team was transfixed by a spear, then sacrificed. The horse's head (caput) and tail (cauda) were cut off and used separately in the two subsequent parts of the ceremonies: two neighborhoods staged a fight for the right to display the head, and the freshly bloodied cauda was carried to the Regia for sprinkling the sacred hearth of Rome.

Ancient references to the Equus October are scattered over more than six centuries: the earliest is that of Timaeus (3rd century BC), who linked the sacrifice to the Trojan Horse and the Romans' claim to Trojan descent, with the latest in the Calendar of Philocalus (354 AD), where it is noted as still occurring, even as Christianity was becoming the dominant religion of the Empire. Most scholars see an Etruscan influence on the early formation of the ceremonies.

The October Horse is the only instance of horse sacrifice in Roman religion; the Romans typically sacrificed animals that were a normal part of their diet. The unusual ritual of the October Horse has thus been analyzed at times in light of other Indo-European forms of horse sacrifice, such as the Vedic ashvamedha and the Irish ritual described by Giraldus Cambrensis, both of which have to do with kingship. Although the ritual battle for possession of the head may preserve an element from the early period when Rome was ruled by kings, the October Horse's collocation of agriculture and war is characteristic of the Republic. The sacred topography of the rite and the role of Mars in other equestrian festivals also suggest aspects of youth initiation and rebirth ritual. The complex or even contradictory aspects of the October Horse probably result from overlays of traditions accumulated over time.

== Description ==
The rite of the October Horse took place on the Ides of October, but no name is recorded for a festival on that date. The grammarian Festus describes it as follows:

The October Horse is named from the annual sacrifice to Mars in the Campus Martius during the month of October. It is the right-hand horse of the winning team in the two-horse chariot races. The customary competition for its head between the residents of the Suburra and those of the Sacra Via was no trivial affair; the latter would get to attach it to the wall of the Regia, or the former to the Mamilian Tower. Its tail was transported to the Regia with sufficient speed that the blood from it could be dripped onto the hearth for the sake of becoming part of the sacred rite (res divina).

In a separate passage, the Augustan antiquarian Verrius Flaccus adds the detail that the horse's head is adorned with bread. The Calendar of Philocalus notes that on October 15 "the Horse takes place at the Nixae," either an altar to birth deities (di nixi) or less likely an obscure landmark called the Ciconiae Nixae. According to Roman tradition, the Campus Martius had been consecrated to Mars by their ancestors as horse pasturage and an equestrian training ground for youths.

The "sacred rite" that the horse's blood became part of is usually taken to be the Parilia, a festival of rural character on April 21, which became the date on which the founding of Rome was celebrated.

== War and agriculture ==
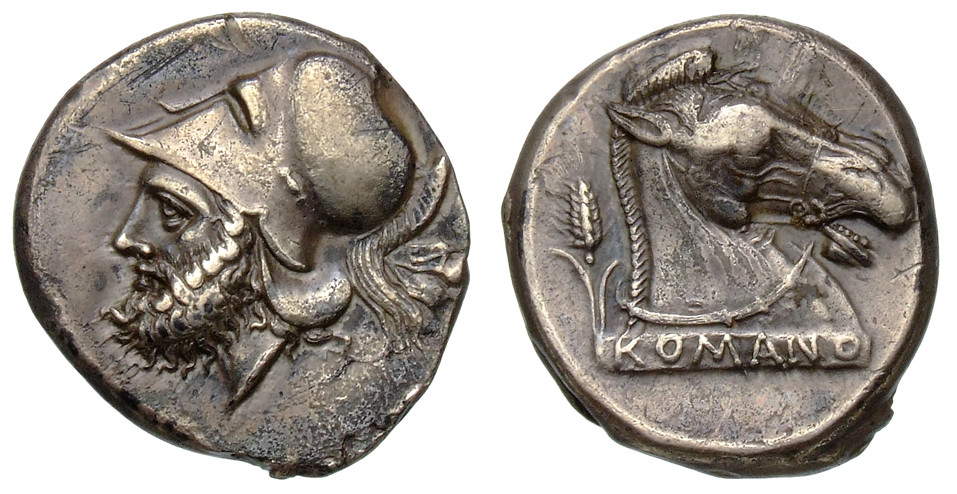
Coin with Mars and a bridled open-mouthed horse with an ear of grain (280–276 BC)

Verrius Flaccus notes that the horse ritual was carried out ob frugum eventum, usually taken to mean "in thanks for the completed harvest" or "for the sake of the next harvest", since winter wheat was sown in the fall. The phrase has been connected to the divine personification Bonus Eventus, "Good Outcome," who had a temple of unknown date in the Campus Martius and whom Varro lists as one of the twelve agricultural deities. But like other ceremonies in October, the sacrifice occurred during the time of the army's return and reintegration into society, for which Verrius also accounted by explaining that a horse is suited for war, an ox for tilling. The Romans did not use horses as draft animals for farm work, nor chariots in warfare, but Polybius specifies that the victim is a war horse.

The ritual was held outside the pomerium, Rome's sacred boundary, presumably because of its martial character. But agriculture was also an extra-urban activity, as Vitruvius indicates when he notes that the correct sacred place for Ceres was outside the city (extra urbem loco). In Rome's early history, the roles of soldier and farmer were complementary:

In early Rome agriculture and military activity were closely bound up, in the sense that the Roman farmer was also a soldier. … In the case of the October Horse, for example, we should not be trying to decide whether it is a military, or an agricultural festival; but see it rather as one of the ways in which the convergence of farming and warfare (or more accurately of farmers and fighters) might be expressed.

This polyvalence was characteristic of the god for whom the sacrifice was conducted, since among the Romans Mars brought war and bloodshed, agriculture and virility, and thus both death and fertility within his sphere of influence.

=== The Parilia and suffimen ===
The Augustan poets Propertius and Ovid both mention horse as an ingredient in the ritual preparation suffimen or suffimentum, which the Vestals compounded for use in the lustration of shepherds and their sheep at the Parilia. Propertius may imply that this horse was not an original part of the preparation: "the purification rites (lustra) are now renewed by means of the dismembered horse". Ovid specifies that the horse's blood was used for the suffimen. While the blood from the tail was dripped or smeared on the sacred hearth of Rome in October, blood or ashes from the rest of the animal could have been processed and preserved for the suffimen as well. Although no other horse sacrifice in Rome is recorded, Georges Dumézil and others have attempted to exclude the Equus October as the source of equine blood for the Parilia.

Another important ingredient for the suffimen was the ash produced from the holocaust of an unborn calf at the Fordicidia on April 15, along with the stalks from which beans had been harvested. One source, from late antiquity and not always reliable, notes that beans were sacred to Mars.

Suffimentum is a general word for a preparation used for healing, purification, or warding off ill influence. In his treatise on veterinary medicine, Vegetius recommends a suffimentum as an effective cure for draft animals and for humans prone to emotional outbursts, as well as for driving off hailstorms, demons and ghosts (daemones and umbras).

== The victim ==
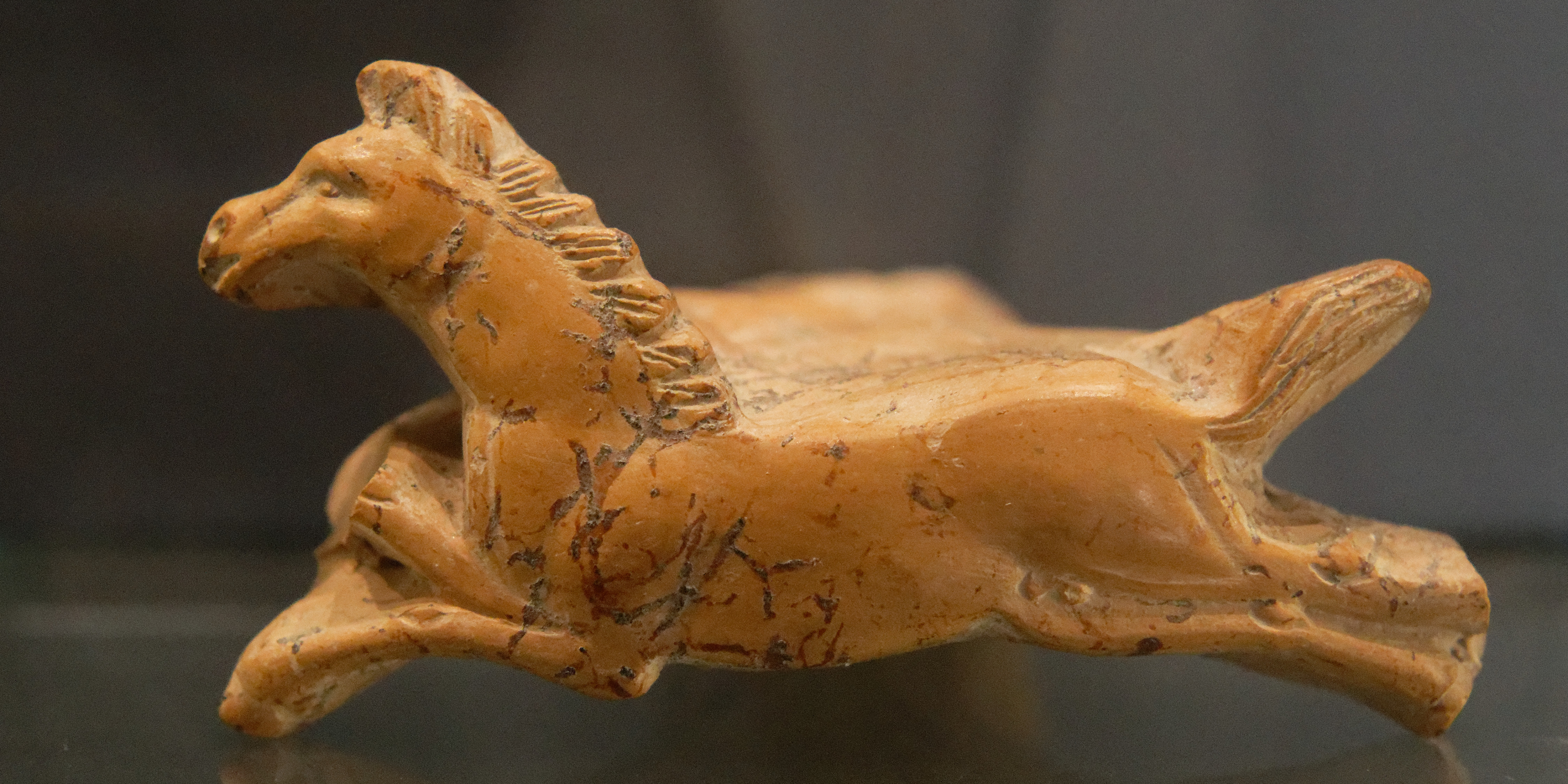
A terra sigillata stamp from Roman Gaul (Musée de la Céramique de Lezoux)

Sacrificial victims were most often domestic animals normally part of the Roman diet, and the meat was eaten at a banquet shared by those celebrating the rite. Horse meat was distasteful to the Romans, and Tacitus classes horses among "profane" animals. Inedible victims such as the October Horse and dogs were typically offered to chthonic deities in the form of a holocaust, resulting in no shared meal. In Greece, dog sacrifices were made to Mars' counterpart Ares and the related war god Enyalios. At Rome, dogs were sacrificed at the Robigalia, a festival for protecting the crops at which chariot races were held for Mars along with the namesake deity, and at a very few other public rites. Birth deities, however, also received offerings of puppies or bitches, and infant cemeteries show a high concentration of puppies, sometimes ritually dismembered. Inedible victims were offered to a restricted group of deities mainly involved with the cycle of birth and death, but the reasoning is obscure.

The importance of the horse to the war god is likewise not self-evident, since the Roman military was based on infantry. Mars' youthful armed priests the Salii, attired as "typical representatives of the archaic infantry," performed their rituals emphatically on foot, with dance steps. The equestrian order was of lesser social standing than the senatorial patres, "fathers", who were originally the patricians only. The Magister equitum, "Master of the Horse," was subordinate to the Dictator, who was forbidden the use of the horse except through special legislation. By the late Republic, the Roman cavalry was formed primarily from allies (auxilia), and Arrian emphasizes the foreign origin of cavalry training techniques, particularly among the Celts of Gaul and Spain. Roman technical terms pertaining to horsemanship and horse-drawn vehicles are mostly not Latin in origin, and often from Gaulish.

Under some circumstances, Roman religion placed the horse under an explicit ban. Horses were forbidden in the grove of Diana Nemorensis, and the patrician Flamen Dialis was religiously prohibited from riding a horse. Mars, however, was associated with horses at his Equirria festivals and the equestrian "Troy Game", which was one of the events Augustus staged for the dedication of the Temple of Mars Ultor in 2 BC.

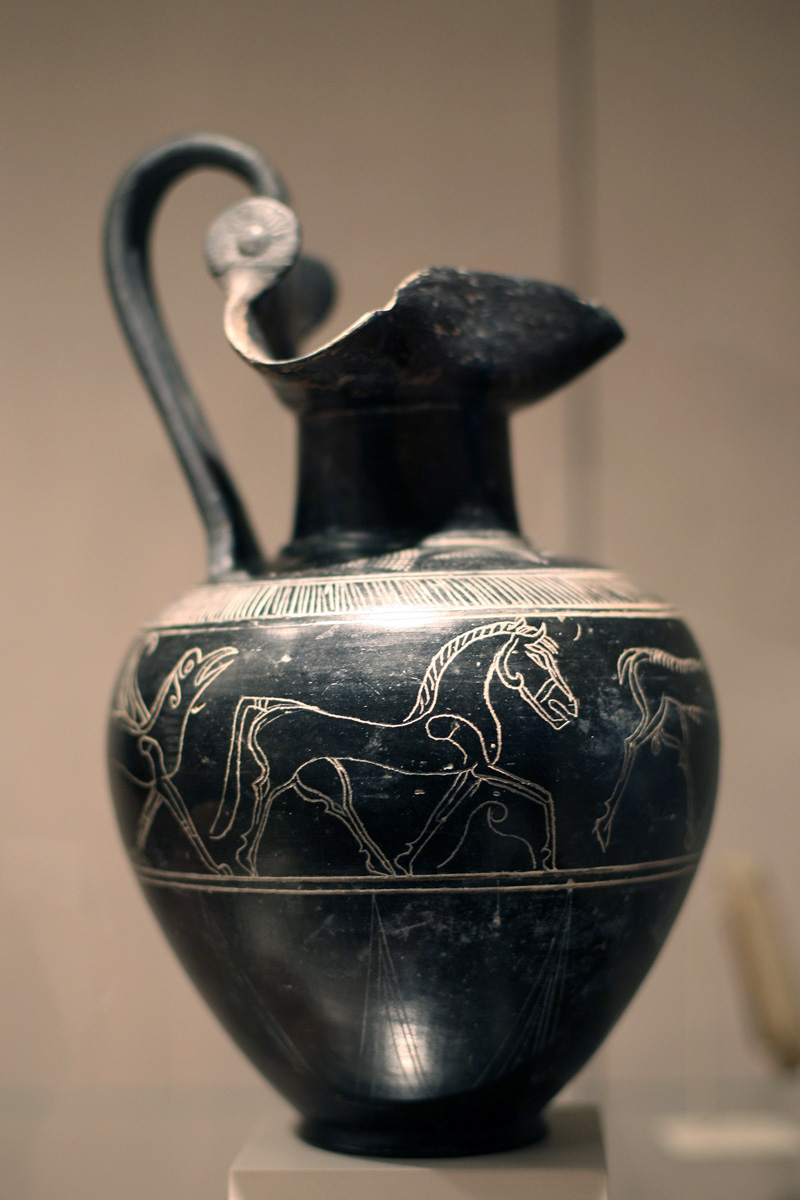
Horse on an Etruscan oinochoe

Horse sacrifice was regularly offered by peoples the Romans classified as "barbarians," such as Scythians, but also at times by Greeks. In Macedonia, "horses in armor" were sacrificed as a lustration for the army. Immediately after describing the October Horse, Festus gives three other examples: the Spartans sacrifice a horse "to the winds" on Mount Taygetus; among the Sallentini, horses were burnt alive for an obscure Jove Menzana; and every year the Rhodians dedicated a four-horse chariot (quadriga) to the Sun and cast it into the sea. The quadriga traditionally represented the sun, as the biga did the moon. A Persian horse-sacrifice to "Hyperion clothed in rays of light" was noted by Ovid and Greek sources.

In contrast to cultures that offered a horse to the war god in advance to ask for success, the Roman horse sacrifice marked the close of the military campaigning season. Among the Romans, horse- and chariot-races were characteristic of "old and obscure" religious observances such as the Consualia that at times propitiated chthonic deities. The horse races at the shadowy Taurian Games in honor of the underworld gods (di inferi) were held in the Campus Martius as were Mars' Equirria. The horse had been established as a funerary animal among the Greeks and Etruscans by the Archaic period. Hendrik Wagenvoort even speculated about an archaic form of Mars who "had been imagined as the god of death and the underworld in the shape of a horse."

=== The chariot ===
The two-horse chariot races (bigae) that preceded the October Horse sacrifice determined the selection of the optimal victim. In a dual yoke, the right-hand horse was the lead or strongest animal, and thus the one from the winning chariot was chosen as the most potent offering for Mars.

Chariots have a rich symbolism in Roman culture, but the Romans never used chariots in war, though they faced enemies who did. The chariot was part of Roman military culture primarily as the vehicle of the triumphing general, who rode in an ornamented four-horse car markedly impractical for actual war. Most Roman racing practices were of Etruscan origin, part of the Etruscan tradition of public games (ludi) and equestrian processions. Chariot racing was imported from Magna Graecia no earlier than the 6th century BC.

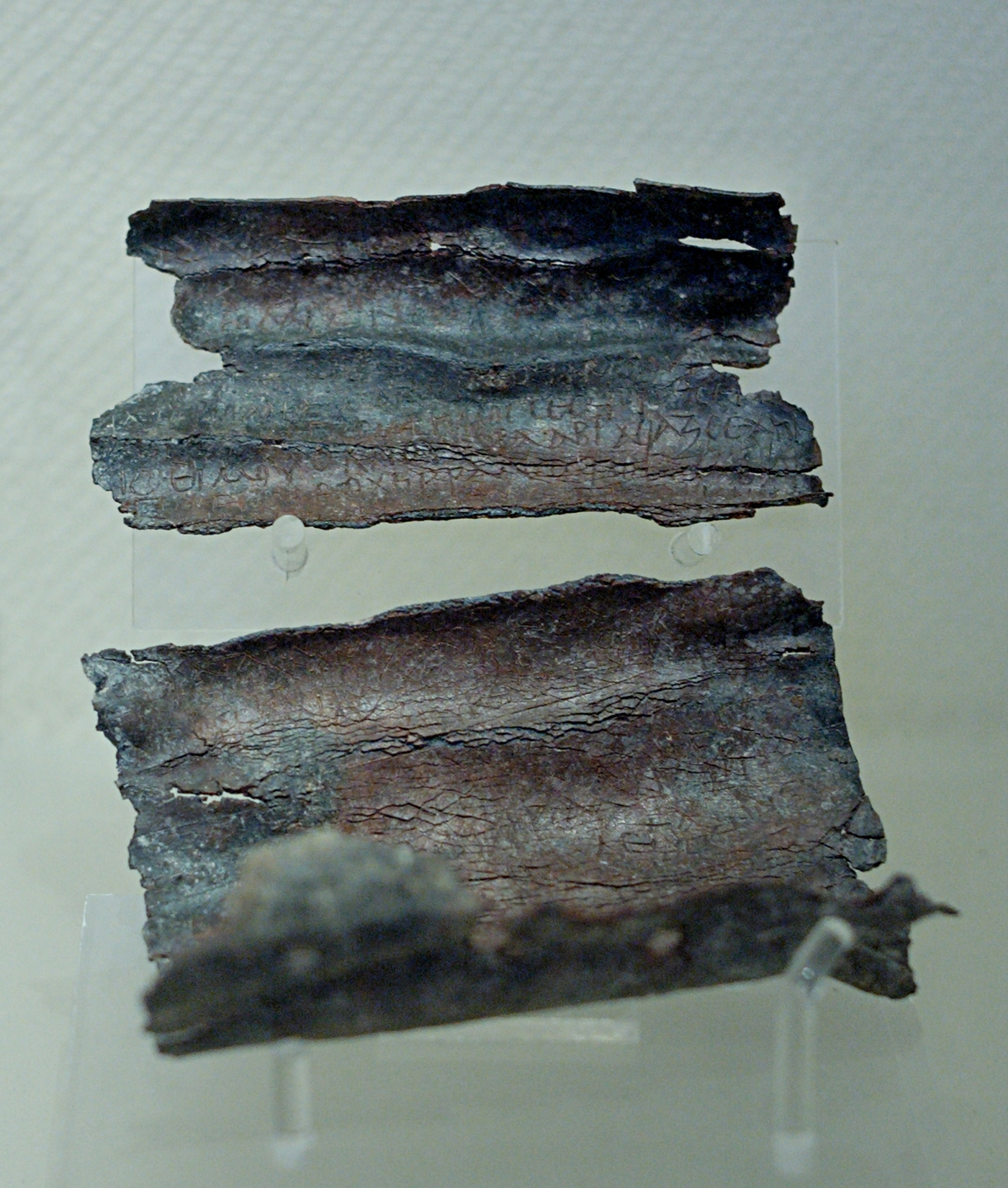
A curse tablet (defixio) aiming to affect the outcome of a chariot race (4th century), from the Via Appia, outside Porta San Sebastiano, Rome

Images of chariot races were considered good luck, but the races themselves were magnets for magic in attempts to influence the outcome. One law from the Theodosian Code, published in AD 438, prohibits charioteers from using magic to win, on pain of death. Some of the ornaments placed on horses were good-luck charms or devices to ward off malevolence, including bells, wolves' teeth, crescents, and brands. This counter-magic was directed at actual practices; binding spells (defixiones) have been found at race tracks. The defixio sometimes employed the spirits of the prematurely dead to work harm. On Greek racetracks, the turning posts were heroes' tombs or altars for propitiating malevolent spirits who might cause harm to the men or horses. The design of the turning posts (metae) on a Roman race course was derived from Etruscan funerary monuments.

Pliny attributes the invention of the two-horse chariot to the "Phrygians", an ethnic designation that the Romans came to regard as synonymous with "Trojan." In the Greek narrative tradition, chariots played a role in Homeric warfare, reflecting their importance among the historical Mycenaeans. By the time the Homeric epics were composed, however, fighting from chariot was no longer a part of Greek warfare, and the Iliad has warriors taking chariots as transportation to the battlefield, then fighting on foot. Chariot racing was a part of funeral games quite early, as the first reference to a chariot race in Western literature is as an event in the funeral games held for Patroclus in the Iliad. Perhaps the most famous scene from the Iliad involving a chariot is Achilles dragging the body of Hector, the Trojan heir to the throne, three times around the tomb of Patroclus; in the version of the Aeneid, it is the city walls that are circled. Variations of the scene occur throughout Roman funerary art.

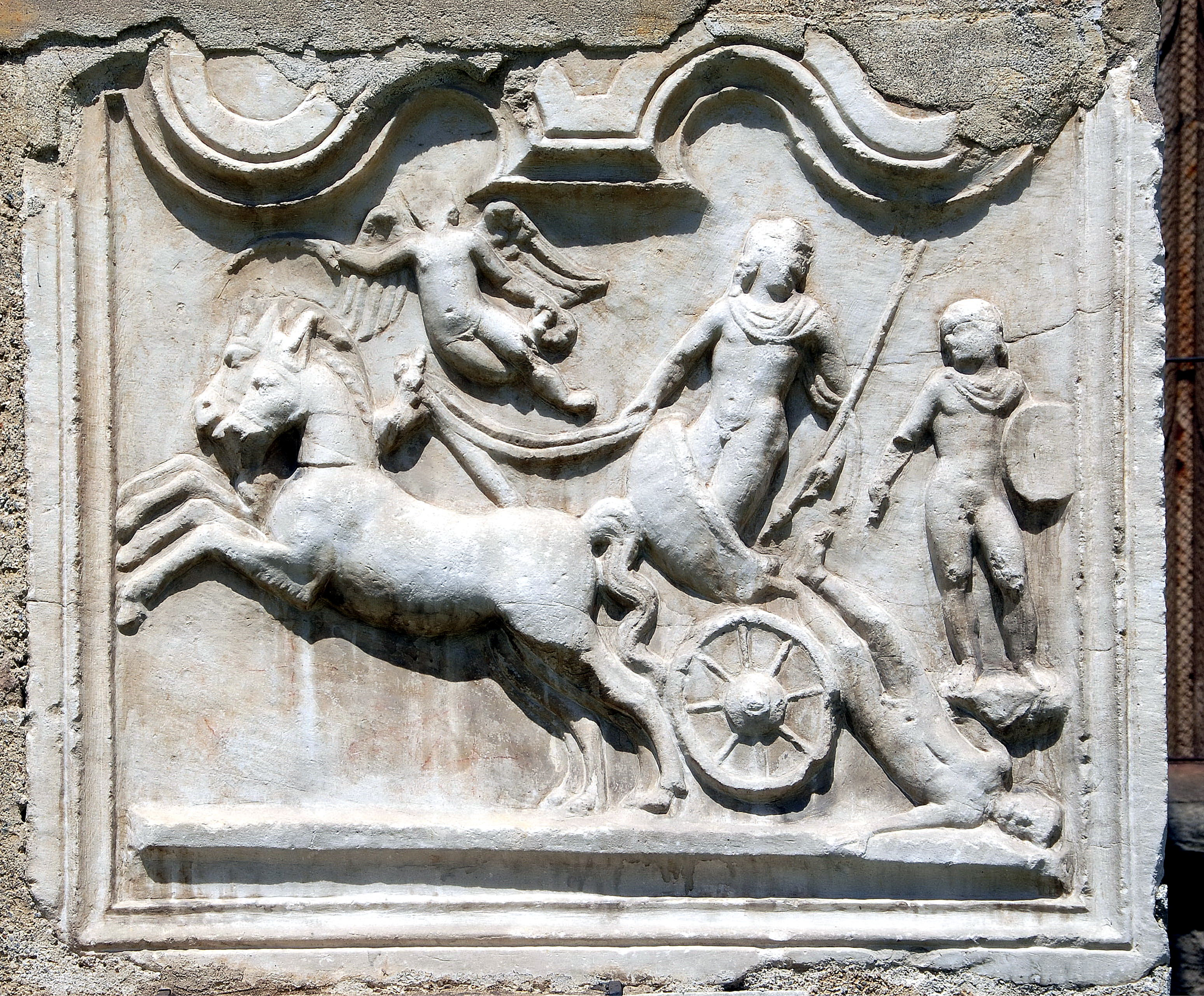
Imperial Roman funerary relief showing a spear-bearing Achilles in a lunate biga, dragging the body of Hector, with a winged figure above

Gregory Nagy sees horses and chariots, and particularly the chariot of Achilles, as embodying the concept of ménos, which he defines as "conscious life, power, consciousness, awareness," associated in the Homeric epics with thūmós, "spiritedness," and psychē, "soul," all of which depart the body in death. The gods endow both heroes and horses with ménos through breathing into them, so that "warriors eager for battle are literally 'snorting with ménos.'" A metaphor at Iliad 5.296 compares a man falling in battle to horses collapsing when they are unharnessed after exertions. Cremation frees the psychē from both thūmós and ménos so that it may pass into the afterlife; the horse, which embodies ménos, races off and leaves the chariot behind, as in the philosophical allegory of the chariot from Plato. The anthropological term mana has sometimes been borrowed to conceptualize the October Horse's potency, also expressed in modern scholarship as numen. The physical exertions of the hard-breathing horse in its contest are thought to intensify or concentrate this mana or numen.

In honoring the god who presided over the Roman census, which among other functions registered the eligibility of young men for military service, the festivals of Mars have a strongly lustral character. A lustration was performed in the Campus Martius following the census. Although lustral ceremonies are not recorded as occurring before the chariot races of the Equirria or the October Horse, it is plausible that they were, and that they were seen as a test or assurance of the lustration's efficacy.

=== The head ===
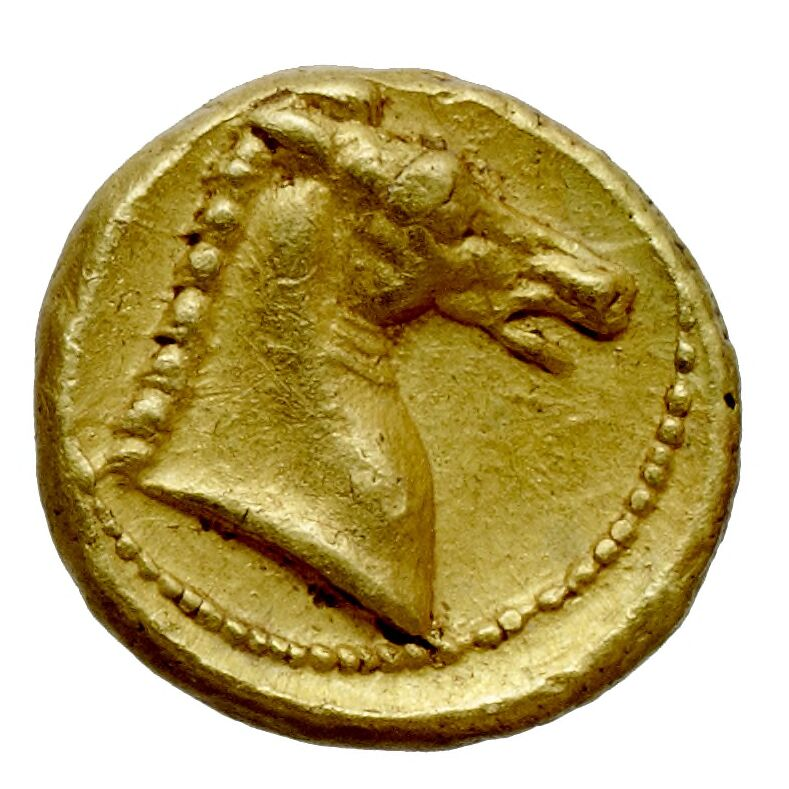
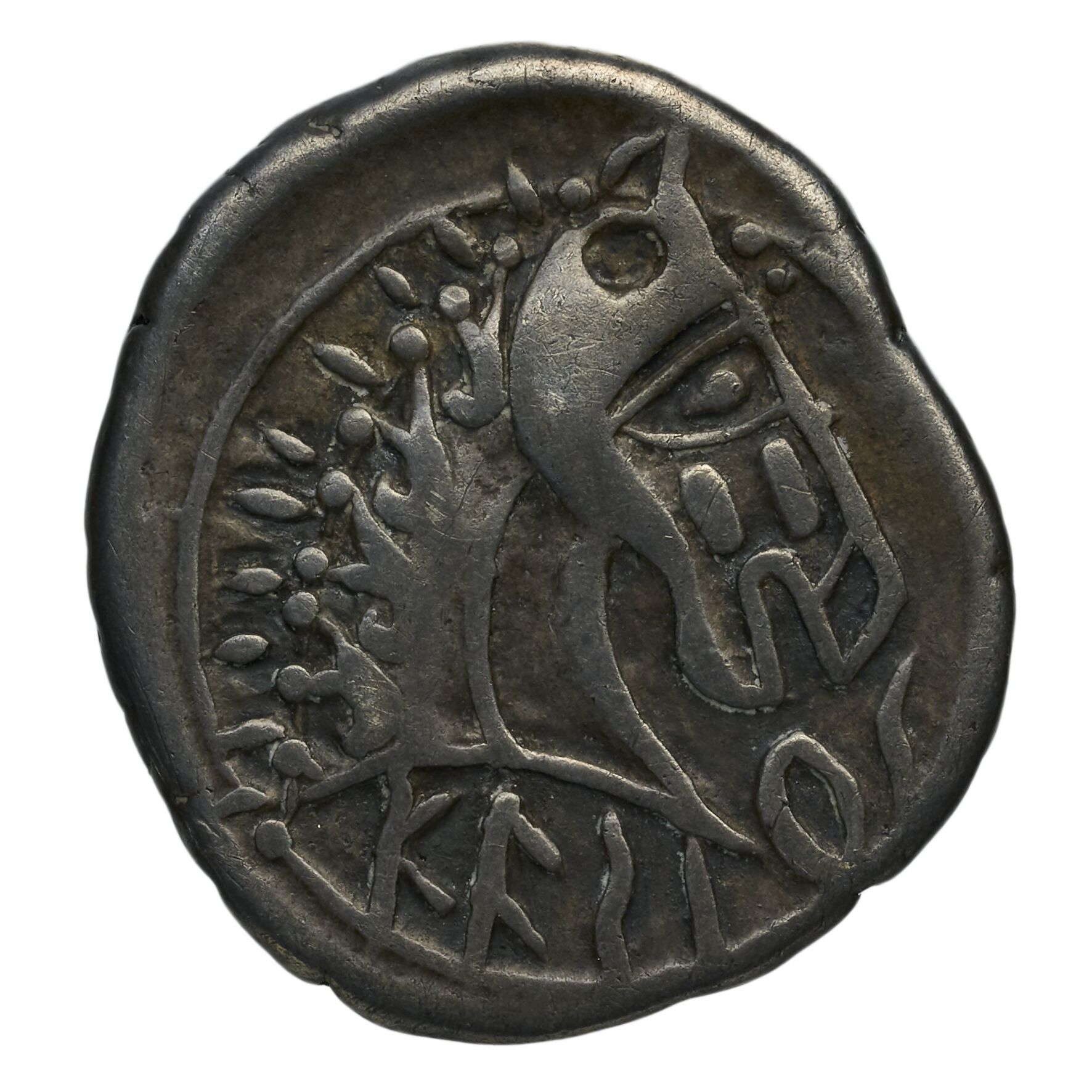
A horse's head is a recurring image on Carthaginian coinage (L, electrum 1/10th stater). Horses may be the most common image on the reverse of Gallic coins, but the head alone is found mainly among the Allobroges (R, silver), who were integrated into Gallia Transalpina in the 1st century BC.

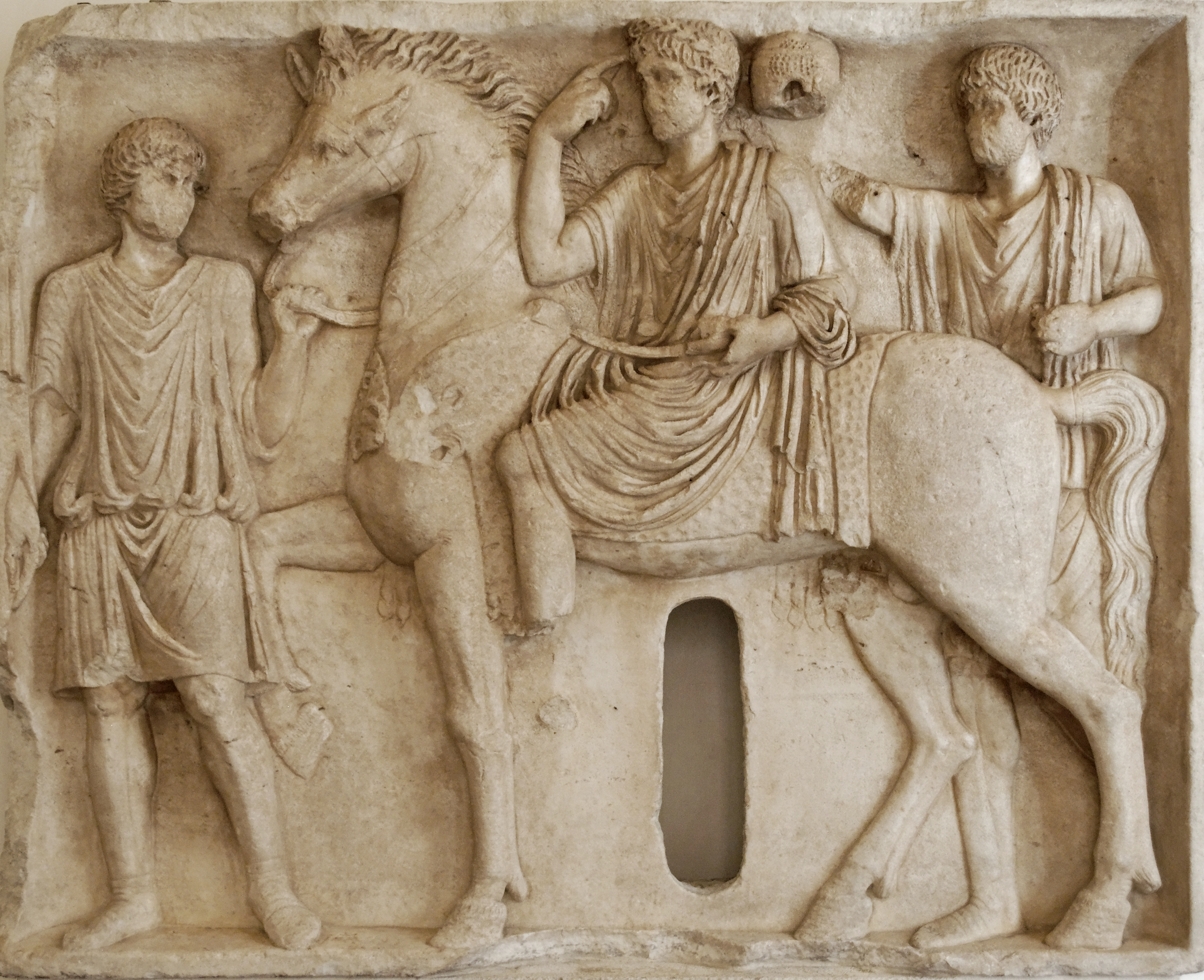
Funerary relief depicting the deceased riding a horse and pointing to his head where the Genius resides (2nd century AD)

The significance of the October Horse's head as a powerful trophy may be illuminated by the caput acris equi, "head of a spirited ('sharp') horse," which Vergil says was uncovered by Dido and her colonists when they began the dig to found Carthage: "by this sign it was shown that the race (gens) would be distinguished in war and abound with the means of life." The 4th-century agricultural writer Palladius advised farmers to place the skull of a horse or ass on their land; the animals were not to be "virgin," because the purpose was to promote fertility. The practice may be related to the effigies known as oscilla, figures or faces that Vergil says were hung from pine trees by mask-wearing Ausonian farmers of Trojan descent when they were sowing seed.

The location of sexual vitality or fertility in the horse's head suggests its talismanic potency. The substance hippomanes, which was thought to induce sexual passion, was supposedly exuded from the forehead of a foal; Aelian (ca. 175–235 AD) says either the forehead or "loins." Called amor by Vergil, it is an ingredient in Dido's ritual preparations before her suicide in the Aeneid.

On Roman funerary reliefs, the deceased is often depicted riding on a horse for his journey to the afterlife, sometimes pointing to his head. This gesture signifies the Genius, the divine embodiment of the vital principle found in each individual conceived of as residing in the head, in some ways comparable to the Homeric thumos or the Latin numen.

==== Bread pendants ====
Pendants of bread were attached to the head of the Equus October: a portion of the inedible sacrifice was retained for humans and garnished with an everyday food associated with Ceres and Vesta. The shape of the "breads" is not recorded. Equines decorated with bread are found also on the Feast of Vesta on June 9, when the asses who normally worked in the milling and baking industry were dressed with garlands from which decorative loaves dangled. According to Ovid, the ass was honored at the Vestalia as a reward for its service to the Virgin Mother, who is portrayed in Augustan ideology as simultaneously native and Trojan. When the ithyphallic god Priapus, an imported deity who was never the recipient of public cult, was about to rape Vesta as she slept, the braying ass woke her. In revenge, Priapus thereafter demanded the ass as a customary sacrifice to him. The early Christian writer Lactantius says that the garland of bread pendants commemorates the preservation of Vesta's sexual integrity (pudicitia). Aelian recounts a myth in which the ass misplaces a pharmakon entrusted to him by the king of the gods, thereby causing humanity to lose its eternal youth.

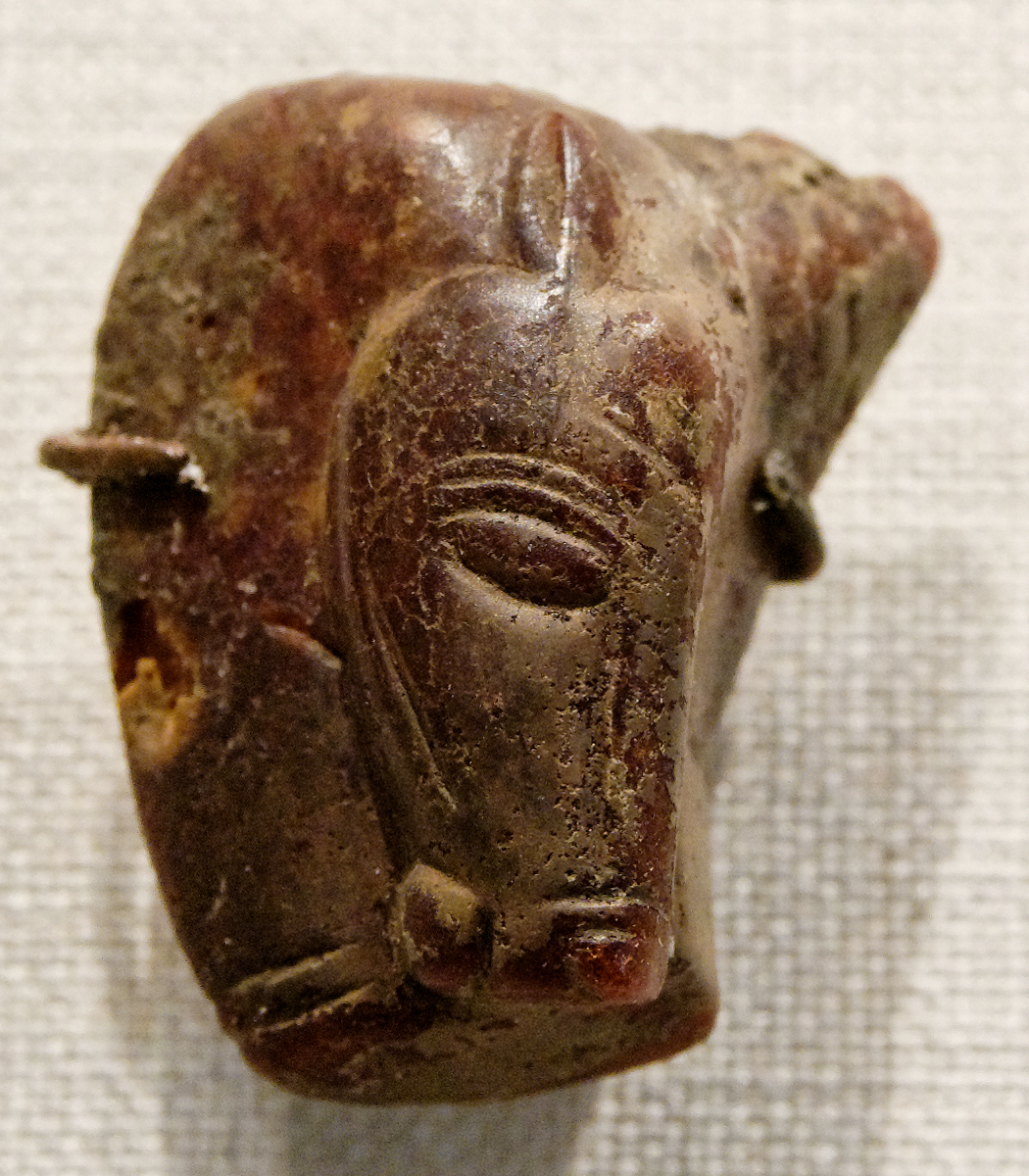
Horse head pendant in amber (Italic, 5th century BC)

The symbolism of bread for the October Horse is unstated in the ancient sources. Robert Turcan has seen the garland of loaves as a way to thank Mars for protecting the harvest. Mars was linked to Vesta, the Regia, and the production of grain through several religious observances. In his poem on the calendar, Ovid thematically connects bread and war throughout the month of June (Iunius, a name for which Ovid offers multiple derivations including Juno and "youths", iuniores). Immediately following the story of Vesta, Priapus, and the ass, Ovid associates Vesta, Mars, and bread in recounting the Gallic siege of Rome. The Gauls were camped in the Field of Mars, and the Romans had taken to their last retreat, the Capitoline citadel. At an emergency council of the gods, Mars objects to the removal of the sacred talismans of Trojan Vesta which guarantee the safety of the state, and is indignant that the Romans, destined to rule the world, are starving. Vesta causes flour to materialize, and the process of breadmaking occurs miraculously during the night, resulting in an abundance (ops) of the gifts of Ceres. Jupiter wakes the sleeping generals and delivers an oracular message: they are to throw that which they least want to surrender from the citadel onto the enemy. Puzzled at first, as is conventional in receiving an oracle, the Romans then throw down the loaves of bread as weapons against the shields and helmets of the Gauls, causing the enemy to despair of starving Rome into submission.

J.G. Frazer pointed to a similar throwing away of food abundance as a background to the October Horse, which he saw as the embodiment of the "corn spirit". According to tradition, the fields consecrated to Mars had been appropriated by the Etruscan king Tarquinius Superbus for his private use. Accumulated acts of arrogance among the royal family led to the expulsion of the king. The overthrow of the monarchy occurred at harvest time, and the grain from the Campus Martius had already been gathered for threshing. Even though the tyrant's other property had been seized and redistributed among the people, the consuls declared that the harvest was under religious prohibition. In recognition of the new political liberty, a vote was taken on the matter, after which the grain and chaff were willingly thrown into the Tiber river. Frazer saw the October Horse as a harvest festival in origin, because it took place on the king's farmland in the autumn. Since no source accounts for what happens to the horse apart from the head and tail, it is possible that it was reduced to ash and disposed of in the same manner as Tarquin's grain.

=== The tail ===
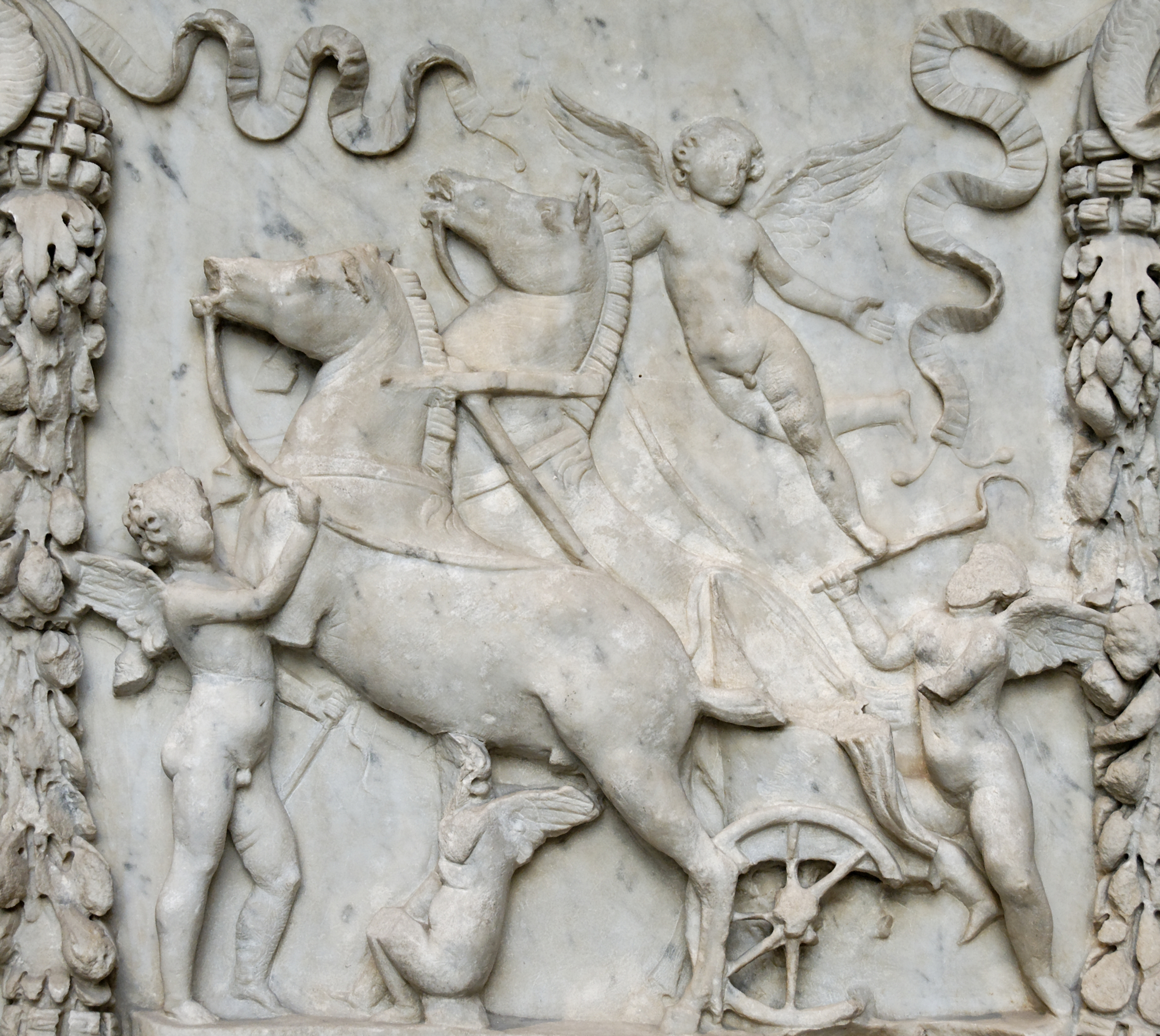
Cupids and a biga, relief panel from a Trajanic Altar of Venus and Mars, later rededicated to Silvanus

George Devereux and others have argued that cauda, or οὐρά (oura) in Greek sources, is a euphemism for the penis of the October Horse, which might be expected to contain more blood to drip on the hearth at the Regia towards the preparation of the suffimen. However, the tail itself was a magico-religious symbol of fertility or power, and in 1974, at the request of Georges Dumézil, a vétérinaire-inspecteur from the Veterinary Services of Paris carried out a horse-slaughter experiment to demonstrate that blood from a severed horse's tail may drip or ooze about three minutes – a timeframe within which a good runner could reach the Regia but with the potential for an unlucky or poorly performing runner to fail ominously.

A phallic-like potency may be attributed to the October Horse's tail without requiring cauda to mean "penis," since the ubiquity of phallic symbols in Roman culture would make euphemism or substitution unnecessary. The practice of attaching a horse's tail to a helmet may originate in a desire to appropriate the animal's power in battle; in the Iliad, Hector's horse-crested helmet is a terrifying sight. In the iconography of the Mithraic mysteries, the tail of the sacrificial bull is often grasped, as is the horse's tail in depictions of the Thracian Rider god, as if to possess its power. A pinax from Corinth depicts a dwarf holding his phallus with both hands while standing on the tail of a stallion carrying a rider; although the dwarf has sometimes been interpreted as the horse-threatening Taraxippus, the phallus is more typically an apotropaic talisman (fascinum) to ward off malevolence.

Satyrs and sileni, though later characterized as goat-like, in the Archaic period were regularly depicted with equine features, including a prominent horsetail; they were known for uncontrolled sexuality, and are often ithyphallic in art. Satyrs are first recorded in Roman culture as part of ludi, appearing in the preliminary parade (pompa circensis) of the first Roman Games. The tail of the wolf, an animal regularly associated with Mars, was said by Pliny to contain amatorium virus, aphrodisiac power. Dumézil rejected any phallic significance for the tail.

==== Tail docking as insult ====
Plutarch relates that at the conclusion of the Sicilian Expedition (413 BC), among the many humiliations inflicted by the victorious Syracusans on the Athenians was chopping off the manes and tails of their horses:

"The public prisoners were collected together, the fairest and tallest trees along the river bank were hung with the captured suits of armour, and then the victors crowned themselves with wreaths, adorned their own horses splendidly while they sheared and cropped the horses of their conquered foes."

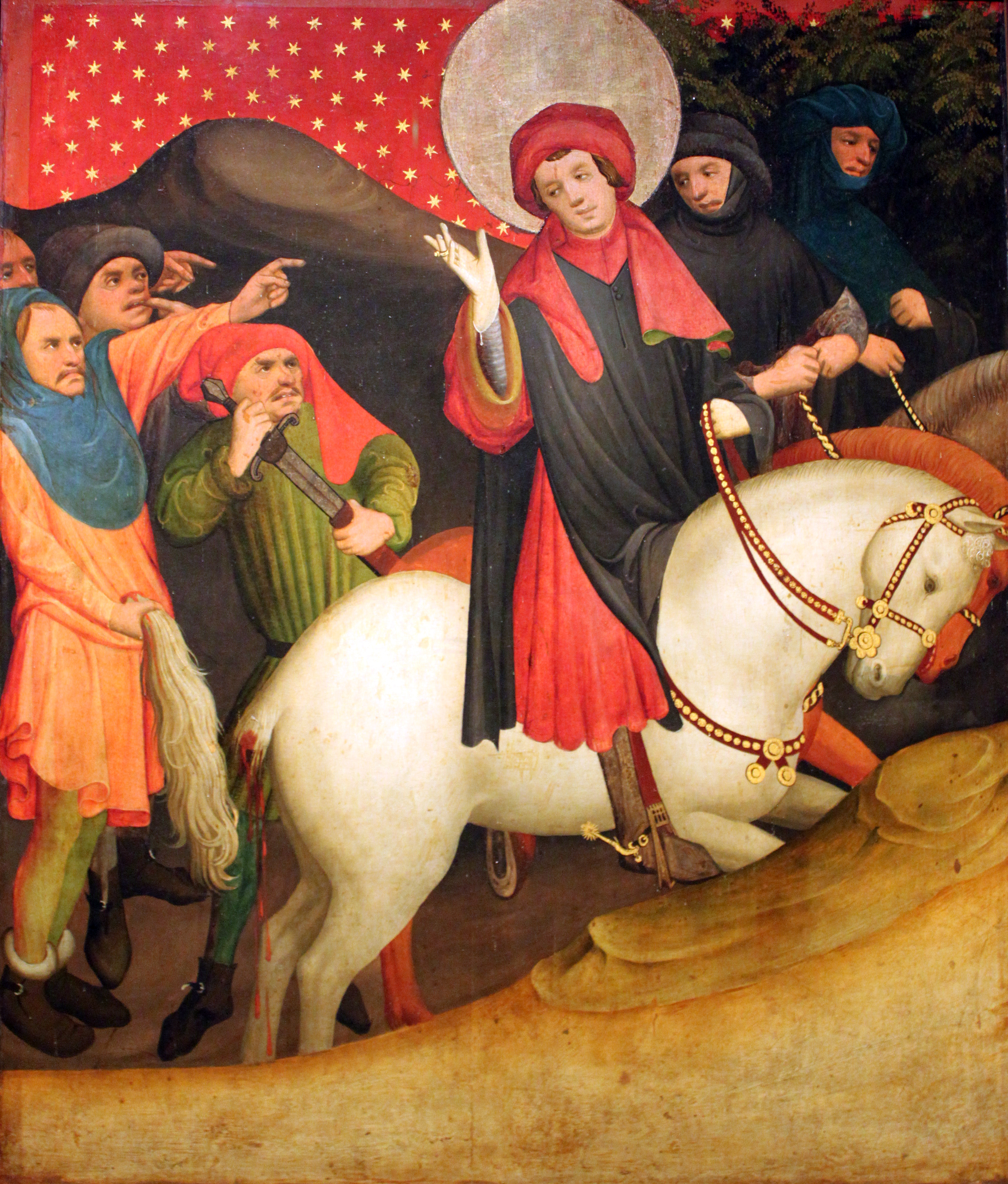
The Mocking of Saint Thomas of Canterbury from the 1426 altarpiece by Master Francke

The October Horse sacrifice is part of a complex of meanings surrounding equine mutilation in Europe. It appears notably in the medieval Welsh narrative of Branwen when Efnisien, one of a set of twins, mutilates the horses of the King of Ireland, including cutting "their tails to their backs." A similar act of horse disfigurement as an insult occurs in the Old Icelandic saga of Hrólf Kraki.

In the medieval period, the actual docking of the tail of a knight's horse carried a message of emasculation, defamation, and domination. Dozens of such mutilations are recorded in medieval England after the practice was brought in by the Normans. Tail mutilation was carried out frequently enough that it was criminalized and penalties were set in early medieval Germanic, Scandinavian, and Welsh law. As an indication that the horse tail represented or was associated with the penis, a 13th-century English law condemned a rapist not only to lose his life and limbs but also to have both the genitals and the tail of his horse cut off.

In one of the most striking incidents, on Christmas Eve 1170, four days before Thomas Becket was martyred, an enemy cut off the tail of one of his horses and taunted him with it as a threat. On the Becket altarpiece of Hamburg, one of two known medieval depictions of the scene, the mutilator makes a phallic gesture with the horse's tail. A legend then arose that the descendants of the perpetrator grew tails and earned the insulting nickname caudati, the "tailed ones," which spread to attach itself to all Kentishmen; Greek-speaking Sicilians hurled the insult at the English generally in an incident during Richard the First's crusade (1198–92).

Equine mutilation as a form of insult survived into the early modern era. At Somerset in 1611, a horse was paraded in a skimmington ride, a form of public mockery usually aimed at a sexual offense or adultery. On this occasion, horns were attached to the animal's head, indicating cuckolding, and its ears and the hair of its mane and tail were cut off. The horse, in an instance of transferred epithet, is said to be thus disgraced.

=== The Trojan Horse ===
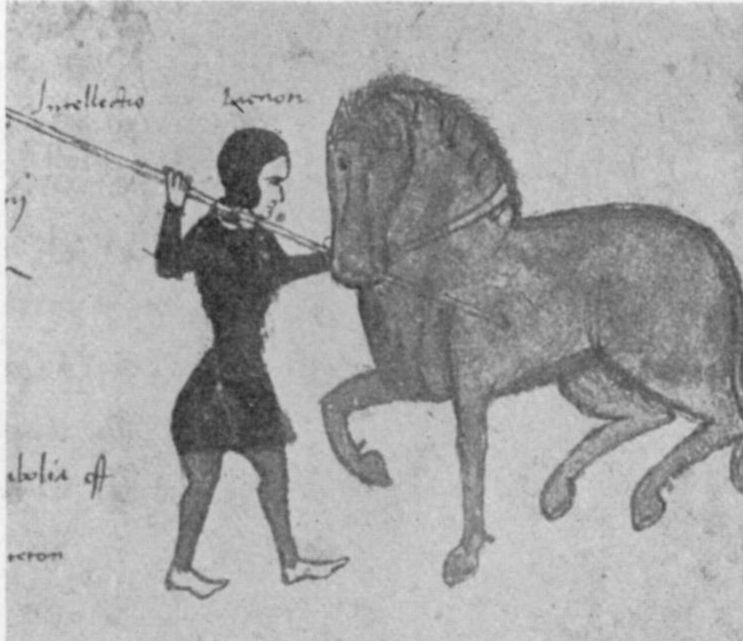
Laocoon spearing the Trojan Horse (Codex Vaticanus lat. 2761)

Timaeus (3rd century BC) attempted to explain the ritual of the October Horse in connection with the Trojan Horse—an attempt mostly regarded by ancient and modern scholars as "hardly convincing." As recorded by Polybius (2nd century BC),

he tells us that the Romans still commemorate the disaster at Troy by shooting (κατακοντίζειν, "to spear down") on a certain day a war-horse before the city in the Campus Martius, because the capture of Troy was due to the wooden horse — a most childish statement. For at that rate we should have to say that all barbarian tribes were descendants of the Trojans, since nearly all of them, or at least the majority, when they are entering on a war or on the eve of a decisive battle sacrifice a horse, divining the issue from the manner in which it falls. Timaeus in dealing with the foolish practice seems to me to exhibit not only ignorance but pedantry in supposing that in sacrificing a horse they do so because Troy was said to have been taken by means of a horse.

Plutarch (d. 120 AD) also offers a Trojan origin as a possibility, noting that the Romans claimed to have descended from the Trojans and would want to punish the horse that betrayed the city. Festus said that this was a common belief, but rejects it on the same grounds as Polybius.

Mars and a horse's head appear on opposite sides of the earliest Roman didrachm, introduced during the Pyrrhic War, which was the subject of Timaeus's book. Michael Crawford attributes Timaeus's interest in the October Horse to the appearance of this coinage in conjunction with the war.

Walter Burkert has suggested that while the October Horse cannot be taken as a sacrificial reenactment against the Trojan Horse, there may be some shared ritualistic origin. The Trojan Horse succeeded as a stratagem because the Trojans accepted its validity as a votive offering or dedication to a deity, and they wanted to transfer that power within their own walls. The spear that the Trojan priest Laocoön drives into the side of the wooden horse is paralleled by the spear used by the officiating priest at the October sacrifice.

== Spear and officiant ==
Timaeus, who interpreted the October Horse in light of Rome's claim to Trojan origins, is both the earliest source and the only one that specifies a spear as the sacrificial implement. The spear was an attribute of Mars in the way that Jupiter wielded the thunderbolt or Neptune the trident. The spear of Mars was kept in the Regia, the destination of the October Horse's tail. Sacrificial victims were normally felled with a mallet and securis (sacrificial axe), and other implements would have been necessary for dismembering the horse. A spear was used against the bull in a taurobolium, perhaps as a remnant of the ritual's origin as a hunt, but otherwise it is a sacrificial oddity.

Because the sacrifice took place in the Campus Martius, during a religious festival celebrated for Mars, it is often assumed that the Flamen Martialis presided. This priest of Mars may have wielded a spear ritually on other occasions, but no source names the officiant over the October Horse rite.

== On the calendar ==
The Equus October occurred on the Ides of October. All Ides were sacred to Jupiter. Here as at a few other points in the calendar, a day sacred to Mars doubles up with that of another god. The Equus preceded the Armilustrium ("Purification of Arms") on October 19. Although most of Mars' festivals cluster in his namesake month of March (Martius), ceremonies pertaining to Mars in October are seen as concluding the season in which he was most active.

André Dacier, an early editor of Festus, noted in regard to the October Horse the tradition that Troy had fallen in October. The October Horse figured in the elaborate efforts of the 19th-century chronologist Edward Greswell to ascertain the date of that event. Greswell assumed that the Equus October commemorated the date Troy fell, and after accounting for adjustments to the original Roman calendar as a result of the Julian reform, arrived at October 19, 1181 BC.

The festival diametrically opposed to the October Horse on the calendar was the Fordicidia on the Ides of April. The two festivals were divided by six lunations, with a near-perfect symmetry of days (177 and 178) between them in the two halves of the year. The peculiar sacrifice of unborn calves on the Fordicidia provided the other animal ingredient for the suffimen of the Parilia on April 21.

Plutarch places the horse sacrifice on the Ides of December, presumably because it occurred in the tenth month, which in the original Roman calendar was December instead of October, as indicated by the month's name (from decem, "ten").

== Topography ==
Most religious events at Rome were set in a single place, or held simultaneously in multiple locations, such as neighborhoods or private households. But like the ritual of the Argei, the October Horse links several sites within Roman religious topography. The mapping of sites may be part of the ritual's meaning, accumulated in layers over time.

The chariot races and sacrifice take place in the Campus Martius, formerly ager Tarquiniorum, Tarquin land, an alluvial plain along the Tiber that was outside the pomerium, Rome's sacred boundary. Religious rituals involving war, agriculture, and death are regularly held outside the pomerium. The race seems to have been staged with temporary facilities on the Trigarium, near the Tarentum, the precinct within which the Altar of Dis and Proserpina was located. Father Dis was the Roman equivalent of the Greek Plouton (Pluto), and his consort Proserpina (Persephone) embodied the vegetative cycle of growth symbolizing the course of the human soul through birth, death, and rebirth into the afterlife, over which the couple presided in the mysteries. The cult may have been imported to Rome when the Saecular Games were instituted in 249 BC.

=== Ad Nixas ===
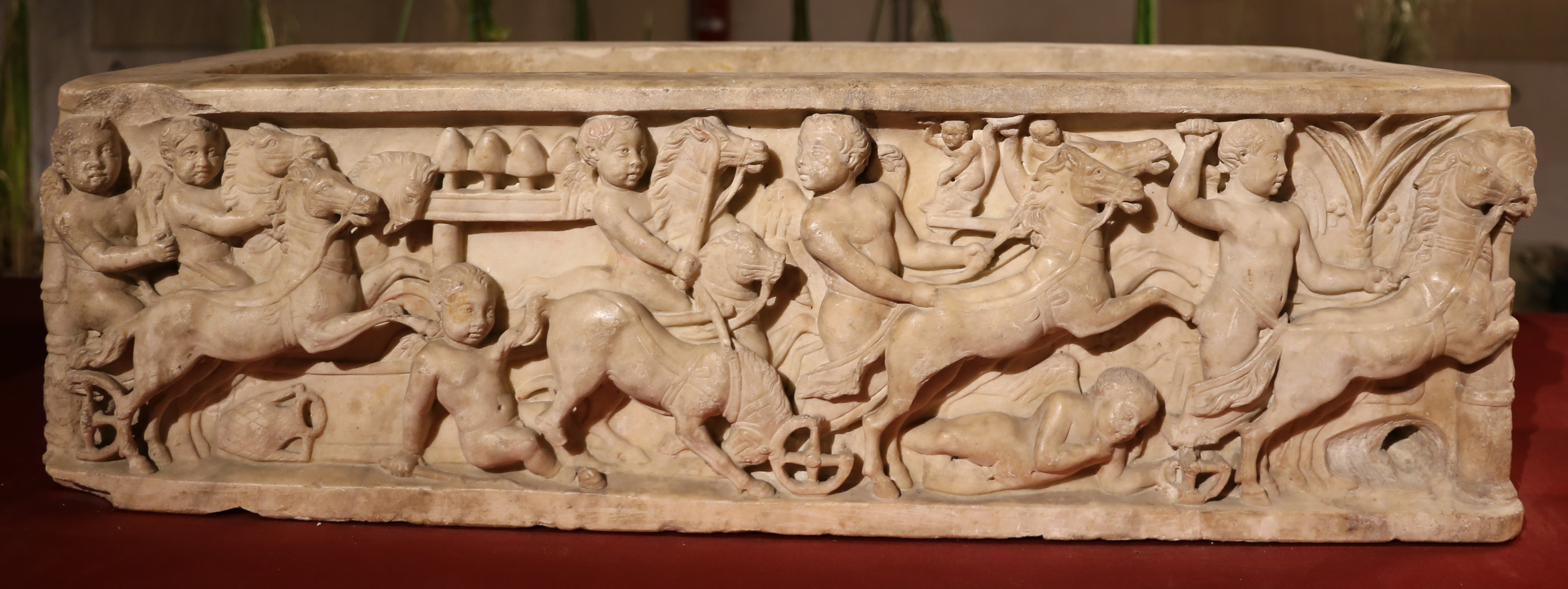
Child's sarcophagus (2nd century AD) depicting boyish Cupids driving bigae at the circus

The sacrifice itself took place within the Tarentum precinct "at the Nixae" (ad Nixas), probably an altar to the deities of birth (di nixi), who were invoked as Ilithyis. In 17 BC, these deities received a nocturnal sacrifice at the Saecular Games, which originated at the site as the ludi tarentini. According to Festus, the ludi tarentini were instituted in honor of Mars under Tarquinius Superbus, the Etruscan last king of Rome. Birth deities appear both in the epigraphic record of the 17 BC games and prominently in Horace's Carmen Saeculare, composed for the occasion and performed by a children's choir: "In accordance with rite, open up full-term births, Ilithyia: watch over mothers and keep them calm, whether you are best called Lucina or Genitalis".

The October Horse sacrifice for Mars at an altar for birth deities suggests his role as a patron to young warriors who undergo the symbolic rebirth of initiation ritual, a theme also of the equestrian Troy Game. The emperor Julian mentions the sacrifice of a horse in Roman initiation rites, without specifying further. The Campus Martius continued in the Imperial era to be a place for equestrian and military training for youth. The Temple of Mars Ultor dedicated in 2 BC by Augustus in the Campus became the site at which young men sacrificed to conclude their rite of passage into adulthood when assuming the toga virilis ("man's toga") around age 14. To prove themselves, younger, less experienced drivers usually started out with the two-horse chariots that were used in the October Horse race.

Roman rituals of birth and death were closely related, given the high rate of infant mortality and death in childbirth. Chariot races are the most common scene depicted on the sarcophagi of Roman children, and typically show Cupids driving bigae. The Taurian Games, horse races held in the Campus Martius to propitiate gods of the underworld (di inferi), were instituted in response to an epidemic of infant mortality.

Some scholars think Roman conceptions of Mars were influenced by the Etruscan child-god Maris and the centaur Mares, ancestor of the Ausones. Maris is depicted with a cauldron symbolizing rebirth, and the half-man, half-horse Mares three times underwent death and rebirth. In association with Etruscan-influenced horse-racing festivals, John F. Hall saw Mars as a god having "power over death."

Ad Nixas may, however, refer to a landmark called the Ciconiae Nixae ("Travailing Storks"), which did not exist during the Republican period. In that case, the original site for the sacrifice was likely to have been the Altar of Mars (Ara Martis) in the Campus Martius, the oldest center in Rome for the cultivation of Mars as a deity.

=== Ritual bifurcation ===
The dismemberment of the horse led to a ritual bifurcation into ceremonies involving the head and tail separately. The tail was speedily transported by foot to the Regia. The route would have crossed east of the center of the Campus Martius, and along the outside of the Servian Wall to the Porta Fontinalis (in present-day Rome, to the northeast of the Altare della Patria). A monumental portico built in 193 BC connected the Porta Fontinalis to the Altar of Mars in the Campus. Once within the walls, the route would have followed the Clivus Lautumiarum up to the Comitium, then along the Via Sacra to the Regia, for about a mile. The blood from the tail was then dripped or smeared onto the sacred hearth. This collocation of divine functions recalls the annual renewal of the fire of Vesta on March 1, the "birthday" of Mars, when laurel was hung on the Regia and New Year's Day originally was celebrated on the archaic Roman calendar.

The head became the object of contention between two factions, residents of the Via Sacra and of the Subura. The battle decided where the head would be displayed for the coming year. If the Suburan faction won, it would be mounted in their neighborhood on the Tower of the Mamilii (Turris Mamilia). If the residents of the Via Sacra won, the head would go to the Regia, formerly the residence of the king, as well as the destination of the tail.

The claim of the Mamilii to the head may be based on their family history, which connected them by marriage to the ruling dynasty of the Tarquins. A Mamilius who was the son-in-law of Tarquinius Superbus had given the expelled king refuge after the monarchy was abolished. Despite this questionable beginning, the Mamilii were later known for loyalty and outstanding service to the Republic.

The Subura had equine associations in the Imperial era. Martial mentions mule teams on its steep slope, though normally traffic from draft animals was not permitted within Rome during daylight hours. An inscription found there indicates that the muleteers sought the divine protection of Hercules, Silvanus, and Epona. Silvanus had an association with Mars dating back to the archaic agricultural prayer preserved by Cato's farming treatise, in which the two are invoked either as one or jointly to protect the health of livestock. Epona was the Celtic horse goddess, the sole deity with a Gaulish name whose cult can be documented in Rome.

Exactly where the ceremonial struggle took place, or how, is unclear, but it implies a final procession to either site.

== Modern interpretations ==
=== Corn spirit ===
During the era of Wilhelm Mannhardt, J.G. Frazer and the Cambridge Ritualists, the October Horse was regarded as the embodiment of the "corn spirit", "conceived in human or animal form" in Frazer's view, so that "the last standing corn is part of its body—its neck, its head, or its tail." ("Corn" here means "grain" in general, not "maize".) In The Golden Bough (1890), Frazer regarded the horse's tail and blood as "the chief parts of the corn-spirit's representative," the transporting of which to the Regia brought the corn-spirit's blessing "to the king's house and hearth" and the community. He conjectured that horses were also sacrificed at the grove of Diana Nemorensis at Aricia, as a mythic retaliation because the resurrected Virbius, the first divine "King of the Wood" (the priest called rex nemorensis), had been killed by horses—an explanation also of why horses were banned from the grove. As early as 1908, William Warde Fowler expressed his doubts that the corn-spirit concept sufficiently accounted for all the ritual aspects of the Equus October.

=== Indo-European horse sacrifice ===
Dumézil argued that the October Horse preserved vestiges of a common Indo-European rite of kingship, evidenced also by the Vedic ashvamedha and the Irish inaugural sacrifice described by Giraldus Cambrensis as taking place in Ulster in the early medieval period. Perhaps the most striking similarity between the Vedic ritual and the Roman is that the sacrificial victim was the right-hand horse of a chariot team, though not the winner of a race in the Vedic rite. The head in the ashvamedha, signifying spiritual energy, was reserved as a talisman for the king afterwards; the middle of the horse embodied physical force; and the tail was grasped by the officiant and represented the fertility of livestock.

A trace of horse sacrifice might be detectable among the continental Celts in the personal name Epomeduos, meaning "Horse Sacrificer" in one interpretation of the name, found on silver coins of the Arverni in Gaul. But no race was involved in the medieval Celtic ritual; the horse, a mare who seems to have been the sexual surrogate of the goddess of sovereignty, was consumed communally by king and people from a cauldron in which he was immersed and inaugurated. (In the ashvamedha, the gender of horse and human is reversed.) Both the chariot race and an implied cauldron of initiation (to the extent that the latter might be relevant to the October Horse through the comparanda of the Troy Game and Mars' assimilation to the child-god Maris) are generally regarded as the elements of the Roman festival most likely to be Etruscan, and thus of uncertain value as to an Indo-European origin, though the regenerative cauldron occurs in the Welsh Branwen as well as the Irish kingship ritual.

Some fundamental differences between the Roman rite and the Vedic and Celtic forms pose obstacles to situating the Equus October within the trifunctional schema. The equus is sacrificed to the Roman god of war, not kingship. Dumézil's follower Jaan Puhvel deals with the Roman rite only glancingly in his essay "Aspects of Equine Functionality," exploring mainly the Vedic and Celtic evidence for an "Indo-European equine myth" that "involves the mating of a kingship-class representative with the hippomorphous transfunctional goddess, and the creation of twin offspring belonging to the level of the third estate."

Puhvel finds few linkages between the October Horse and the ásvamedha, primarily because the method of killing the horse differs so dramatically, and the crucial element of ritual mating is absent. He observes, however, that "the absence of the sexual element in Roman horse sacrifice is no surprise, for early Roman ritual is exceedingly nonerotic"—an avoidance he attributes to the Romans' desire to differentiate their sexual probity from the supposed license of the Etruscans.

=== Homo Necans ===
In Homo Necans, Walter Burkert saw the October Horse as a "sacrifice of dissolution" (hence his willingness to entertain the ancient tradition that associated it with the Fall of Troy), and the struggle for the head as an agon, a competitive contest that vents violence and rage, as do funeral games.

=== Julius Caesar and human sacrifice ===
In 46 BCE, discontent arose among the troops supporting Julius Caesar in the civil wars. His lavish public expenditures, they complained, came at their expense: Instead of raising the army's pay, Caesar was using his newly confiscated wealth for such displays as a silk canopy to shelter spectators at the games he staged. The disgruntled soldiers rioted. Caesar came upon them, and shocked them back into discipline by killing one on sight. According to Cassius Dio, the sole source for the episode:

Two others were slain as a sort of ritual observance (hierourgia, ἱερουργία). The true cause I am unable to state, inasmuch as the Sibyl made no utterance and there was no other similar oracle, but at any rate they were sacrificed in the Campus Martius by the pontifices and the priest of Mars, and their heads were set up near the Regia.

Both Wissowa and Dumézil read Dio's sardonic take on these events to mean that an actual sacrifice occurred with human victims replacing the October Horse. The two killings have no common elements other than the site and the display of the heads at the Regia, but the passage has been used as evidence that the flamen of Mars presided over the October Horse as well, even though the officiant is never mentioned in sources that deal explicitly with the Equus. Human sacrifice had always been rare at Rome, and had been formally abolished as a part of public religion about fifty years earlier. Some executions took on a sacral aura, but Dio seems to regard the soldiers' deaths as a grotesque parody of a sacrifice, whatever Caesar's intent may have been. Jörg Rüpke thought that Dio's account, while "muddled", might indicate that Caesar as pontifex maximus took up the Trojan interpretation of the October Horse, in light of the Julian family's claim to have descended directly from Iulus, the son of the Trojan refugee Aeneas. In Colleen McCullough's novel The October Horse, it is Caesar himself who becomes the sacrificial victim, on the Ides of March rather than the Ides of October when the Equus was sacrificed.

== Bibliography ==
- Dumézil, Georges (1975). Fêtes romaines d'été et d'automne, suivi de Dix questions romaines. Paris: Gallimard.
- Rousseau, Michel (1976). "Le cheval d'octobre (October equus) éclairé par M. Georges Dumézil". Bulletin de l'Académie Vétérinaire de France. 129 (1): 125–127. doi:10.4267/2042/65922.
