= Trigarium =

Equestrian training ground in Rome

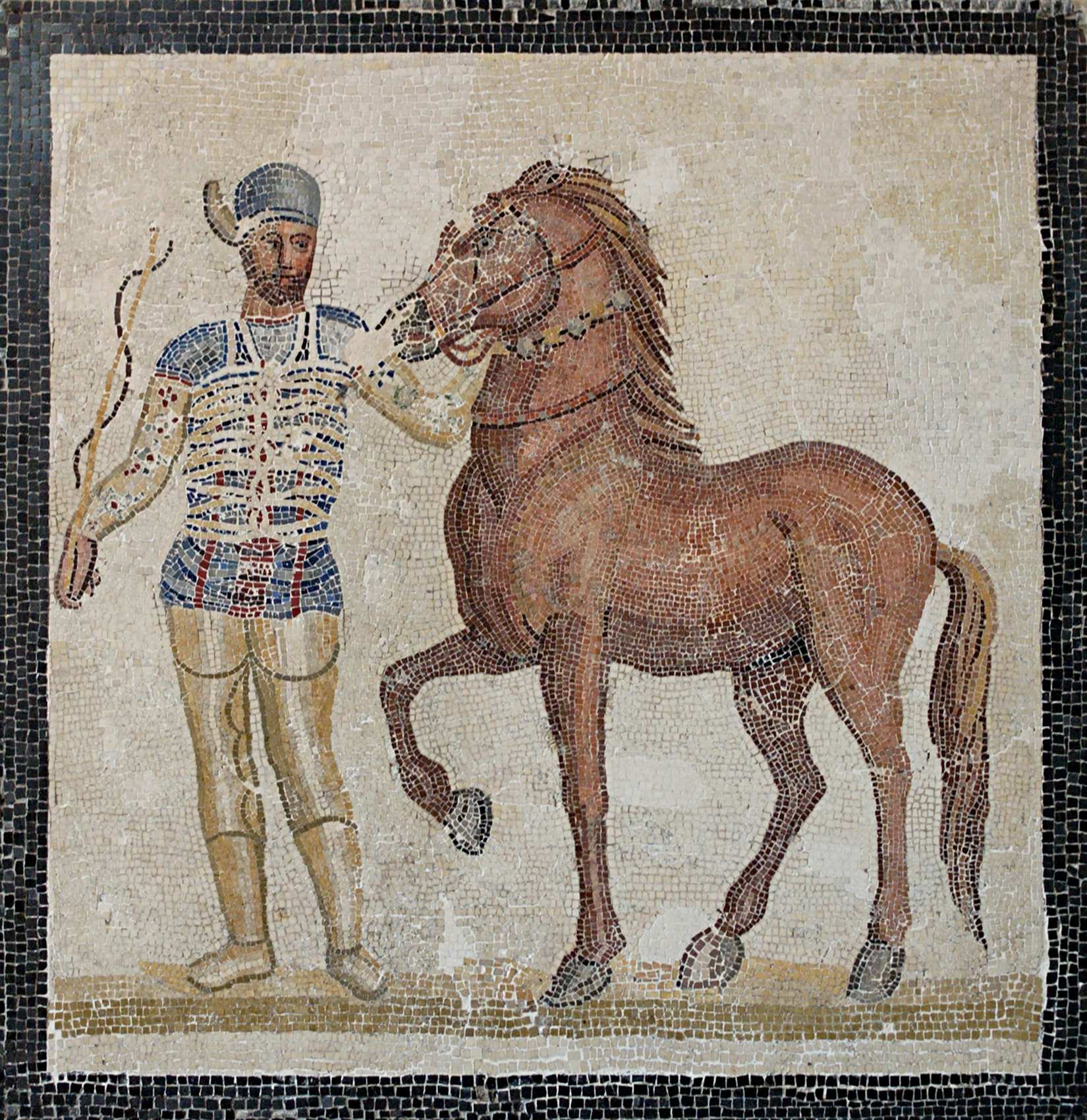
Charioteer of the Blue Team with horse (3rd-century mosaic)

The trigarium was an equestrian training ground in the northwest corner of the Campus Martius ("Field of Mars") in ancient Rome. Its name was taken from the triga, a three-horse chariot.

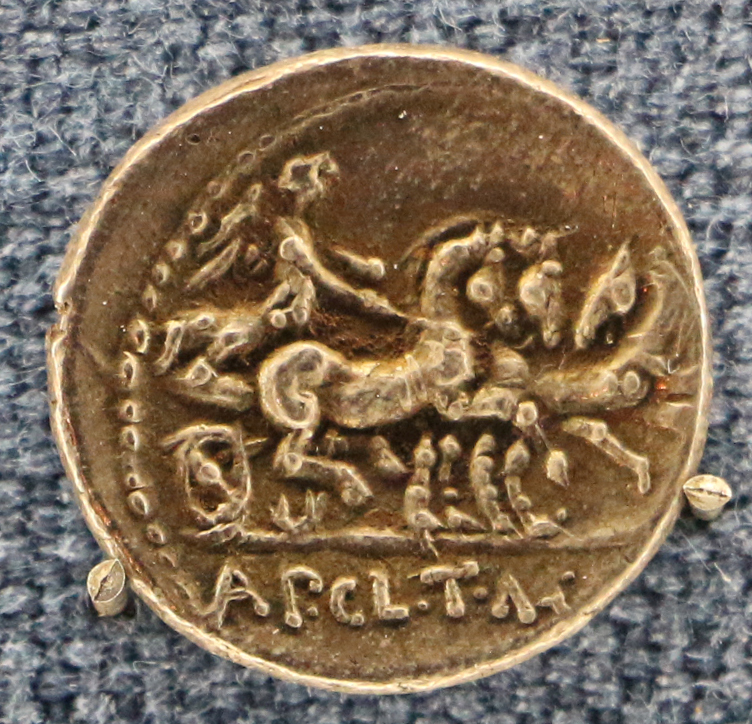
Victory in a triga on a Republican denarius (111/110 BC)

The trigarium was an open space located south of the bend of the Tiber River, near the present-day Via Giulia. It may be part of a larger field set aside as a public space for horse pasturage and military drill for youths, which was the original purpose of the Campus Martius. The earliest reference to the trigarium dates to the time of Claudius, and the latest to the second half of the 4th century.

To preserve its flexibility of purpose, the trigarium had no permanent structures; it was used for chariot training and all forms of equestrian exercise. The faction headquarters of the professional charioteers were established nearby, with the trigarium just northwest of the stables and clubhouse of the Green and Blue teams. An adjacent area where people played ball and hoop games and wrestled was the site of temporary wooden stadia built by Julius Caesar and Augustus and finally the permanent Stadium of Domitian.

Trigarium became a generic word for an equestrian training ground, as evidenced by inscriptions. For instance, a charioteer in Roman Africa who died during a race was buried in the nearby trigarium. Pliny uses the word to mean equestrian exercise generally: he describes a fortified water or sports drink, prepared with powdered goat dung and vinegar, that was drunk by Nero "when he wanted to strengthen himself for the trigarium". Pliny asserts that Italian horses were superior for the exercises of the trigarium.

== Triga ==
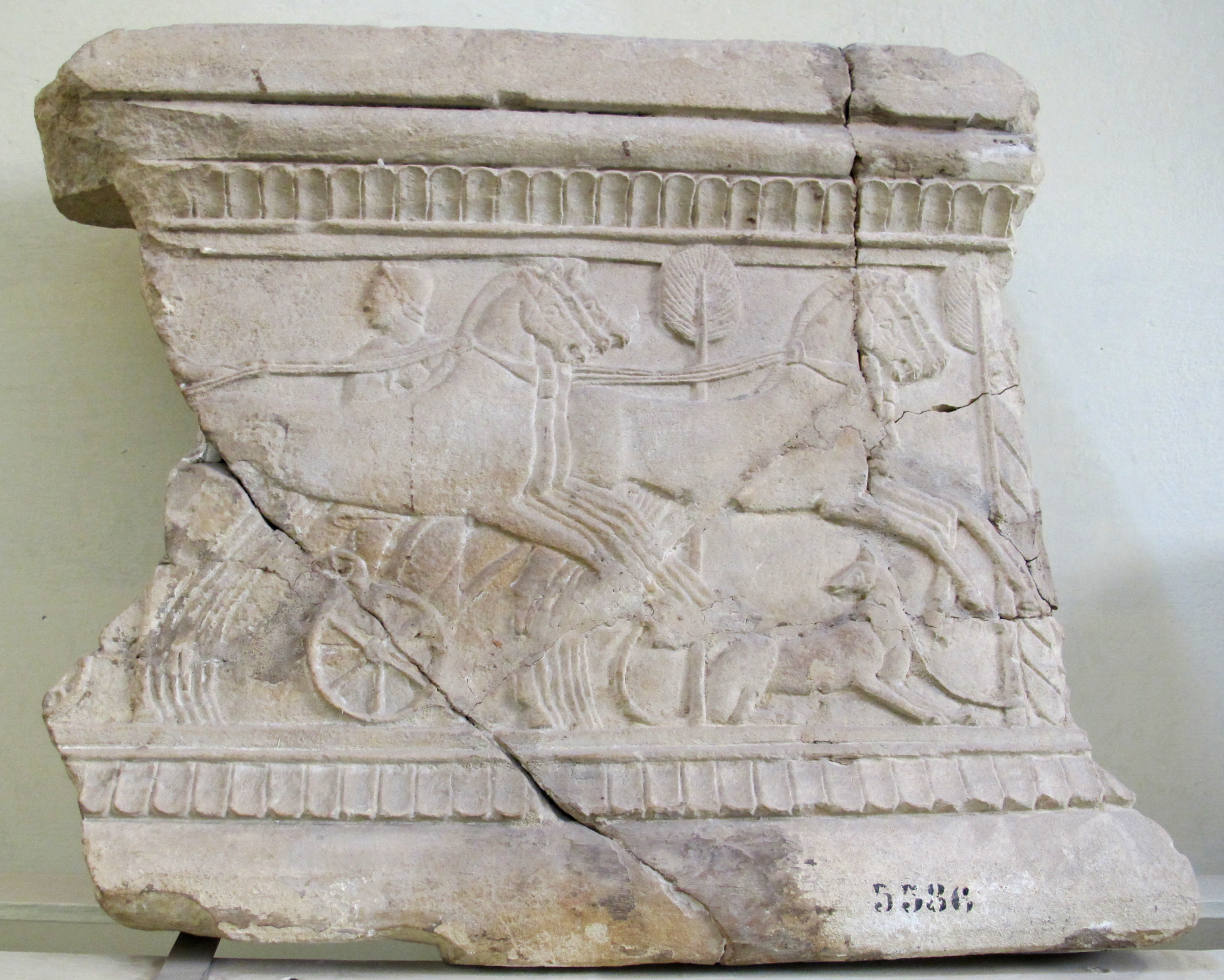
Two trigae teams on an Etruscan cinerary urn

The name trigarium derives from triga, a three-horse chariot; compare the more common quadriga and biga, the four- and two-horse chariot. In ancient Greece, three-horse chariots might be used for war, but are not known to have been raced. The chariot of Achilles in the Iliad (16.152) was drawn by two immortal horses and a third who was mortal. In Etruscan racing, the third horse served as a trace horse on the inside of the turn, and was not yoked. The Romans only rarely raced with a team of three. Dionysius mentioned trigae races under Augustus, and they are also recorded in inscriptions for later periods.

The driver of a triga was called a trigarius. Since the three-horse yoking was uncommon, trigarius may also mean a participant in the equestrian exercises of the trigarium in general.

Isidore of Seville comments on the sacral origin of chariot races as part of the public games (ludi), which were held in conjunction with certain religious festivals. The four-horse quadriga, Isidore says, represents the Sun, and the two-horse biga the moon; the triga is for the infernal gods (di inferi), with the three horses representing the three ages of human beings: childhood, youth, and old age.

== Religious use ==
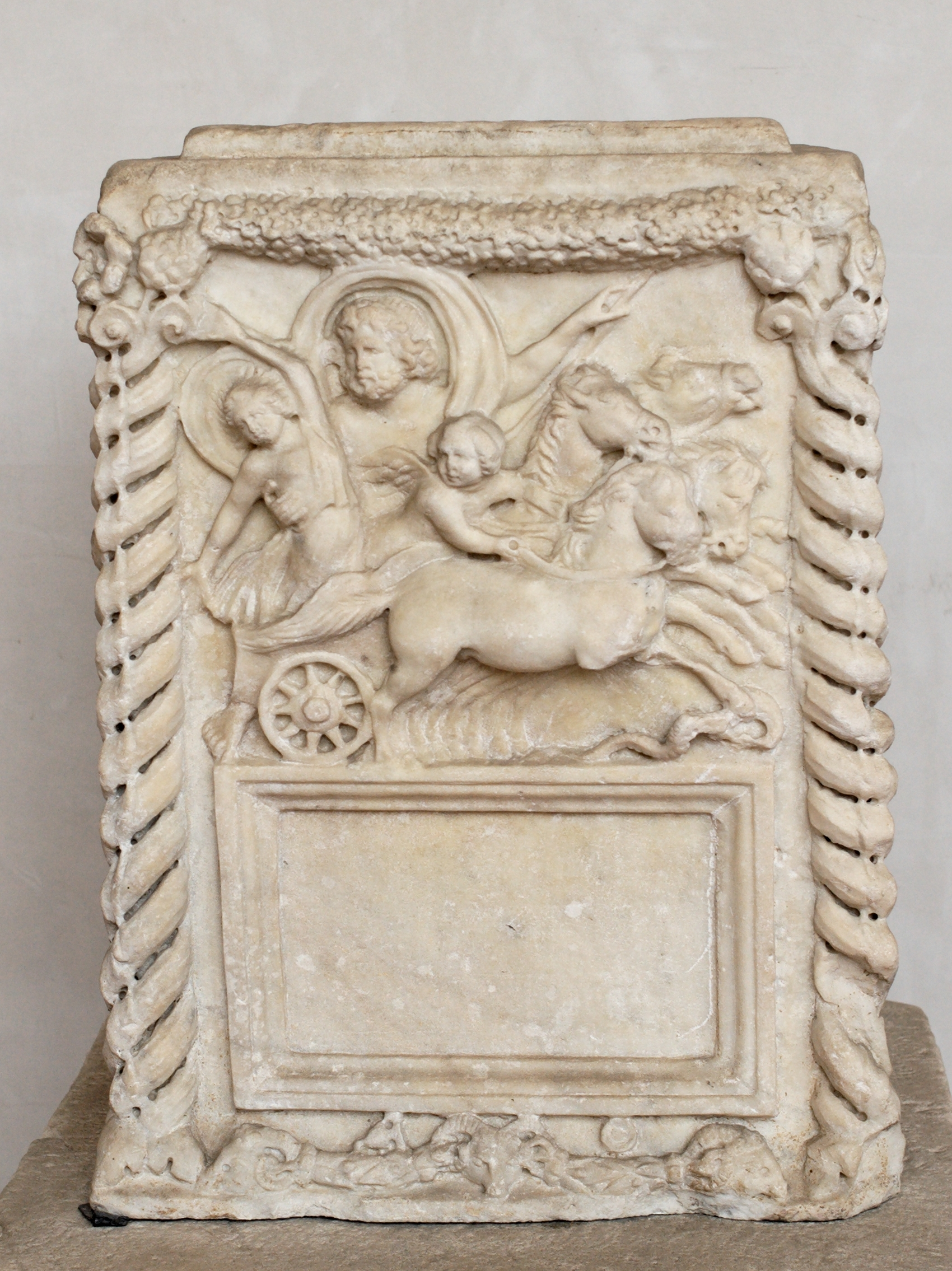
Cinerary altar depicting the four-horse chariot in which Proserpina was abducted by the ruler of the underworld (2nd century)

Although its primary use was as a training ground, the trigarium is sometimes thought to have been the venue for the two-horse chariot races that preceded the October Horse ritual, performed in the Campus Martius in honor of Mars on October 15. The lead horse of the winning team was sacrificed ad Nixas, a landmark just east of the trigarium that was either an altar to the birth deities (di nixi) or perhaps something called the Ciconiae Nixae. At the October Horse ceremonies, two neighborhoods fought a mock battle for possession of the horse's head as a trophy for the coming year, and a runner carried the horse's tail to the Regia to drip its blood on the sacred hearth of Rome. The races of the Equirria on February 27 and March 14, also celebrated for Mars, may have been held at the trigarium as well, and possibly events for the ludi tarentini, which became the Saecular Games. The area may, however, have been only a practice field for these events.

An underground altar to the divine couple Dis Pater and Proserpina was located in the Tarentum, near or adjacent to the trigarium. Dis was the Roman equivalent of the Greek god Plouton (Latinized as Pluto), who abducted Proserpina (Greek Persephone or Kore "the Maiden") in his chariot to the underworld to become his bride and queen. In the mystery religions, the couple are sometimes represented as the Sun and Moon. Pluto's chariot is drawn by the four horses characteristic of rulers and Sun gods. Horse racing along with the propitiation of underworld gods was characteristic of "old and obscure" Roman festivals such as the Consualia, the October Horse, the Taurian Games, and sites in the Campus Martius such as the Tarentum (where the ludi tarentini originated) and the trigarium.
