= Lusus Troiae =

Equestrian event in ancient Rome

Drawing of an Etruscan oinochoë with a legend reading Truia, sometimes thought to depict the Troy Game

Cretan labyrinth

The Lusus Troiae, also as Ludus Troiae and ludicrum Troiae ("Troy Game" or "Game of Troy") was an equestrian event held in ancient Rome. It was among the ludi ("games"), celebrated at imperial funerals, temple foundings, or in honor of a military victory. The lusus was occasionally presented at the Saecular Games, but was not attached regularly to a particular religious festival.

Participation was a privilege for boys of the nobility (nobiles). It was a display of communal skill, not a contest.

== Description ==
The fullest description of the exercise is given by Vergil, Aeneid 5.545–603, as the final event in the games held to commemorate the anniversary of the death of Aeneas's father, Anchises. The drill features three troops (turmae) — each made up of twelve riders, a leader, and two armor-bearers — who perform intricate drills on horseback:

… The column split apart
As files in the three squadrons all in line
Turned away, cantering left and right; recalled
They wheeled and dipped their lances for a charge.
They entered then on parades and counter-parades,
The two detachments, matched in the arena,
Winding in and out of one another,
And whipped into sham cavalry skirmishes
By baring backs in flight, then whirling round
With leveled points, then patching up a truce
And riding side by side. So intricate
In ancient times on mountainous Crete they say
The Labyrinth, between walls in the dark,
Ran criss-cross a bewildering thousand ways
Devised by guile, a maze insoluble,
Breaking down every clue to the way out.
So intricate the drill of Trojan boys
Who wove the patterns of their prancing horses,
Figured, in sport, retreats and skirmishes …

Complex intertwining manoeuvres as a display of horsemanship were characteristic of Roman cavalry reviews on the parade ground. The Greek military writer Arrian describes these in his book The Art of Military Tactics (Technē Taktikē), and says they originated among the non-Roman cavalry units provided by the allies (auxilia), particularly the Gauls (that is, the continental Celts) and Iberians. The Troy Game, however, was purely ceremonial and involved youths too young for military service.

== History and origin ==
The lusus Troiae was "revived" by Julius Caesar in 45 or 46 BC, perhaps in connection with his family claim to have descended from Iulus, the son of Aeneas who in the game of the Aeneid rides a horse that was a gift from the Carthaginian queen Dido. Given the mythological setting, the description of the lusus Troiae in the Aeneid is likely to have been the Augustan poet's fictional aetiology. Historically, the event cannot be shown to have been held before the time of Sulla, and it has been doubted that the lusus presented under Sulla was the Troy Game. A similar-sounding event during the ludi Romani at the time of the Second Punic War is also uncertain as evidence for an earlier staging.

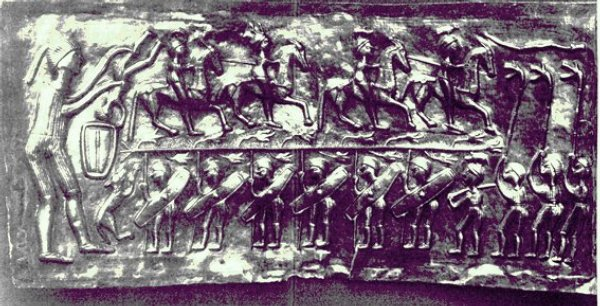
Panel from the Gundestrup Cauldron sometimes interpreted as depicting an equestrian ritual of initiation

Detail of foot soldiers from the opposite side of the Truia wine-server

The claim that the event "extends back at least to the sixth century B.C." is based in part on a late 7th-century Etruscan wine-server (oinochoë) from Tragliatella (near Caere) which depicts mounted youths emerging from a labyrinth with the legend TRUIA, one possible meaning of which is Troy. Vergil explicitly compares the patterns of the drill to the Cretan Labyrinth, which was associated with the geranos ("crane dance") taught by Theseus to the Athenian youth he rescued from the Minotaur there. In myth and ritual, the labyrinth, and hence the lusus, has been interpreted as "a return from danger, a triumph of life over death", or more specifically as an initiation ritual. The geranos of Theseus serves as a "mythic prototype for the escape of initiates from the rigors of initiation"; the feet of the shield-bearers on the Truia wine-server may suggest dance steps. Initiation iconography similar to that of the Etruscan oinochoë is found on a panel of the Gundestrup Cauldron, generally regarded as presenting Celtic subject matter with a Thracian influence in workmanship. At least one of the Celtic polities of central Gaul, the Aedui, claimed like the Romans to be of Trojan descent and were formally recognized by the Roman Senate as the "brothers" as well as the allies of Rome long before they were incorporated into the empire.

The Etruscan designation of the game as "Truia", if that is what the vase depicts, may be a play on words, as truare means "to move", with a specialized sense in the vocabulary of weaving: it has been argued that the lusus Troiae is the "running thread game", intended to repair the "social fabric" of Rome after the recent civil wars. The Troy Game was performed on a purification day (dies lustri). Vergil uses two forms of the verb "to weave" to describe the equestrian movements, and in some versions of the Theseus myth, the hero's return from the labyrinth is made possible by following a daedalean thread provided by Ariadne. The game may have connections to Mars, who was associated with horses through his Equirria festivals and the ritual of the October Horse, as a patron of warrior youth. Mars' youthful armed priests the Salii performed dance steps expressed by forms of the verb truare, here perhaps meaning "to perform a truia dance". The Troy Game was supervised by the Tribunes of the Celeres, who are connected to the Salii in the Fasti Praenestini.

Augustus established the lusus Troiae as a regular event. Its performance was part of a general interest in Trojan origins reflected also in the creation of the Tabulae Iliacae or "Trojan Tablets", low reliefs that illustrate scenes from the Iliad and often present text in the form of acrostics or palindromes, suggesting patterned movement or literary mazes.

The young Tiberius led a turma at the games celebrating the dedication of the Temple of the Divine Julius, 18 August 29 BC. The lusus was also performed at the dedication of the Theater of Marcellus in 13 BC, and of the Temple of Mars Ultor, 1 August 2 BC. The children in eastern dress on the Ara Pacis have sometimes been interpreted as Gaius and Lucius Caesar in "Trojan" garb for the game in 13 BC. The Troy Game continued to be staged under other emperors of the Julio-Claudian dynasty. Seneca mentions the event in his Troades (line 778). Nero participated in 47 AD, at the age of nine, along with Britannicus.

== See also ==
- Hippika gymnasia
- Taurian Games
- Troy Town
