= Equirria =

Ancient Roman festival of chariot racing

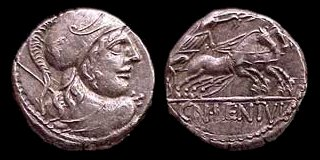
Denarius depicting the helmeted head of Mars, with Victory driving a biga on the reverse (issued 88 BC by Gnaeus Cornelius Lentulus Clodianus)

The Equirria (also as Ecurria, from equicurria, "horse races") were two ancient Roman festivals of chariot racing, or perhaps horseback racing, held in honor of the god Mars, one 27 February and the other 14 March.

== Site ==
The Equirria took place in the Campus Martius outside the sacred boundary of Rome (pomerium). The exact course is debated: perhaps near the Altar of Mars in the campus; or on the Tarentum, the site of the ludi tarentini, which became the Saecular Games; or the Trigarium. When the Tiber flooded, the Equirria were transferred to the Campus Martialis on the Caelian Hill, a field without permanent structures.

== On the calendar ==
The Equirria were said to have been founded by Romulus, the son of Mars. Both appear on the oldest Roman calendars inscribed on stone. The Equirria are part of what Michael Lipka calls "temporal focalization" in the Roman conception of deity. The festivals of Mars—the 27 February Equirria, a feria on the Kalends of March (a day sacred also to his mother Juno), Agonalia 17 March, Tubilustrium 23 March, the ritual of the October Horse 15 October, and Armilustrium 19 October—cluster at his namesake month (Latin Martius), except for festivals of Mars in October to close the military campaigning season.

In the earliest form of the calendar, the year began with March, and thus the 27 February Equirria originally preceded New Year's Day, and was the last festival for Mars of the year. The 14 March Equirria occurs the day before the Ides, when the Roman people celebrated the feast of Anna Perenna, whose name expresses her role as a goddess of the year (Latin annus; cf. English "perennial"). The March Equirria and the Regifugium ("King's Flight") are the only such festivals to fall on an even-numbered date. Despite scholarly efforts, no explanation for this displacement has found wide acceptance. Georg Wissowa thought the March Equirria had originally occurred on the Ides, and was moved up a day because of conflicts among religious events concentrated around this ritually fraught time; an alternate view is that it was placed "at some convenient day" between the Nones and the Ides. At any rate, the horse races framed the ritual turn of the year, and the difficulties of the placement of the two Equirria arise from changes made to the calendar, when January became the first month.

== Significance ==
"The Equirria occurred between King's Flight and New Year, bridging the period of 'disorder': held immediately before the new moon, they prepared the way for the reestablishment of order with the new month and year."

Originally, the Equirria may have featured races on horseback, like the archaic festivals of the Consualia and Taurian Games, rather than chariot races. The gods of the underworld (di inferi) were characteristically propitiated by horse racing in the Campus Martius with "old and obscure" festivals such as the Consualia, at sites including the Tarentum and the Trigarium. Hendrik Wagenvoort speculated that the archaic Mars "had been imagined as the god of death and the underworld in the shape of a horse."

William Warde Fowler understood the Equirria as "lustrations of the horse" for the army. They occur during what most scholars see as a general "war festival" for Mars. The end of the campaigning season was marked in October, with the ritual of the October Horse, which also involved chariot races, on the Ides, and the Armilustrium on 19 October. The paucity of evidence on the Equirria, as with other archaic festivals, may indicate that they were preserved for the sake of religious tradition, but not attended by masses of people.
