= Mamilia gens =

Ancient Roman family

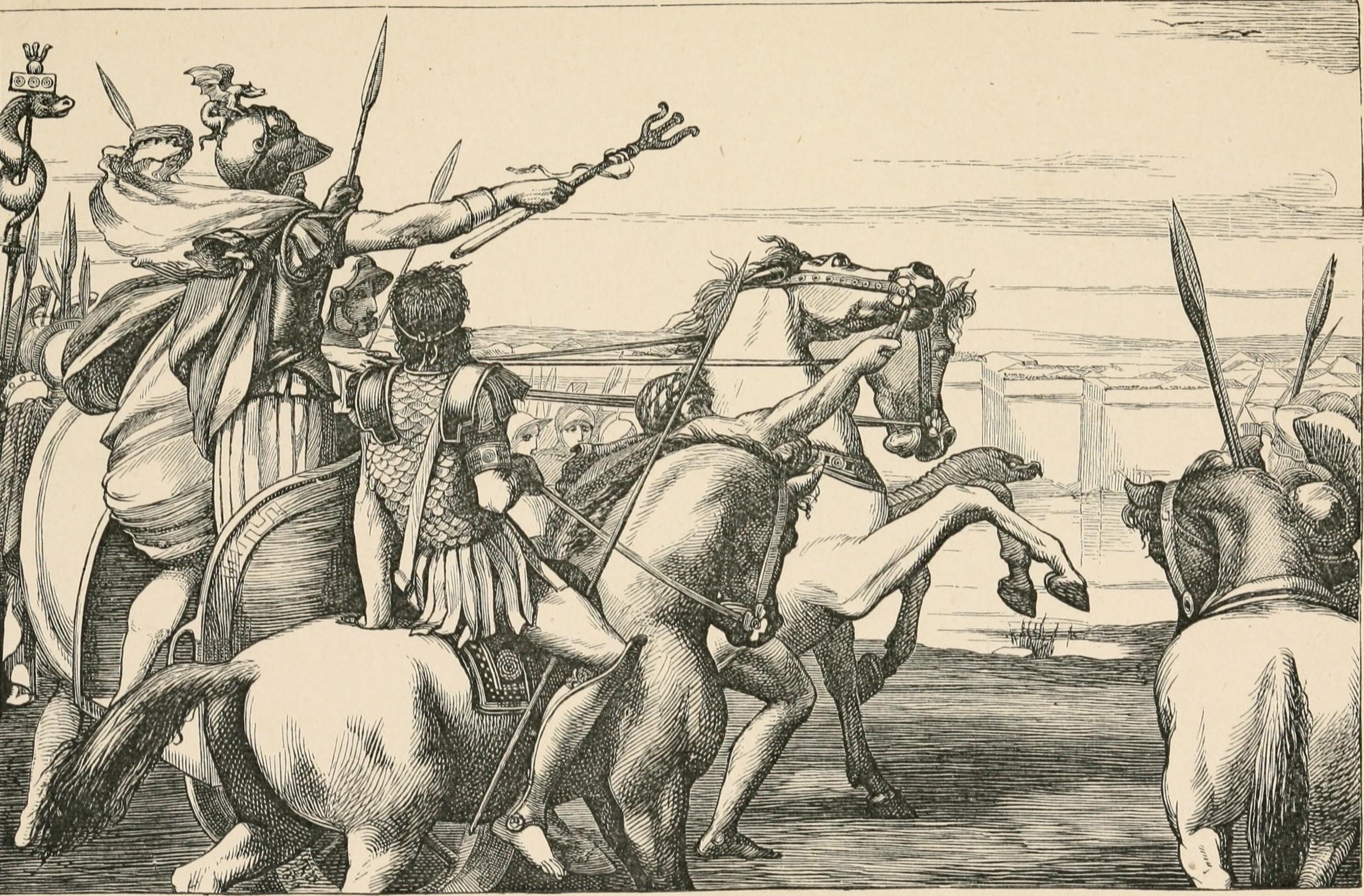
Octavius Mamilius, prince of Tusculum, on horseback before the Walls of Rome. On his left, in a chariot, is Lars Porsena, the King of Clusium. (Note: The scene here depicted is not described by Livy or the other ancient historians; Mamilius is known for leading the Latin forces at the Battle of Lake Regillus, alongside his father-in-law, Lucius Tarquinius Superbus. Lars Porsena's invasion occurred about ten years earlier. However, since Porsena was supposed to have been acting on behalf of Tarquin, there is nothing unlikely about Mamilius participating in that earlier war. According to Macaulay, the figure whose head is visible between Mamilius' head and Porsena's arm could be Sextus Tarquinius, although he could also be the owner of the leg in the lower left corner.) John Reinhard Weguelin, illustration from Lays of Ancient Rome (1881 edition).

The gens Mamilia was a plebeian family at ancient Rome during the period of the Republic. The gens was originally one of the most distinguished families of Tusculum, and indeed in the whole of Latium. It is first mentioned in the time of the Tarquins; and it was to a member of this family, Octavius Mamilius, that Lucius Tarquinius Superbus, the seventh and last king of Rome, betrothed his daughter. The gens obtained Roman citizenship in the 5th century BC, and some of its members must subsequently have settled at Rome, where Lucius Mamilius Vitulus became the first of the family to hold the consulship in 265 BC, the year before the First Punic War.

== Origin ==
The Mamilii traced their nomen and origin to the mythical Mamilia, the daughter of Telegonus, who was regarded as the legendary founder of Tusculum and the son of Ulysses and the goddess Circe. This origin was referred to on a coin of the gens, the obverse of which depicts the head of Mercury or Hermes, the ancestor of Ulysses, and the reverse Ulysses himself, clad in the humble disguise he assumed to avoid being recognized by the suitors of Penelope.

== Praenomina ==
The earliest of the Mamilii to occur in history bore the praenomen Octavius, which was rare at Rome. His descendants used the praenomina Lucius, Quintus, Gaius, and Marcus, all of which were very common names throughout Roman history.

== Branches and cognomina ==
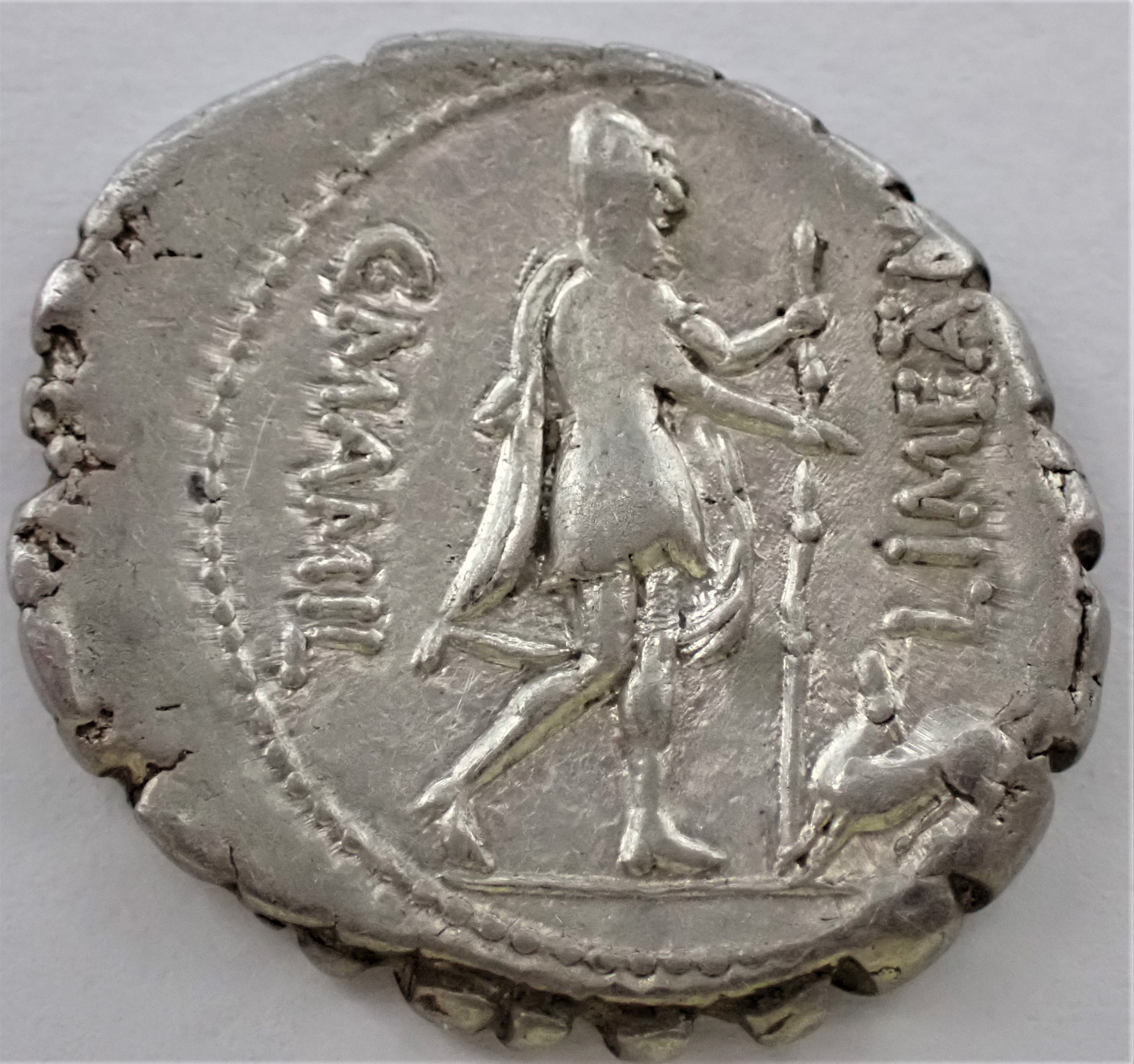
Denarius of Gaius Mamilius Limetanus. The obverse (not pictured) features a head of Mercury; on the reverse, Odysseus is welcomed by his hound.

The Mamilii were divided into three families, with the cognomina Limetanus, Turrinus, and Vitulus, of which the two latter were the most ancient and important. Limetanus is the only surname which occurs on coins.

Vitulus was a surname in both the Mamilia and Voconia gentes. Niebuhr supposes that Vitulus is merely another form of Italus, and remarks that we find in the same manner in the Mamilia gens the surname Turrinus; that is, Tyrrhenus, an Etruscan. "It was customary, as is proved by the oldest Roman Fasti, for the great houses to take distinguishing surnames from a people with whom they were connected by blood, or by the ties of public hospitality."

The ancients, however, connected the surname Vitulus with the Latin word signifying a "calf", which was depicted on a coin of one of the Voconii Vituli. Although the connection of Turrinus and Tyrrhenus is by no means impossible, or even unlikely, it could also have been derived from turris, "a tower". An ancient tower known as the Turris Mamilia stood in the Subura, and figured in a ritual battle between the residents of two neighborhoods at Rome for the head of the October Horse.

== Members ==
This list includes abbreviated praenomina. For an explanation of this practice, see filiation.

- Octavius Mamilius, a prince of Tusculum, and son-in-law of Lucius Tarquinius Superbus. He was dictator of the Latin army at the Battle of Lake Regillus, in 498 BC, and was slain by Titus Herminius Aquilinus.
- Lucius Mamilius, perhaps the grandson of Octavius, was dictator of Tusculum in 460 BC, and sent an army to help recover the Capitol during the revolt of Appius Herdonius. The following year the Romans helped him recover the citadel of Tusculum from the Aequi. In recognition of his service, in 458 the senate granted him Roman citizenship.
- Lucius Mamilius, triumvir monetalis, probably between 189 and 180 BC.

=== Mamilii Vituli ===
- Marcus Mamilius Vitulus, grandfather of the consuls of 265 and 262 BC.
- Quintus Mamilius M. f. Vitulus, father of the consul of 265 and 262 BC.
- Lucius Mamilius Q. f. M. n. Vitulus, consul in 265 BC, the year before the beginning of the First Punic War.
- Quintus Mamilius Q. f. M. n. Vitulus, consul in 262 BC, during the First Punic War. With his colleague, Lucius Postumius Megellus, he took the city of Agrigentum.
- Gaius Mamilius Vitulus, father of the praetor of 207 BC.
- Gaius Mamilius C. f. Vitulus, the first plebeian elected curio maximus, in 209 BC, during the Second Punic War; he was praetor in 207, and received Sicily as his province. In 203 he was one of the ambassadors sent to Philip, King of Macedon. He died in the pestilence of 174 BC.

=== Mamilii Turrini ===
- Quintus Mamilius Turrinus, grandfather of the consul of 239 BC.
- Quintus Mamilius Q. f. Turrinus, father of the consul of 239 BC.
- Gaius Mamilius Q. f. Q. n. Turrinus, consul in 239 BC.
- Quintus Mamilius Turrinus, plebeian aedile in 207 and praetor in 206 BC; by lot he obtained the jurisdictio peregrina, but he was sent by the senate into Gaul.

=== Mamilii Limetani ===
- Gaius Mamilius Limetanus, tribune of the plebs in 109 BC, carried a law inquiring into the cases of persons who had assisted Jugurtha in his opposition to the senate, and who had received bribes from him to neglect their duty to the state.
- Gaius Mamilius C. f. Limetanus, triumvir monetalis in 82 BC.

== See also ==
- List of Roman gentes
