= Fordicidia =

Ancient Roman religious festival of fertility

- Observed by: Roman Republic, Roman Empire
- Type: Classical Roman religion
- Observances: Sacrifice of a pregnant cow
- Date: April 15
- Related to: Tellus, Cerialia, Parilia

In ancient Roman religion, the Fordicidia was a festival of fertility, held on the Ides of April (April 15), that pertained to farming and animal husbandry. It involved the sacrifice of a pregnant cow to Tellus, the ancient Roman goddess of the Earth, in proximity to the festival of Ceres (Cerealia) on April 19.

On the Roman religious calendar, the month of April (Aprilis) was in general preoccupied with deities who were female or ambiguous in gender, opening with the Feast of Venus on the Kalends. Several other festivals pertaining to farm life were held in April: the Parilia, a feast of shepherds, on April 21; the Robigalia on April 25, to protect crops from blight; and the Vinalia, one of the two wine festivals on the calendar, at the end of the month. Of these, the Fordicidia and Robigalia are likely to have been of greatest antiquity. William Warde Fowler, whose early 20th-century work on Roman festivals remains a standard reference, asserted that the Fordicidia was "beyond doubt one of the oldest sacrificial rites in Roman religion."

== Sacrifice and ritual ==
The late Republican scholar Varro explains the name of the festival as follows:

The Fordicidia was named from fordae cows; a forda cow is one that is carrying an unborn calf; because on this day several pregnant cows are officially and publicly sacrificed in the curiae, the festival was called the Fordicidia from fordae caedendae, 'the pregnant cows which were to be slaughtered.'

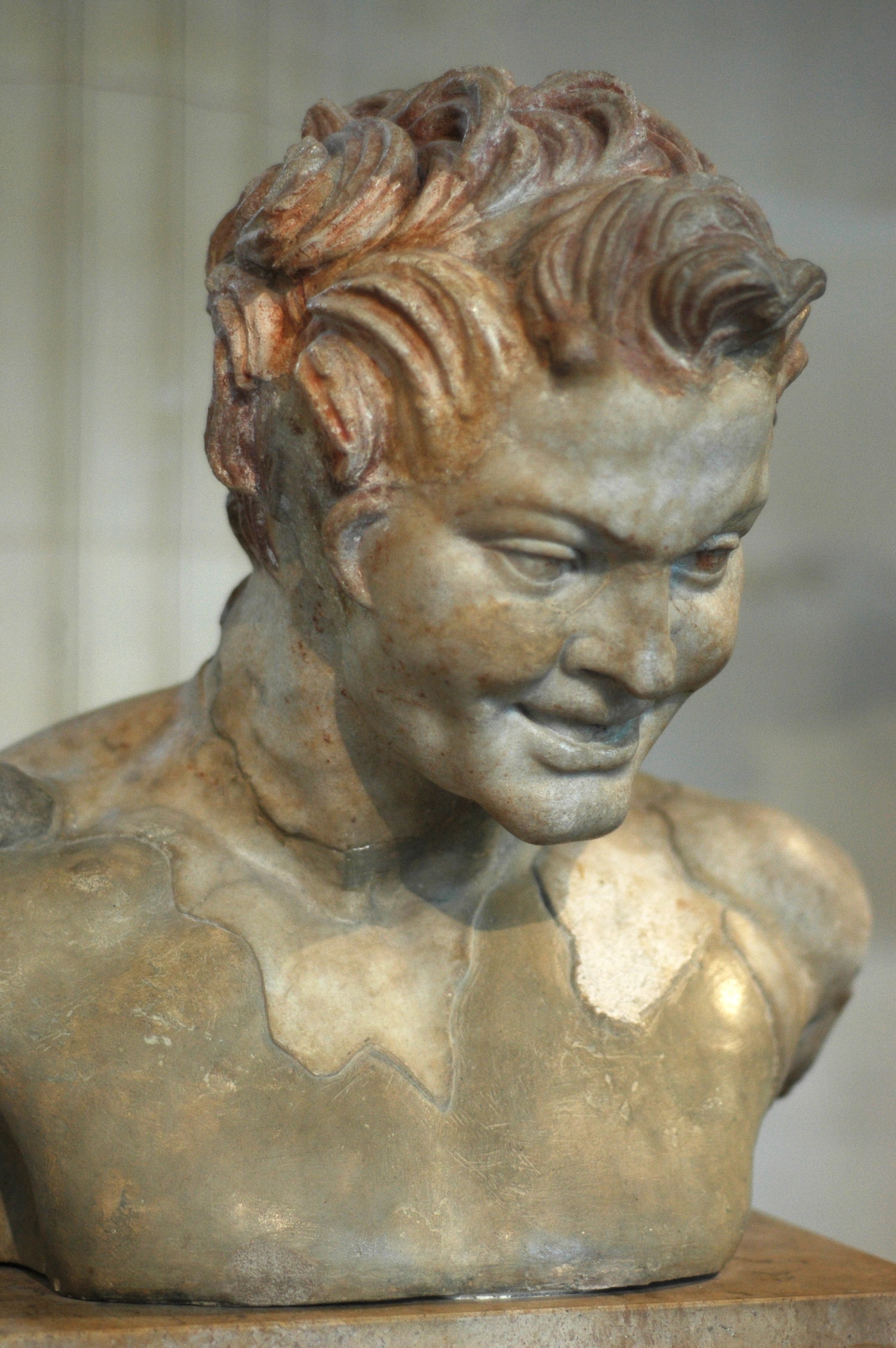
Faunus

The forms horda and Hordicalia are also found. Like many other aspects of Roman law and religion, the institution of the Fordicidia was attributed to Numa Pompilius, the Sabine second king of Rome. The rustic god Faunus instructed Numa in a dream that a sacrifice to Tellus would mitigate the harsh agricultural conditions Rome was grappling with, but the oracular message required interpretation: "By the death of cattle, King, Tellus must be placated: two cows, that is. Let a single heifer yield two lives (animae) for the rites." Numa solved the riddle by instituting the sacrifice of a pregnant cow.

As with other rituals in which public cult was mirrored by private, or vice versa, one sacrifice was conducted on behalf of the state, in this case at the Capitol, and one in each of the thirty curiae, the most ancient divisions of the city made by Romulus from the original three tribes. This was the first of two festivals involving the curiae, the other being the Fornacalia on February 17, which differed in that there was no ritual of state corresponding to the local ceremonies and its moveable date was fixed annually by the curio maximus.

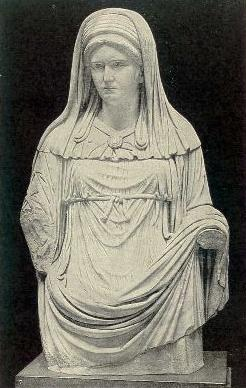
Virgo Vestalis Maxima, the high priestess of Vesta

In the state sacrifice for the Fordicidia, the unborn calf was wrenched from its mother's womb by the attendants of the Virgo Vestalis Maxima, or Vestal Maxima, and burnt. Its ashes were preserved by the Vestals and used as one of the ingredients in the ritual substance suffimen, along with the dried blood of the October Horse from the previous year, and the stalks from which beans had been harvested. The suffimen was sprinkled on the bonfires of the Parilia, the festival devoted to purifying shepherds and their sheep, and later celebrated also as the "birthday" of the city. The sacrifice at the Fordicidia and preparation of the suffimen constituted the first public ceremony of the year in which the Vestals played an active role.

== Meaning ==
The purpose of the sacrifice, as suggested by the Augustan poet Ovid in his elegiac calendar and by the 6th-century antiquarian John Lydus in his book On the Months, was to assure the fertility of the planted grain already growing in the womb of Mother Earth in the guise of Tellus, to whom the sacrifice was offered. As with certain other rituals over which the Vestals presided, the unborn calf is a liminal or mediating being: not yet born, but living; not a full-fledged victim, but sacrificed. The role of the Vestals emphasizes their importance in linking through the ritual reuse of elements the Earth's fertility, the health and safety of the flocks, and the security of the city, including and especially its military security against invasion.

The Fordicidia, along with about half the festivals of Republican Rome, does not appear on the calendar of 354, when the empire was becoming Christianized.

== Comparison ==
In the spirit of the Cambridge Ritualists and comparative mythologists, Fowler pointed to a Chinese spring festival witnessed in 1804 by the British ambassador to China, John Barrow. At the temple of Earth, a large porcelain cow was carried in procession then shattered to reveal several small cow-images inside. These were distributed among the people as tokens of a good growing season. Fowler speculated that the Chinese rite was in origin an animal sacrifice similar to that of the Fordicidia.
