= Ciconiae Nixae =

Landmark in ancient Rome

The Ciconiae Nixae was a landmark, or more likely two separate landmarks, in the Campus Martius of ancient Rome. In A New Topographical Dictionary of Ancient Rome, Lawrence Richardson regards a single site called Ciconiae Nixae as "hypothetical", noting that the subject "has long exercised topographers." The two words are juxtaposed in the regionary lists and located in Region IX near the Tiber River. The 4th-century calendar of Filocalus notes vaguely that the October Horse happened ad nixas, "at the Nixae", suggesting that the regionaries' Ciconiae ("Storks") ought to be taken as a separate entry. Inscriptional evidence also indicates that the Ciconiae was a separate landmark, and that it had to do with wine shipments brought in on the Tiber.

== The Storks ==
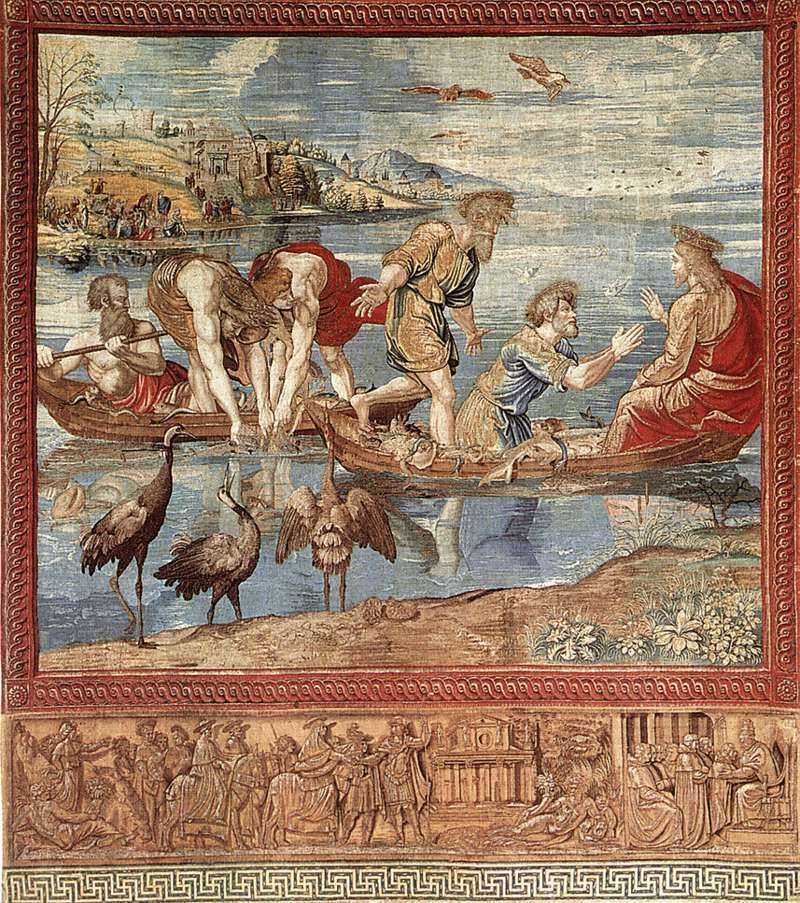
Three cranes or storks in the foreground of a Biblical scene set along the Tiber, with Vatican Hill in the top left corner (The Miraculous Draught of Fishes, 1519, tapestry series by the Flemish workshop of Pieter van Aelst the Elder, based on Raphael)

While Ciconiae means "storks", its supposed connection here to nixae, the past participle of nitor, "support" or "strive", is less clear. Richardson's predecessor Samuel Ball Platner maintained the integrity of the phrase and conjectured that the Ciconiae Nixae was "a certain district of the city, probably an open square, in which there was a statue, or perhaps a relief on one of the surrounding buildings, of two or more storks with crossed bills." William Warde Fowler gathered that the Ciconiae were "three storks carved in stone with bills crossing each other," and that the landmark had not existed during the Republican era.

Earlier scholars hypothesized about the form of the Ciconiae based on comparative imagery. The iconography of three storks is also known from Greece and Gaul, though the birds in the latter case are three cranes (trigaranos; see also geranos, the "crane dance" of Theseus). It can be difficult to distinguish between storks and cranes in depictions, and ancient literature frequently confuses or conflates the two birds. At Byzantium, three stone storks, positioned to face or intersect with each other, formed one of the protective talismans of the city. Hesychius says that Apollonius of Tyana installed them to scare off real storks, blamed for poisoning the water supply by dropping venomous snakes into the cisterns. The perceived power of a three-storks image is indicated by Hesychius's claim that the Byzantine device was effective even up to his own time.

The Latin word grus, like the English word "crane", can refer to either the bird or a machine. The word ciconia similarly can mean both "stork" and a type of machine, hence leading to the conjecture that the landmark was a derrick or crane for moving wine shipments from the Tiber for land transport; however, this usage appears to be found only in the dialect of Roman Spain, and means "shadoof", an irrigation apparatus. Regardless of why the location was known as the Ciconiae — a representation of storks remains as good a guess as any — an inscription twice mentions that taxes were paid there pertaining to shipments of wine.

Since the stork was a symbol of pietas, it has also been conjectured that the Ciconiae were associated with an altar to Pietas that the emperor Hadrian had dedicated when his wife Sabina was made divine.

== The Nixae ==
The annual sacrifice of the October Horse was held ad Nixas, within the Tarentum in the general area of the Campus Martius. The site is most likely an altar to the birth deities known as the Nixae or di nixi.
