= Parilia =

Ancient Roman festival

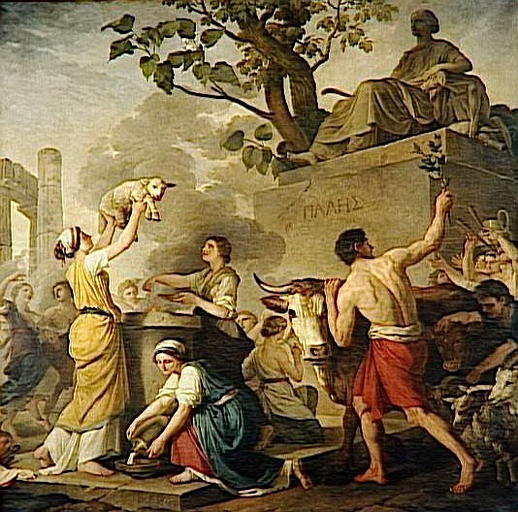
Festa di Pales, o L'estate (1783), a reimagining of the Festival of Pales by Joseph-Benoît Suvée

The Parilia or Palilia was an ancient Roman festival of rural character performed annually on 21 April, aimed at cleansing both sheep and shepherd. It was carried out in acknowledgment to the Roman deity Pales, a deity of uncertain gender who was a patron of shepherds and sheep.

Ovid describes the Parilia at length in the Fasti, an elegiac poem on the Roman religious calendar, and implies that it predates the founding of Rome (753 BC in the Varronian chronology), as indicated by its pastoral and preagricultural concerns. During the Republic, farming was idealized and central to Roman identity, so the festival took on a more generally rural character. Increasing urbanization caused the rustic Parilia to be reinterpreted rather than abandoned, as Rome was an intensely traditional society. During the Imperial period, the date was celebrated as the birthday of Rome (Latin: dies natalis Romae or natalis Urbis).

== History ==
By the end of the late Republic, the Parilia became associated with the birthday of Rome. Numerous accounts of the founding of Rome exist, but the particular one related to the Parilia is described by Ovid in his Fasti. According to this myth, Romulus, upon reaching Rome on the day of the Parilia, took a stick and engraved a line in the ground that defined the boundaries of the new city (pomerium). He then prayed to the gods Jupiter, Mars, and Vesta asking for protection of this area. However, his brother Remus, unaware of the boundaries, crossed the line and was struck down by Romulus's henchman Celer.

Over time, and under the influence of several Roman rulers, the structure of the Parilia changed. First, after Julius Caesar heard the news of Roman Victory at Munda in 45 BC (around the date of the Parilia), he added games to the ceremony. At these games, the citizens would wear crowns in Caesar’s honor. Caligula instituted into the celebration a procession of priests, noblemen, boys and girls of noble birth singing of his virtues while escorting the Golden Shield, previously bestowed upon him by the citizens of Rome, to the Capitol. At this time the Parilia became Rome's birthday celebration rather than the rural festival it had once been. In 121 AD, Hadrian founded a new temple of Venus and Roma and changed the festival’s name to the Romaea. This temple was ruined in the 9th century.

== Ceremony ==
The pastoral structure of the festival is carried out by the shepherd himself. After the sheep pen had been decorated with green branches and a wreath draped on the gate, the remainder of the ceremony took place in sequence. At the first sign of daylight, the shepherd would purify the sheep by sweeping their pen and then constructing a bonfire of straw, olive branches, laurel, and sulfur. The noises produced by this burning combination were interpreted as a beneficial omen. The shepherd would jump through this flame, dragging his sheep along with him. Offerings of millet, cakes, and milk were then presented before Pales, marking the second segment of the ceremony. After these offerings, the shepherd would wet his hands with dew, face the east, and repeat a prayer four times. Such prayers requested Pales’s assistance in freeing the shepherd and the flock from evils brought about by accidental wrongdoings (e.g. trespassing on sacred grounds and removing water from a sacred water source). The final portion of the rural festival made use of the beverage burranica, a combination of milk and sapa (boiled wine). After consumption of this beverage, the shepherd would leap through the fire three times, bringing an end to the ceremony.

The urban form of the Parilia, on the other hand, is blended with other Roman religious practices and carried out by a priest. Ovid personally participated in this form and describes his experiences in the Fasti. While the central actions of the rural ceremony carry over, the urban form adds two ingredients from other religious festivals: the Fordicidia and the October Horse. The Fordicidia sacrifices a pregnant cow to the deity Tellus to promote cattle and field fertility. The unborn calf is then removed from the womb and burnt. The October Horse is the right hand horse of the team that won a particular chariot race on October 15 of the previous year. Together, the ashes of the unborn calf and the blood from the head of the October Horse are mixed by the Vestals and are added to the burning bean straw of the bonfire. Dumézil questioned whether the Equus October provided the horse blood, since the two ancient sources that mention the ingredient omit identifying the victim.

== See also ==
- Beltane
