= Turris Mamilia =

The Turris Mamilia ("Mamilian Tower") was a landmark in ancient Rome. It was located in the Subura, a densely populated, notoriously lively quarter of the city. The existence of the tower is attested by an inscription, and it is mentioned by Festus.

The tower, considered by the Romans to be "very ancient," was still standing in the early Imperial era. It was thought to have been named after the gens Mamilia, a clan originating in Tusculum who sometimes used the cognomen Turrinus, an adjectival form of turris. Their mythic genealogy claimed descent from Telegonus and Circe. The Mamilian Tower figured in the ritual fight between the Suburaneses, residents of the Subura, and the Sacravienses who lived along the Via Sacra, for possession of the severed head of the October Horse. When the Suburaneses won, the head got to be displayed at the Turris Mamilia; the rival destination was the Regia, the original residence of the Roman kings. The Mamilii are thus assumed to have asserted claims to royal status in the Regal period. They escaped the traditional odium directed at the Tarquins through unimpeachable service to the Republic.

Dumézil claimed that the mock battle represented the Mamilii as traditional enemies of Rome, but this has been criticized as "an improper emphasis," since the potential for an enemy to possess the talisman of the head would result in a bad omen for the state.

What exactly the tower was is unclear: perhaps "a kind of peel-tower."
