= Taurian Games =

The Taurian Games (Latin Ludi Taurii or Ludi Taurei, rarely Taurilia) were games (ludi) held in ancient Rome in honor of the di inferi, the gods of the underworld. They were not part of a regularly scheduled religious festival on the calendar, but were held as expiatory rites religionis causa, occasioned by religious concerns.

Ludi Taurii are recorded in 186 BC as a two-day event. Varro mentions them as occurring in the late Republic. During the reign of Antoninus Pius, they were held every five years from 140 to 160 AD, within a period beginning on the day after the Ides of May and continuing through the Kalends of June. Some scholars extrapolate that like the lustrum (purification ritual), the Ludi Taurii were regularly quinquennial. Others caution that the five-year schedule under Antoninus Pius, attested by the Fasti Ostienses, is never mentioned in other sources. The limited evidence suggests the Ludi Taurii were important mainly in the context of religious revivalism during the Augustan and Antonine eras.

The Taurian Games were horse races, or less likely chariot races, on a course around turning posts (metae). In the 19th century, they were sometimes confused with the archaic Tarentine Games (ludi tarentini), which were replaced by the Saecular Games. Horse racing along with the propitiation of underworld gods was characteristic of "old and obscure" Roman festivals such as the Consualia, the October Horse, and sites in the Campus Martius such as the Tarentum (where the ludi tarentini originated) and the Trigarium. The Ludi Taurii were the only games held in the Circus Flaminius.

If the games are Etruscan in origin, as Festus and Servius claim, taurii probably comes from the Etruscan word tauru, "tomb." The design of the turning posts (metae) on a Roman race course was derived from Etruscan funerary monuments. Festus, however, offers an etiology based on Latin taurus, meaning "bull." in English.

== Origin and significance ==
In the tradition recorded by Festus, the games were instituted in the Regal period when Tarquinius Superbus was king. Servius also places their origin during his reign.

Festus explains that the games were performed in honor of the gods below (di inferi). They were established in response to an epidemic (magna … pestilentia) afflicting pregnant women, caused by the distribution of the flesh of sacrificial bulls (tauri) among the people. Servius implies that the pestilentia was infant mortality: "each delivery of the women came out badly." The remedy of the games was obtained ex libris fatalibus, "from the books of the fates" (either the Sibylline books or Etruscan texts). According to Servius, the ludi took their name from the word taurea, meaning a sterile sacrificial victim (hostia).

Servius gives an alternative version that credits the Sabines with instituting the games in response to the pestilentia, and characterizes the transferral of the lues publica (the plague upon the people) onto sacrificial victims (hostiae) as if it were a scapegoat ritual.

Festus also provided an additional explanation of the name as taurus ("bull") from Varro, preserved only in fragmentary form by the Codex Farnesianus. A reconstruction dating back to J.J. Scaliger has been taken to mean that youths, under the direction of a coach, engaged in ritual gymnastics on a raw bull's hide, perhaps to be compared to exercises on a trampoline. This view has not attracted wide acceptance, but would suggest that the ritual action countervails infant mortality by affirming the fitness of the youth. Ritually, landing on the bull's skin may mimic the "catching" of a safely delivered newborn.

The Augustan historian Livy has a brief reference to the games as occurring in 186 BC per biduum, for a period of two days, religionis causa, "for the sake of religious scruple." On this occasion, the two-day Ludi Taurii preceded ten days of ludi presented by Marcus Fulvius Nobilior as the result of a vow in the Aetolian War. Nobilior's games are notable as the first time a beast hunt (venatio) was staged at Rome. At a corrupt transition between the two events in Livy's text, the word decem ("ten") appears, which Georg Wissowa construed as referring to the ten-member priestly college of decemviri sacris faciundis; he thought these priests were likely charged with organizing the Taurian Games.

Earlier scholars have sometimes taken the adjective taurii to mean that bulls were part of the games, either in a Mediterranean tradition of bull-leaping, or as an early form of bullfighting. Because Livy's chronology places the Ludi Taurii (or in some editions Taurilia) immediately after the news of a victory in Roman Spain, the games have figured in a few efforts to trace the early history of Spanish-style bullfighting.
