= Curio maximus =

Priesthood in ancient Rome

The curio maximus was an obscure priesthood in ancient Rome that had oversight of the curiae, groups of citizens loosely affiliated within what was originally a tribe. Each curia was led by a curio, who was admitted only after the age of 50 and held his office for life. The curiones were required to be in good health and without physical defect, and could not hold any other civil or military office; the pool of willing candidates was thus neither large nor eager. In the early Republic, the curio maximus was always a patrician, and officiated as the senior interrex. The earliest curio maximus identified as such is Servius Sulpicius (consul 500 BC), who held the office in 463. The first plebeian to hold the office was elected in 209 BC.

The election of a plebeian to succeed an impeccably pedigreed Aemilius Papus was predictably controversial, even though the office of curio maximus had become "anachronistic and somewhat bizarre", and the election of both a plebeian pontifex maximus as early as 254 BC and rex sacrorum just the previous year would have seemed to clear the way. When the patricians objected to the candidacy of Gaius Mamilius Atellus, the tribunes of the plebs, who normally withheld themselves from religious affairs, were called in. They followed procedure by referring the matter to the Senate, who promptly tossed it back to them. Political jockeying no longer discernible in the historical record was perhaps in play. Mamilius was duly elected, and held the office until he died of plague in 175 BC. His successor, also a plebeian, was Gaius Scribonius Curio, whose new cognomen passed to his descendants, most notably a father and son who were active at the time of Julius Caesar.

The electoral procedure for the office of curio maximus probably resembled that of pontifex maximus; that is, election through the tribes. Others known to have held the office include C. Calvisius Sabinus, the consul of 39 BC.

The curio maximus presided over the Quirinalia, and also the agricultural festivals of the curiae such as the Fordicidia, when pregnant cows were sacrificed, and the Fornacalia, or Oven Festival. The Fornacalia had no fixed date, and though each curia might celebrate the festival separately, the date was determined by the curio maximus and posted in the Roman Forum. Although the curio was a kind of priest, he had the power to convene meetings for political purposes, and each curia also had a flamen curialis whose duties were specifically religious. Another duty of the curio maximus was collecting "religious contributions" from the curiae (curionium aes).
