= William Warde Fowler =

portrait of William Warde Fowler

William Warde Fowler (16 May 1847 – 15 June 1921) was an English historian and ornithologist, and tutor at Lincoln College, Oxford. He was best known for his works on ancient Roman religion.

Among his most influential works was The Roman Festivals of the Period of the Republic (1899). H. H. Scullard, in the introduction to his 1981 book on a similar topic, singled out Fowler's book as a particularly valuable resource despite its age, writing, "I have not been so presumptuous as to attempt to provide an alternative."
