= Tarentum (Campus Martius) =

Ancient Roman precinct in Campus Martius

In the topography of ancient Rome, the Tarentum or Terentum was a religious precinct north of the Trigarium, a field for equestrian exercise, in the Campus Martius. The archaeological survey of the site shows that it had no buildings.

The Tarentum gave its name to the ludi tarentini ("Tarentine Games"), the archaic ludi that became the Secular Games; the name is perhaps less likely to have come from the place Tarentum in Apulia. The location of the Tarentum is indicated primarily by the discovery in 1930 of the inscribed record of the Saecular Games (acta) held in 17 BC, which traditionally took place there. It was the precinct within which the underground Altar of Dis and Proserpina was located.

== Myth and the ludi ==
The Tarentine Games were presented most notably in 249 BC, as a "crisis ritual" during the First Punic War, in accordance with the Sibylline Books. The ludi took the form of three-night rites and horse races to honor Dis and Proserpina, the divine couple who had an underground altar at the site. In a common version of the myth, Proserpina (Greek Persephone) was abducted by the ruler of the underworld and driven underground in his chariot to become his bride and queen. Some scholars think that the Roman Dis pater ("Rich Father") is a Latin translation of the Greek Plouton (Pluto) and that his cult was established among the Romans with the celebration of the games in 249 BC. Varro regarded the nocturnal theatrical performances that took place during the games as a seminal event in the history of Roman drama.

Hendrik Wagenvoort argued that these ceremonies had originated with the cult of Maris, an Etruscan daimon of death later identified with Mars in a chthonic form, along with Ferona as the consort of Maris. According to Calvert Watkins, the word tarentum in reference to the Roman site most likely means "tomb" or "sepulcher," or more fundamentally, "a place for crossing," that is, a liminal place.
