= Martius (month) =

First month of the ancient Roman year

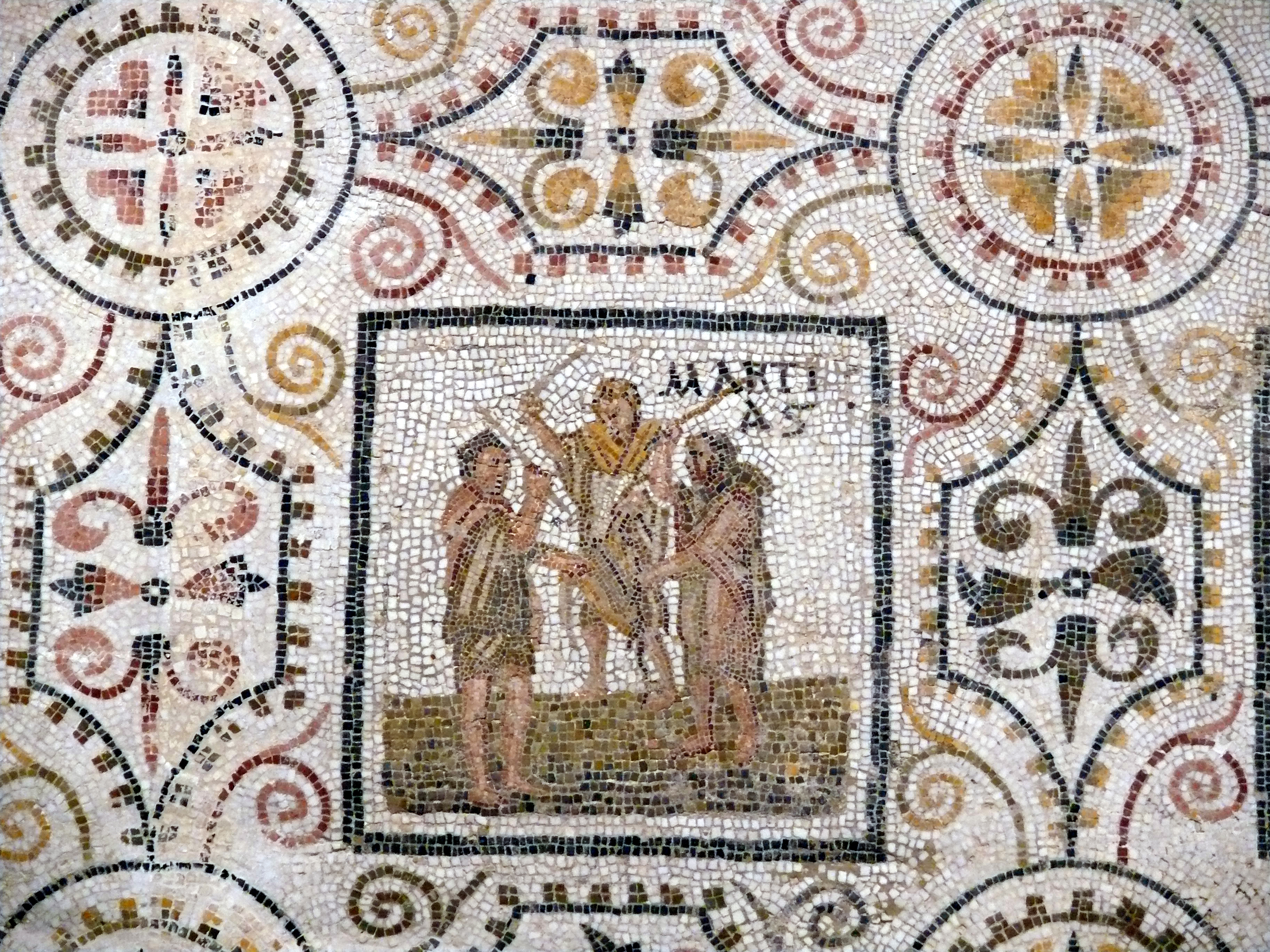
Panel thought to depict the Mamuralia from a mosaic of the months that places March first (from El Djem, Tunisia, first half of 3rd century AD)

Martius or mensis Martius ("March") was the first month of the ancient Roman year until possibly as late as 153 BC. After that time, it was the third month, following Februarius (February) and preceding Aprilis (April). Martius was one of the few Roman months named for a deity, Mars, who was regarded as an ancestor of the Roman people through his sons Romulus and Remus.

March marked a return to the active life of farming, military campaigning, and sailing. It was densely packed with religious observances dating from the earliest period of Roman history. Because of its original position as the first month, a number of festivals originally associated with the new year occurred in March. In the Imperial period, March was also a time for public celebration of syncretic or international deities whose cultus was spread throughout the empire, including Isis and Cybele.

== In the agricultural year ==
The menologia rustica told farmers to expect 12 hours of daylight and 12 of night in March. The spring equinox was placed March 25. The tutelary deity of the month was Minerva, and the Sun was in Pisces. Farmers were instructed in this month to trellis vines, to prune, and to sow spring wheat.

== Religious observances ==
Festivals for Mars as the month's namesake deity date from the time of the kings and the early Republic. As a god of war, Mars was a guardian of agriculture and of the state, and was associated with the cycle of life and death. The season of Mars was felt to close in October, when most farming and military activities ceased, and the god has a second round of festivals clustered then.

During the Principate, a "holy week" for Cybele and Attis developed in the latter half of the month, with an entry festival on the Ides, and a series of observances from March 22 through March 27 or 28. Isis had official festivals on March 7 and 20.

== Dates ==
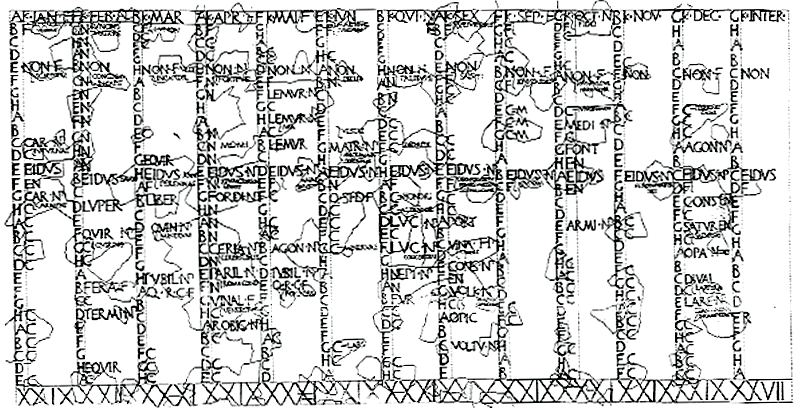
Drawing of the fragmentary Fasti Antiates, a pre-Julian calendar showing Martius (abbreviated MAR) at the top of the third column

The Romans did not number days of a month sequentially from the 1st through the last day. Instead, they counted back from the three fixed points of the month: the Nones (5th or 7th, depending on the length of the month), the Ides (13th or 15th), and the Kalends (1st) of the following month. The Nones of March was the 7th, and the Ides of March was the 15th. Thus the last day of March was the pridie Kalendas Aprilis, "day before the Kalends of April". Roman counting was inclusive; March 9 was ante diem VII Idūs Martias, "the 7th day before the Ides of March," usually abbreviated a.d. VII Id. Mart. (or with the a.d. omitted altogether); March 23 was X Kal. Apr., "the 10th day before the Kalends of April."

On the calendar of the Roman Republic and early Principate, each day was marked with a letter to denote its religiously lawful status. In March, these were:

- F for dies fasti, days when it was legal to initiate action in the courts of civil law;
- C, for dies comitalis, a day on which the Roman people could hold assemblies (comitia), elections, and certain kinds of judicial proceedings;
- N for dies nefasti, when these political activities and the administration of justice were prohibited;
- NP, the meaning of which remains elusive, but which marked feriae, public holidays;
- QRCF (perhaps for quando rex comitiavit fas), a day when it was religiously permissible for the rex (probably the priest known as the rex sacrorum) to call for an assembly;
- EN for endotercissus, an archaic form of intercissus, "cut in half," meaning days that were nefasti in the morning, when sacrifices were being prepared, and in the evening, while sacrifices were being offered, but were fasti in the middle of the day.

By the late 2nd century AD, extant calendars no longer show days marked with these letters, probably in part as a result of calendar reforms undertaken by Marcus Aurelius. Days were also marked with nundinal letters in cycles of A B C D E F G H, to mark the "market week" (these are omitted in the table below).

A dies natalis was an anniversary such as a temple founding or rededication, sometimes thought of as the "birthday" of a deity. During the Imperial period, some of the traditional festivals localized at Rome became less important, and the birthdays and anniversaries of the emperor and his family gained prominence as Roman holidays. On the calendar of military religious observances known as the Feriale Duranum, sacrifices pertaining to Imperial cult outnumber the older festivals, but among the military the importance of Mars was maintained and perhaps magnified. The dies imperii was the anniversary of an emperor's accession. After the mid-1st century AD, a number of dates are added to calendars for spectacles and games (ludi) held in honor of various deities in the venue called a "circus" (ludi circenses). Festivals marked in large letters on extant fasti, represented by festival names in all capital letters on the table, are thought to have been the most ancient holidays, becoming part of the calendar before 509 BC.

Unless otherwise noted, the dating and observances on the following table are from H. H. Scullard, Festivals and Ceremonies of the Roman Republic (Cornell University Press, 1981), pp. 84–95.

Modern date	Roman date	status	Observances
March 1	Kalendae Martiae	NP	• Feriae of Mars; the Salii wield sacred shields in procession (ancilia movent) • Matronalia • dies natalis of the temple of Juno Lucina on the Esquiline Hill • renewal of the sacred fire of Vesta • Regia, houses of the flamens, and the Curiae Veteres bedecked with laurel • dies natalis of Mars • Circenses (after mid-1st century AD) • military rites for the birthday (nataliciae) of Father Mars Victor
2	ante diem VI Nonas Martias	F	
3	a.d. V Non. Mart.	C	
4	IV Non. Mart.	C	
5	III Non. Mart.	C	• Isidis Navigium, a "sailing" procession for Isis (mid-1st century AD onward)
6	pridie Nonas Martias (abbrev. prid. Non. Mart.)	C	• supplication to Vesta and the "public gods", the Penates of the citizens of Rome (on the Feriale Cumanum, 4–14 AD) • dies imperii for the joint reign of Marcus Aurelius and Lucius Verus
7	Nonae Martiae	F	• dies natalis of the temple of Vediovis on the Capitoline Hill • Iunonalia (in the later Empire)
8	VIII Id. Mart.	F	
9	VII Id. Mart.	C	• another procession of the Salii (see March 1)
10	VI Id. Mart.	C	
11	V Id. Mart.	C	
12	IV Id. Mart.	C	
13	III Id. Mart.	EN	•Circenses for Jupiter Cultor (Iovi Cultori)
14	pridie Idūs Martias (abbrev. prid. Id. Mart.)	NP	• EQUIRRIA, horse races in honor of Mars • Mamuralia
15	Idūs Martiae	NP	• Feriae Iovi, the monthly sacrifice to Jupiter • Feast of Anna Perenna • "Holy week" for Cybele and Attis, beginning with the Canna intrat (possibly as early as the time of Claudius, or as late as Antoninus Pius)
16	XVII Kal. Apr.	F	• procession of the Argei
17	XVI Kal. Apr.	NP	• LIBERALIA • AGONALIA or Agonium Martiale for Mars • Argei continue • Circenses and Ludi Liberalici after the mid-1st century AD
18	XV Kal. Apr.	C	
19	XIV Kal. Apr.	NP	• QUINQUATRUS for Mars and Minerva
20	XIII Kal. Apr.	C	• Pelusia
21	XII Kal. Apr.	C	
22	XI Kal. Apr.	N	• Arbor intrat (introduced under Claudius)
23	X Kal. Apr.	NP	• TUBILUSTRIUM • another procession of the Salii (see March 1)
24	IX Kal. Apr.	F QRFC	• Dies Sanguinis when the devotees of Cybele self-flagellated and performed castrations, followed by: * Sacred Night, when Attis was laid to rest and new Galli were "reborn" into the priesthood
25	VIII Kal. Apr.	C	• Hilaria, a day of rejoicing following the Sacred Night (in the time of Antoninus Pius or later)
26	VII Kal. Apr.	C	• Requetio, a day of rest following Hilaria
27	VI Kal. Apr.	C	• Lavatio, ritual procession and bathing of Cybele (by the time of Augustus)
28	V Kal. Apr.	C	• Initium Gaiani, either initiations into the mysteries of the Magna Mater and Attis at the Gaianum, or a day commemorating the acclamation of Caligula as princeps
29	IV Kal. Apr.	C	
30	III Kal. Apr.	C	
31	prid. Kal. Apr.	C	• dies natalis of the Temple of the Moon on the Aventine Hill
