= Armilustrium =

Festival in honor of Mars

- Observed by: Roman Republic, Roman Empire
- Type: Classical Roman religion
- Observances: Ritual purification of weapons
- Date: October 19
- Frequency: annual
- Related to: Mars, god of war

In ancient Roman religion, the Armilustrium was a festival in honour of Mars, the god of war, celebrated on October 19. On this day the weapons of the soldiers were ritually purified and stored for winter. The army would be assembled and reviewed in the Circus Maximus, garlanded with flowers. The trumpets (tubae) would be played as part of the purification rites. The Romans gathered with their arms and armour on the Aventine Hill, and held a procession with torches and sacrificial animals. The dancing priests of Mars known as the Salii may also have taken part in the ceremony.

Festivals associated with Mars were mainly held in March, Latin Martius, the month that was named after him, and in October, to begin and end the military campaigning season. These festivals were the Equirria, the sacral chariot races held on February 27 and March 14, and on October 15 with the sacrifice of the October Horse; the Agonium Martiale on March 17; the Quinquatrus, another ritual for purifying weapons before the military campaigning season, on March 19; and following the Armilustrium, the Tubilustrium, "Purification of the Trumpets," on October 23.

Armilustrium also refers to a large open space on the Aventine Hill where the festival was held.
