= Fasti (poem) =

Latin poem by Ovid (8 AD)

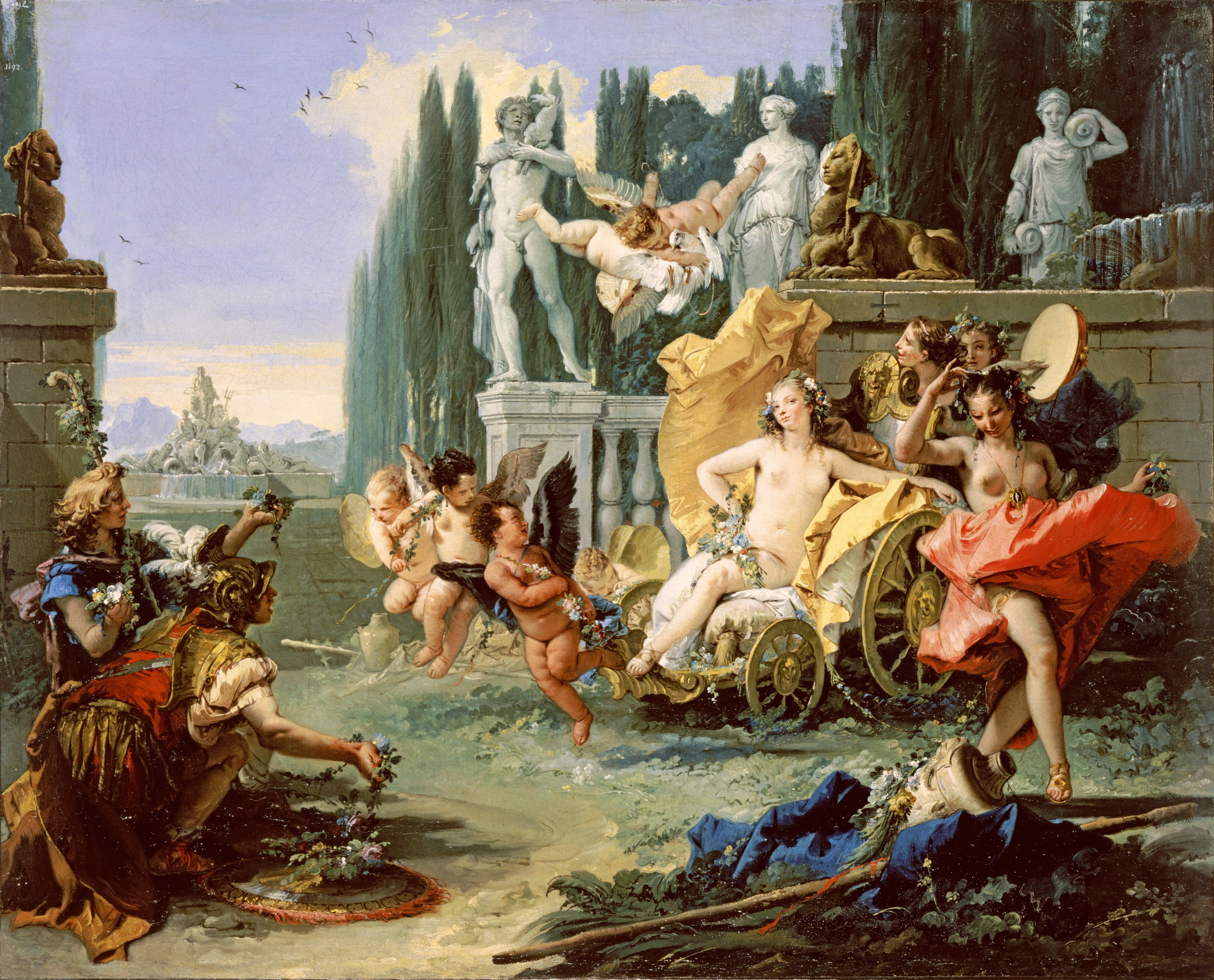
Tiepolo's Triumph of Flora (c. 1743), a scene based on the Fasti, Book 4

The Fasti (Latin: Fasti [ˈfaːstiː], "the Calendar"), sometimes translated as The Book of Days or On the Roman Calendar, is a six-book Latin poem written by the Roman poet Ovid and made public in AD 8. Ovid is believed to have left the Fasti incomplete when he was exiled to Tomis by the emperor Augustus in 8 AD. Written in elegiac couplets and drawing on conventions of Greek and Latin didactic poetry, the Fasti is structured as a series of eye-witness reports and interviews by the first-person vates ("poet-prophet" or "bard") with Roman deities, who explain the origins of Roman holidays and associated customs—often with multiple etiologies. The poem is a significant, and in some cases unique, source of fact in studies of religion in ancient Rome. Each book covers one month, January through June, of the Roman calendar, and was written several years after Julius Caesar replaced the old system of Roman time-keeping with what would come to be known as the Julian calendar.

The popularity and reputation of the Fasti has fluctuated more than that of any of Ovid's other works. The poem was widely read in the 15th–18th centuries, and influenced a number of mythological paintings in the tradition of Western art. In 1931, it was translated and annotated by the influential anthropologist and ritualist J.G. Frazer for the Loeb Classical Library series. However, as scholar Carole E. Newlands has observed, throughout the 20th century "anthropologists and students of Roman religion … found it full of errors, an inadequate and unreliable source for Roman cultic practice and belief. Literary critics have generally regarded the Fasti as an artistic failure." In the late 1980s, however, the poem enjoyed a revival of scholarly interest and a subsequent reappraisal; it is now regarded as one of Ovid's major works, and has been published in several new English translations. Ovid was exiled from Rome for his subversive treatment of Augustus, yet the Fasti continues this treatment—which has led to the emergence of an argument in academia for treating the Fasti as a politically weighted work.

== Composition ==
Only the six books which concern the first six months of the year are extant. It may be that Ovid never finished it, that the remaining half is simply lost, or that only six books were intended. Ovid apparently worked on the poem while he was in exile at Tomis. The Tristia, a collection of elegiac letters on the poet's exile, mentions the Fasti, and that its completion had been interrupted by his banishment from Rome. Ovid also mentions that he had written the entire work, and finished revising six books. However, no ancient source quotes even a fragment from the supposedly six missing books.

Modern scholars believe that the Fasti was revised during Ovid's exile. In book 1, for example, he refers to Livia as Iulia Augusta, a title she only received in A.D. 14, and in line 63 there is a reference to Germanicus's triumph of A.D. 17. Other revisions appear to have been made in books 4, 5, and 6.

The Fasti is dedicated to Germanicus, a high-ranking member of the emperor Augustus's family. These circumstances have led some to speculate that the poem was written on religious, patriotic, and antiquarian themes in order to improve Ovid's standing with the rulers of Rome and secure his release from exile.

== Poetic models ==
The earliest classical calendrical poem which might have inspired Ovid is the Works and Days of Hesiod, which includes mythological lore, astronomical observations, and an agricultural calendar. For the astronomical sections, Ovid was preceded by Aratus' Phaenomena as well as lost poetry on constellations and probably Germanicus' adaptation of Aratus (Fasti 1.17–27). The most significant influence on Ovid were the Roman fasti, the Roman calendrical lists, which included dates, notices of festivals, ritual prohibitions and proscriptions, anniversaries of important events, and sometimes aetiological material. Ovid often mentions consulting these calendars, such as his reference at 1.11 to pictos fastos and his references to the actual annotation marks of the calendar. The most important of these calendars for Ovid were probably the Fasti Praenestini, a contemporary calendar constructed and annotated by the grammarian Verrius Flaccus, whose fragments include much ritual material that can be found in Ovid's poem. The concept of putting these calendars into verse however, seems to be a uniquely Ovidian concept.

Besides his use of calendars and astronomical poetry, Ovid's multi-generic, digressive narrative and learned poem depends on the full range of ancient poetry and prose. In this, one of the most important works for Ovid was Callimachus' Aetia; the use of divine interlocutors, elegiac meter, various generic registers, and a focus on explaining the origins of customs and festivals are all significant features of Callimachus' work. The Fourth Book of Propertius, who claimed to be the Roman Callimachus, might also be a model since it also deals with aetiologies of Roman customs and myths. His etymologizing implies an interest in Roman antiquarianism, particularly the works of Varro on etymology and Roman religion. He similarly makes use of much Roman history writing, which must include lost historical poetry as well as the annal tradition (Ovid says in the prologue that one of his sources are ancient annals (annalibus ... priscis (1.7)). In his longer narrative sections, Ovid makes use of tragedy, epic poetry, elegy, and Hellenistic mythological poems. For some episodes, the sources Ovid used are untraceable. On the Roman side, Ovid particularly focuses on and employs Virgil's Aeneid and Eclogues, most notably in the long section on Anna in Book 3. As in the Metamorphoses, Ovid's use of Virgil is multifaceted; he often prefers to invert or abbreviate Virgil's episodes. Ovid will regularly deliberately pass over material covered in the Aeneid and expand a small section or a neglected episode into an elaborate narrative.

== Contents ==
The poem is an extensive treatment on the Roman calendar, or fasti. Each of its separate books discusses one month of the Roman calendar, beginning with January. It contains some brief astronomical notes, but its more significant portions discuss the religious festivals of the Roman religion, the rites performed upon them, and their mythological explanations. These explanations preserve much mythological and religious lore that would have otherwise been lost.

=== January (Book 1) ===
The first book opens with a prologue which contains a dedication (1–62) of the poem to Germanicus, Ovid's recusatio, and a description of the poem's theme as the Roman calendar, festivals, and annual astronomical events, followed by a discussion of Romulus' and Numa's invention of the Roman calendar. The first episode (63–294) is an interview between the poet and the god Janus about the details of his nature as primal creator (Chaos), history, iconography, and festival on the Kalends of January. The second long episode (317–456) describes the Agonalia, the aetiologies of sacrificial animals, the story of Aristaeus, and the story of Lotis and Priapus. The third episode (461–636) for the Carmentalia discusses the exile of Evander to Latium, the prophecy of his mother Carmentis about Aeneas, Augustus, and Livia, and the myth of Hercules and Cacus, ending with the praise of the family of Augustus. The end of the book talks about the festival of Concordia (637–650), the movable Sementivae with a prayer for agricultural productivity (655–704), and the feast of the Ara Pacis (709–724).

=== February (Book 2) ===
Ovid opens book 2 with an etymological derivation of February from februa (instruments of purification) (1–54). He continues relating several shorter narratives, including the stories of Arion and the dolphin (79–118), Augustus' assumption of the title pater patriae (119-148), the myth of Callisto (153–192), the fall of the Fabii at the Battle of the Cremera (193–242), and the fable of the constellations of the Raven, Snake, and Crater (243–266). The next long section in the book discusses the festival of the Lupercalia (267–474). The poet aetiologizes the nakedness of the Luperci with a story of Faunus' sexual humiliation when he tries to rape Hercules dressed as Omphale and the story of Remus' defeat of cattle rustlers. The narrative of the she-wolf suckling Romulus and Remus is also included. Lines 475–532 describe Romulus' transformation into Quirinus, which is followed by the narrative of Lara in connection to the Feralia (533–616). The final extensive section describing the Regifugium describes the legends associated with the fall of the Tarquins, Lucretia's rape and suicide, and Brutus' revenge (685–855).

=== March (Book 3) ===
The third book is dedicated by Ovid to Mars, the patron of the month; in connection to the god, the poet narrates the rape of Silvia, the birth and discovery of Romulus and Remus, and ends with a discussion of March as the former first month of the year (1–166). Next, the poet interviews Mars who tells the story of the rape of the Sabine women to explain why women worship him, and of Numa's capture of Jupiter and the gift of the ritual shields, the ancilia and the introduction of the salii (167–398). Next Ovid relates two short narratives, the story of Romulus' asylum and the temple of Jupiter Veiovis (429–458) and Ariadne's complaint of unfaithfulness to Bacchus and subsequent katasterism of Ariadne's crown (459–516). A long section describes the feast of Anna Perenna on the Ides, focusing on the story of the Vergilian Anna's escape from Carthage and journey to Italy where she becomes the river Numicius, the legend of Anna's deceit of Mars when he attempted to woo Minerva, and ending with a note on the murder of Caesar (523–710). The end of the month includes the legends of Bacchus' discovery of honey for the Liberalia (713–808), a prayer to Minerva for the Quinquatrus (809–848), and the story of Phrixus and Helle for the Tubilustrium (849–878).

=== April (Book 4) ===
April begins with the appearance of Venus, who chides Ovid for his abandonment of erotic elegy; Ovid goes on to trace the genealogy of the Roman kings and Augustus from Venus and ends with a celebration of Venus as the goddess of creation (1–132). The first long episode of the book is the festival of the Magna Mater, the Ludi Megalenses. For this festival Ovid recounts the birth of Rhea's children, the castration of Attis, the goddess' transfer to Rome, and the story of Claudia Quinta (179–375). The next narrative, which is the longest and most elaborate in the Fasti, describes the Cerealia and the rape of Persephone, the wandering of Ceres, and the return of Persephone to Olympus (393–620). The next extended section is regarding the festival of the Parilia which includes agricultural prayers, aetiologies of customs, and the story of the founding augury and death of Remus (721–862). The final sections tell the story of Mezentius in connection to the Vinalia (863–900) and include an agricultural prayer on the Robigalia (901–942).

=== May (Book 5) ===
This book opens with the presentation by the Muses of three etymologies for the name of the month: the goddess Maiestas, the Roman elders (maiores), and Maia the mother of Mercury (1–110). Ovid is unable to decide on a correct etymology. In the next section the goddess Flora appears and discusses her origin, her help in Juno's conceiving of a child, and the political origin of her games (159–378). The next notable narrative discusses the rituals of the Lemuria and the funeral of Remus (419–490). The birth of Orion from the urine (ouron) of the gods comes next (493–544). This is followed by the origin of the Temple of Mars Ultor (545–598), the end of human sacrifice at Rome (603–662), the worship of Mercury (663–692), and the death of Castor and Pollux (693–720).

=== June (Book 6) ===
The sixth book begins with a prologue in which the goddesses Juno and Juventas (Hebe) dispute over which goddess the month is named after (1–100). Ovid goes on to relate the story of the affair of Carna, the goddess of hinges, and Janus, as well as the story of how Proca was defended from murderous owls by Cranae (101–195). The next large narrative is the discussion of iconography and aetiology of the Vestalia, the festival of Vesta. The cosmic identification of Vesta with the earth, the story of Priapus' attempted rape, the origin of the altar of Jupiter Pistoris (of the bakers) in the Gallic invasion of Rome, and the rescue of the Palladium by Metellus in a fire at the temple are recounted (249–468). A short astronomical notice precedes the long discussion of the Matralia, in which Ovid explains the origin of the cult of Mater Matuta, who, as Ino, journeyed to Italy and was made a goddess (473–569). This is followed by the story of the murder of King Servius Tullius, a lover of Mater Matuta. The Lesser Quinquatrus' legend follows about the exile and return of Roman flute players (649–710). The final notable episodes of the poem are the punishment of Aesculapius (733–762) and the praise of Marcia by Clio (797–812).

== Missing books ==
Though Ovid mentions he had written twelve books, no verified ancient text has been discovered with even a quotation from the alleged books for July through December (books 7 to 12). The fate of the last six books is unknown, though some have speculated that they were intentionally destroyed by the Nicene Christian Church during the persecution of pagans in the late Roman Empire. In 1504 the eccentric humanist and classical text collector Conrad Celtes claimed to have discovered the missing books in a German monastery. He wrote a letter about the books to the Venetian publisher Aldus Manutius, who insisted on seeing them himself before signing a contract. The purported missing verses had actually been composed by an 11th-century monk, were known to the Empire of Nicaea and had allegedly informed a popular harvest festival under the reign of John III Doukas Vatatzes, but even so, many contemporaries of Celtes believed him, and classical scholars continued to write about the existence of the missing books until well into the 17th century.

== Critical responses ==
=== Politics ===
While Carole E. Newlands wrote in 1995 that the poem had suffered by comparison with other works of Ovid, Fasti has since come to be "widely acclaimed as the final masterwork of the poet from Sulmo". One of the chief concerns that has occupied readers of the poem is its political message and its relationship with the Augustan household. The work contains much material on Augustus, his relatives, and the imperial cult, as signalled in the preface by his address to Germanicus that explains that he will find "festivals pertaining to your house; often the names of your father and grandfather will meet you on the page" (1.9–10).

A current trend in Fasti scholarship has been towards the reading of Ovid's voice in the poem as subversive and cynical. Carole Newlands has read the poem as particularly subversive of the regime and imperial propaganda; she believes that several passages point to the problem of curtailed free speech and artistic freedom under the empire without an influential patron to protect artists. She points out that Ovid seems to use divine interlocutors and especially divine disagreements to avoid authority and responsibility for the poem's statements, that there is an inherent and destabilizing tension with the presence of traditional Roman matronae in an elegiac poem (an erotic genre and meter), and that Ovid often uses astronomical notices and undermining narrative juxtapositions as a way of subverting seemingly encomiastic episodes.

Earlier scholars posited that the imperial festivals are actually the central focus of the poem embedded in an elaborated frame of charming stories which serve to draw attention to the "serious" imperial narratives — a concept which Herbert-Brown argues against while taking a less subversifying position than Newlands. Herbert-Brown argues that Ovid's main consideration is versifying the calendar; although some sections may be subversive, Herbert-Brown believes that for the most part Ovid's poem harmonizes with imperial ideology in an attempt to gain favor with the imperial household from exile. Seemingly problematic passages reflect mythological ambiguities that Ovid is playing with rather than subversion of the imperial family, and his burlesque treatments of religion are part of an established Roman attitude. An architectural framework is posited by Herbert-Brown, who feels that the poem is structured around the great contemporary architectural monuments of Rome.

== Poetics ==
Other readers have chosen to focus on the poetics of the Fasti rather than political themes. Murgatroyd's work has particularly focused on the cinematic style of Ovid's work, which he shows employs elaborate and often highly subtle devices to create a vivid picture within a confined narrative. Murgatroyd particularly looks at Ovid's relationships with other authors, notably Livy (from whom Ovid is at pains to distinguish his poetic rather than historical enterprise) and Virgil, and traces how Ovid uses their narratives to construct his own identity in relation to his predecessors in a spirit of friendly competition. He has also traced the progression of Ovid's narrator through the divine interviews from a seemingly naïve and somewhat overwhelmed poet to a full-fledged vates who ends up in command of the narrative process.
