= Salii =

Ancient Roman priestly order

The Salii, Salians, or Salian priests were the "leaping priests" of Mars in ancient Roman religion, supposed to have been introduced by King Numa Pompilius. They were twelve patrician youths dressed as archaic warriors with an embroidered tunic, a breastplate, a short red cloak (paludamentum), a sword, and a spiked headdress called an apex. They were charged with the twelve bronze shields called ancilia, which—like those of the Mycenaeans—resembled a figure eight. One of the shields was said to have fallen from heaven in the reign of King Numa and eleven copies were made to protect the identity of the sacred shield on the advice of the nymph Egeria, consort of Numa, who prophesied that wherever that shield was preserved, the people would be the dominant people of the earth.

Each year in March, the Salii made a procession round the city, dancing and singing the Carmen Saliare. Ovid, who relates the story of Numa and the heavenly ancilia in his Fasti, found the hymn and the Salian rituals outdated and hard to understand. During the Principate, by decree of the Senate, Augustus's name was inserted into the song. They ended the day by banqueting. "Table of the Salii" (Saliaris cena) became proverbial in Latin for a sumptuous feast. It is unclear whether the primary aim of the ritual was to protect Rome's army, although this is the traditional view.

King Tullus Hostilius is said to have established another collegium of Salii in fulfillment of a vow which he made in the second war with Fidenae and Veii. These Salii Collini were also twelve in number, chosen from the Patricians, and appeared to have been dedicated to the service of Quirinus.

The Salii are sometimes credited with the opening and closing of the war cycle which would last from March to October.

== Name ==
Saliī is the plural form of Salius, a noun and adjective that seem to derive from salīre ("to jump, to leap") and to be cognate with saltāre ("to dance, to jump"). They were sometimes known as the Palatine Salii (Salii Palatini) to distinguish them from the priests of Quirinius. They are also known in English as the Salians or the Salian Priests. The Salii Collini were also known as the Agonales or Agonenses.

== Origin ==
According to legend, Numa Pompilius established the Salii Palatini, which honored the god Mars, while Tullus Hostilius established the Salii Collini which honored the god Quirinus.

An origin among the Etruscans is attributed to a founding by Morrius, king of Veii. The Salii are also given an origin in connection with Dardanus and the Samothracian Di Penates, and the Salius who came to Italy with Evander and in the Aeneid competed in the funeral games of Anchises. Indeed in book VIII of The Aeneid, while in the land of King Evander Aeneas is entertained by the Salii during a feast, who are commemorating the fame and feasts of Hercules.

Ancient authors quoted by Maurus Servius Honoratus and Macrobius recorded that Salii had existed at Tibur, Tusculum and Veii even before their creation in Rome.

== Role ==
The twelve Salii used song and dance as part of religious ritual. They were state sponsored and considered important for the maintenance of the Roman social order. Their dances were also used to tell religious or historical stories. The Salii honored the gods Jupiter, Janus, and Mars. This dance was referred to as the tripudium. Horace describes the Salii performing this dance by stamping their feet three times. Their dance was also associated with leaping and jumping. Seneca the Younger wrote that it was a popular dance that required professional training to perform. It is possible that the term tripudium referred to a variety of dances. Alongside dancing, the Salii would sing songs known as the Carmen Saliare. Varro claimed that the Salian priests did not understand the meanings of the lyrics they sang. It is possible they contained older spellings and archaic words. Plutarch describes them chanting and dancing with a quick rhythm. He also wrote that they would beat daggers on shields to create music. These shields were known as ancilia. Other descriptions stated that used flutes to sing the songs. The Salii wore embroidered tunics under purple trabeae with bronze helmets and belts during their festivals. They also wore garlands of white ribbons, a conical cap known as an apex, and wheat sheaves. Some wore togae praetextae around their waists. Their rituals took place in March, during the Spring equinox. If a Salius was elected consul, flamen, pontifex, or augur, they would resign from their position in the Salii.

== Salian virgins ==
Sextus Pompeius Festus makes a perplexing reference to "Salian virgins" (Saliae virgines). Wearing the paludamentum and pointed apex of the Salii, these women were employed to assist the College of Pontiffs in carrying out sacrifices in the Regia. It has been suggested that the passage in Festus describes a transvestite initiation. An earlier explanation held that the maidens played the role of absent warriors in some form of propitiation. The possibility of their being "hired" is disputed, as is their status, but the use of virgines implies that they were freeborn citizens.

== Interpretations of the rituals ==
There is no single overreaching description of the Salii's rituals throughout the month of March from any of the ancient authors, and facts have to be reconstructed from multiple mentions in diverse works; however, there are strong indications that the procession may actually have lasted a full 24 days, from March 1st which opened the festival until March 24th, which closed it, with the procession moving from one station to another each day, and with revels being held each evening; a complete assessment can be found in Smith, Wayte, & Marindin (1890).

Classical philologist Georg Wissowa maintained that the ritual of the Salii is a war dance or a sword dance, with their costumes clearly indicating their military origin. Georges Dumézil interpreted the rituals of the Salii as marking the opening and the closing of the yearly war season. The opening would coincide with the day of the Agonium Martiale on March 17, and the closing with the day of the Armilustrium on October 19. The first date was also referred to as ancilia movere, "to move the ancilia," and the second as ancilia condere, "to store (or hide) the ancilia." Dumezil views the two groups of Salii — one representing Mars and the other Quirinus — as a dialectic relationship, showing the interdependency of the military and economic functions in Roman society. Wissowa compares the Salii with the noble youth who dance the Lusus Troiae: thus, the ritual dance of the Salii would be a coalescence of an initiation into adulthood and war, with a scapegoat ritual (see also pharmakos). Other 19th-century scholars have compared the rituals of the Salii with the Vedic myths of Indra and the Maruts.

Because the earliest Roman calendar had begun with the month of March, Hermann Usener thought the ceremonies of the ancilia movere were a ritual expulsion of the old year, represented by the mysterious figure of Mamurius Veturius, to make way for the new god Mars, born on March 1. On the Ides of March, a man ritually named as Mamurius Veturius was beaten with long white sticks in the sacrum Mamurii; in Usener's view, this was a form of scapegoating. Mamurius was the mythic blacksmith who forged eleven replicas of the original divine shield that had dropped from the sky. According to Usener and Ludwig Preller, Mars would be a god of war and fertility while Mamurius Veturius would mean "Old Mars". Mars is himself a dancer, and the head of the Salian dancers, patrician young men whose parents were both living (patrimi and matrimi).

== Nomenclature ==
Ceremonial headgear of the Salii and flamens

- Numa's Salii Palatini were dedicated to Mars surnamed Gradivus (meaning "he who walks into battle"), and were quartered on the Palatine Hill.
- Tullus' Salii Collini were dedicated to Quirinus, and were quartered on the Quirinal Hill. Rosinus called them Agonenses Salii. The second group of Salii may in fact have been created during an Augustan reorganization of the priesthood. Paulus ex Festo p. 10 M reads: ... Agones dicebant montes, Agonia sacrificia quae fiebant in monte; hinc Romae mons Quirinalis Agonus et Collina Porta Agonensis: "Agones were called the mounts, Agonia the sacrifices that took place on the mounts; hence in Rome the Quirinal mount (is named) Agonus and the Porta Collina Agonensis".
