= Mars (mythology) =

Roman god of war, guardian of agriculture

- God of war, guardian of agriculture and the Roman people
- Member of the Archaic Triad and the Dii Consentes
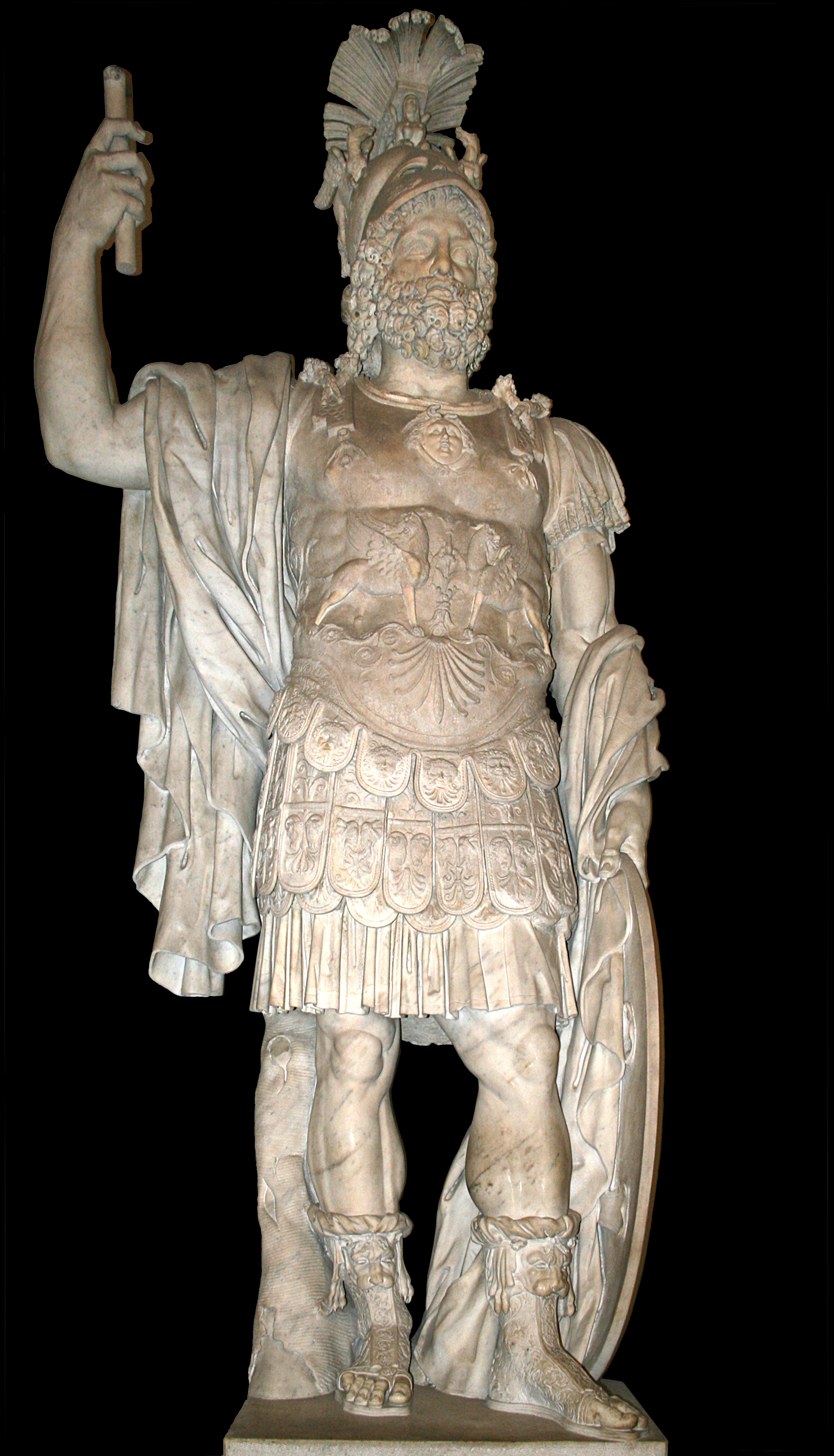
- Statue of Mars from the Forum of Nerva, 2nd century CE
- Other names: Mavors, Mavorte (archaic, poetic)
- Planet: Mars
- Symbols: spear, shield
- Day: Tuesday (dies Martis)
- Festivals: February 27, March 14 Equirria horse races March 1 Dies natalis (birthday) and feriae of the Salian priests March 17 Agonia; May 14 dies natalis, Temple of Mars Invictus; October 15 October Horse sacrifice October 19 Armilustrium

Genealogy
- Parents: Jupiter and Juno
- Siblings: Vulcan, Minerva, Hercules, Bellona, Apollo, Diana, Bacchus, etc.
- Consort: Nerio and others including Rhea Silvia, Venus, Bellona
- Children: Cupid, Romulus and Remus

Equivalents
- Etruscan: Maris, Laran
- Greek: Ares
- Norse: Tyr
- Egyptian: Onuris

In ancient Roman religion and mythology, Mars (Latin: Mārs, pronounced [maːrs]) is the god of war and also an agricultural guardian, a combination characteristic of early Rome. He is the son of Jupiter and Juno, and was pre-eminent among the Roman army's military gods. Most of his festivals were held in March, the month named for him (Latin Martius), and in October, the months which traditionally began and ended the season for both military campaigning and farming.

Under the influence of Greek culture, Mars was identified with the Greek god Ares, whose myths were reinterpreted in Roman literature and art under the name of Mars. The character and dignity of Mars differs in fundamental ways from that of his Greek counterpart, who is often treated with contempt and revulsion in Greek literature. Mars's altar in the Campus Martius, the area of Rome that took its name from him, was supposed to have been dedicated by Numa, the peace-loving semi-legendary second king of Rome; in Republican times it was a focus of electoral activities. Augustus shifted the focus of Mars's cult to within the pomerium (Rome's ritual boundary), and built a temple to Mars Ultor as a key religious feature of his new forum.

Unlike Ares, who was viewed primarily as a destructive and destabilizing force, Mars represented military power as a way to secure peace, and was a father (pater) of the Roman people. In Rome's mythic genealogy and founding, Mars fathered Romulus and Remus through his rape of Rhea Silvia. The wolf was the sacred animal of Mars, with the she-wolf nursing the two founders as children. His love affair with Venus symbolically reconciled two different traditions of Rome's founding; Venus was the divine mother of the hero Aeneas, credited by Vergil as an earlier founder of Rome.

== Name ==
The word Mārs (genitive Mārtis), which in Old Latin and poetic usage also appears as Māvors (Māvortis), is cognate with Oscan Māmers (Māmertos). In older literature, the god Mars was equated with the Vedic storm deities known as the Maruts, both of which were traditionally unified under a reconstructed Proto-Indo-European term *māwort-. However, this etymology is now rejected in more modern Indo-Europeanist scholarship. The oldest recorded Latin form, Mamart- is likely of foreign origin. It has been explained as deriving from Maris, the name of an Etruscan child-god, though this is not universally agreed upon. Scholars have varying views on whether the two gods are related, and if so how. Latin adjectives from the name of Mars are Mārtius and mārtiālis, meaning "of Mars" or "warlike" from which derive the English term "martial" (as in "martial arts" or "martial law") and personal names such as "Marcus", "Mark" and "Martin".

Mars may ultimately be a thematic reflex of the Proto-Indo-European god Perkwunos, having originally been a thunderer character.

== Birth ==
Like Ares who was the son of Zeus and Hera, Mars is usually considered to be the son of Jupiter and Juno. In Ovid's version of Mars's origin, he was the son of Juno alone. Jupiter had usurped the role of mother when he gave birth to Minerva directly from his forehead (or mind) without a female partner. Juno sought the advice of the goddess Flora on how in turn to produce a child without male intervention. Flora obtained a magic flower (Latin flos, plural flores, a masculine word) and tested it on a heifer who became fecund at once. Flora ritually plucked a flower, using her thumb, touched Juno's belly, and impregnated her. Juno withdrew to Thrace and the shore of Marmara for the birth.

Ovid tells this story in the Fasti, his long-form poetic work on the Roman calendar. It may explain why the Matronalia, a festival celebrated by married women in honor of Juno as a goddess of childbirth, occurred on the first day of Mars's month, which is also marked on a calendar from late antiquity as the birthday of Mars. In the earliest Roman calendar, March was the first month, and the god would have been born with the new year. Ovid is the only source for the story. He may be presenting a literary myth of his own invention, or an otherwise unknown archaic Italic tradition; either way, in choosing to include the story, he emphasizes that Mars was connected to plant life and was not alienated from female nurture.

== Consort ==
The consort of Mars was Nerio or Neriene, meaning "Valor". She represents the vital force (vis), power (potentia) and majesty (maiestas) of Mars. Her name was regarded as Sabine in origin and is equivalent to Latin virtus, "manly virtue" (from vir, "man"). In the early 3rd century BCE, the comic playwright Plautus has a reference to Mars greeting Nerio, his wife. A source from late antiquity says that Mars and Neriene were celebrated together at a festival held on March 23. In the later Roman Empire, Neriene came to be identified with Minerva.

Nerio probably originates as a divine personification of Mars's power, as such abstractions in Latin are generally feminine. Her name appears with that of Mars in an archaic prayer invoking a series of abstract qualities, each paired with the name of a deity. The influence of Greek mythology and its anthropomorphic gods may have caused Roman writers to treat these pairs as "marriages."

=== Venus and Mars ===
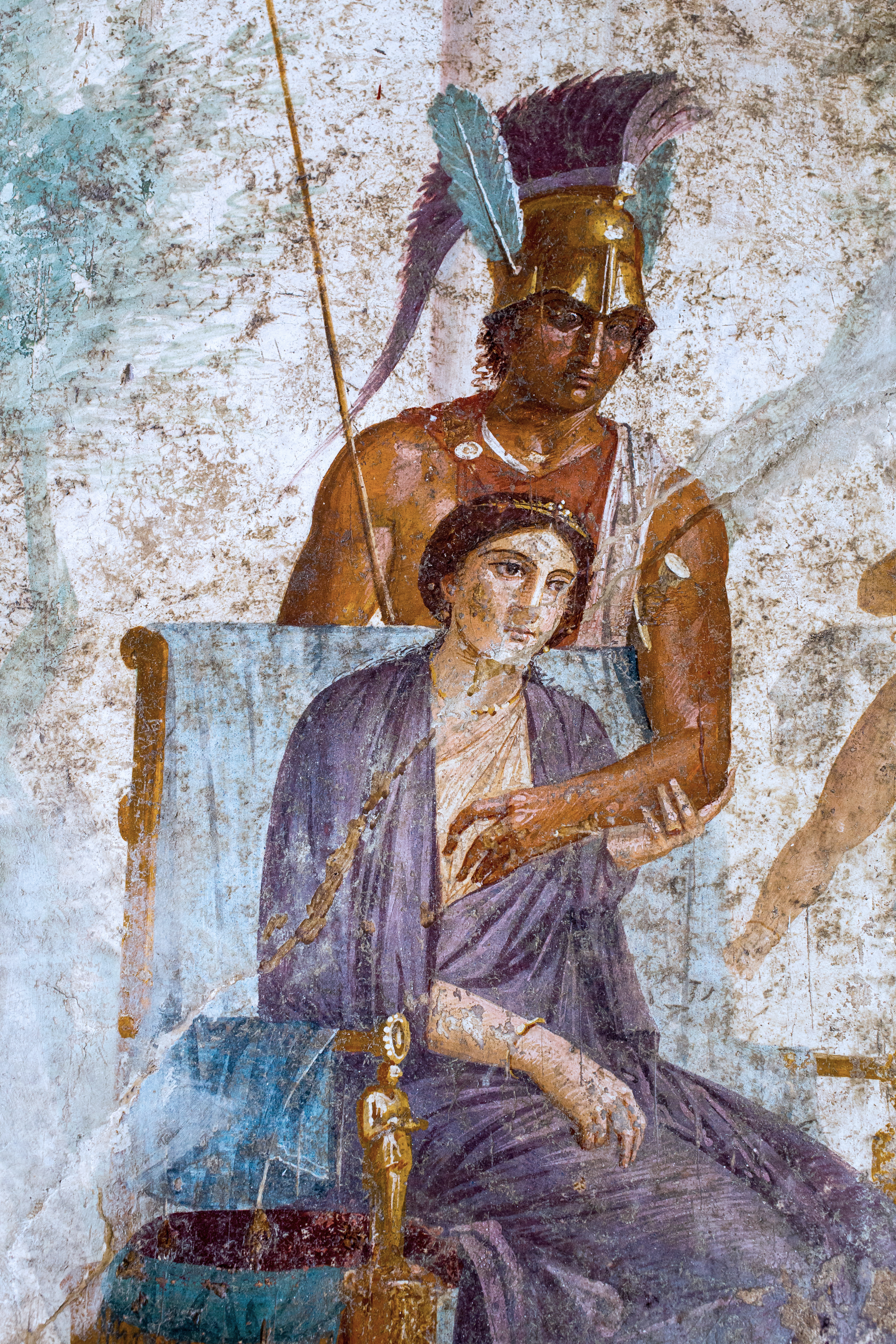
Mars caresses Venus enthroned. Wall-painting in Pompeii, c. 20 BC – 50s AD.

The union of Venus and Mars held greater appeal for poets and philosophers, and the couple were a frequent subject of art. In Greek myth, the adultery of Ares and Aphrodite had been exposed to ridicule when her husband Hephaestus (whose Roman equivalent was Vulcan) caught them in the act by means of a magical snare. Although not originally part of the Roman tradition, in 217 BCE Venus and Mars were presented as a complementary pair in the lectisternium, a public banquet at which images of twelve major gods of the Roman state were presented on couches as if present and participating.

Scenes of Venus and Mars in Roman art often ignore the adulterous implications of their union, and take pleasure in the good-looking couple attended by Cupid or multiple Loves (amores). Some scenes may imply marriage, and the relationship was romanticized in funerary or domestic art in which husbands and wives had themselves portrayed as the passionate divine couple. The uniting of deities representing Love and War lent itself to allegory, especially since the lovers were the parents of Concordia. The Renaissance philosopher Marsilio Ficino notes that "only Venus dominates Mars, and he never dominates her". In ancient Roman and Renaissance art, Mars is often shown disarmed and relaxed, or even sleeping, but the extramarital nature of their affair can also suggest that this peace is impermanent.

== Essential nature ==
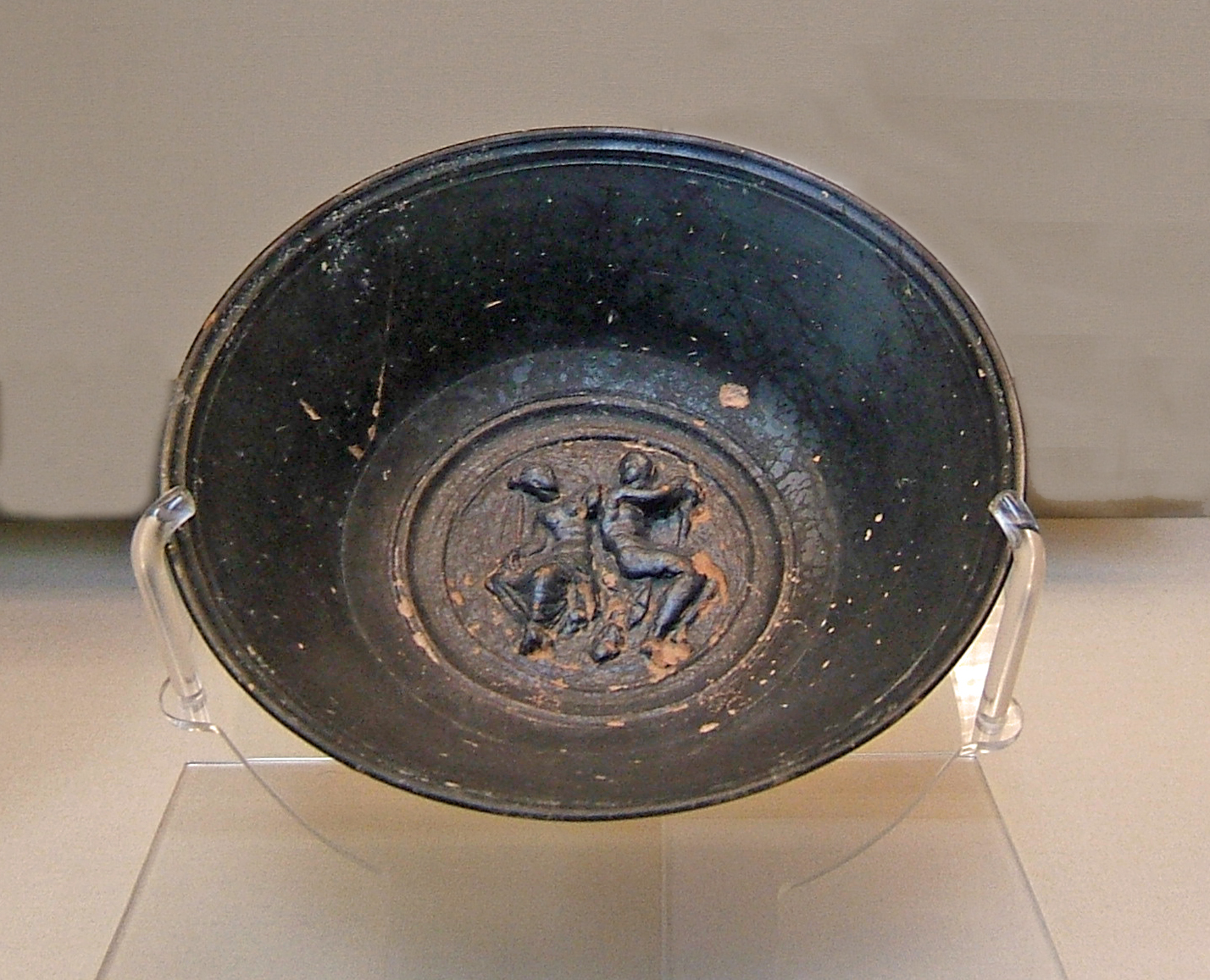
A relief depicting Mars and Venus on a black-slip bowl from Campania, Italy, 250–150 BCE, British Museum

=== War ===
Virility as a kind of life force (vis) or virtue (virtus) is an essential characteristic of Mars. During the Middle Republican period, the consul Marcus Claudius Marcellus vowed to construct a temple to Honos and Virtus, though it was only completed posthumously by his son, who also left an inscription commemorating the god Mars. In the earliest Roman writings, the term "virtus" applied to battlefield courage: Artotrogus, a character in the play The Braggart Soldier by the 3rd-century BCE author Plautus, addresses the boastful soldier Pyrgopolynices, stating "Mars wouldn’t dare to call himself such a warrior or compare his exploits to yours" ("tam bellatorem Mars haud ausit dicere neque aequiperare suas uirtutes ad tuas"). Furthermore, during the prologue to the Plautine play Casina, the speaker exclaims "be victorious through true bravery" ("vincite virtute vera"). Later in Roman history, the concept of "virtus" expanded to incorporate the idea of wisdom, possibly due to the influence of the Greek association between military prowess and intelligence, a Hellenic cultural concept embodied by the deity Athena. The transformation of the idea of "virtus" itself altered the underlying character of Mars, who developed into a god of generalship alongside warrior skill. According to the classicist John Serrati, Mars—as the personification of virtus—exemplified ideal Roman masculinity. By the 3rd-century CE, Mars was primarily worshipped by Roman military legions.

Various festivals associated with Mars, such as the Tubilustrium and Armilustrium, were themselves connected with lustration, a type of Roman religious practice intended to ward off evil. The lustral connotations of Mars may imply that he fulfilled a type of protector or guardian in Roman mythology. The conceptualization of Mars as a protector deity may have facilitated his associations with war. According to the 4th-century author Servius the Grammarian, during wartime, a spear was shaken in the Regia and Mars was called upon to watch over the Roman people with the words "Mars vigila." As a war god, Mars was associated a series of festivals occurring around March at the beginning of the Roman campaigning season, such a ritualistic dance of the Salian priests, and ceremonies belonging to the month of October, such as the October Horse or the Armilustrium, all of which were connected with the end of the campaign season. Chronologically, the rituals associated with the beginning and end of the campaigning season were also concurrent with the ideal time frame for agriculture, which perhaps relates to the dual characterization of Mars as a rustic and warlike divinity. However, by the 2nd and 3rd centuries CE, Roman soldiers no longer departed for campaign during particular months of the year but instead remained permanently stationed at various forts and military installations throughout the empire. Consequently, the original connection between the military and farming season became irrelevant.

=== Agriculture ===
As an agricultural guardian, Mars directs his energies toward creating conditions that allow crops to grow, which may include warding off hostile forces of nature. The agricultural role of Mars may be inseparable from his warrior nature, as the leaping of his armed priests the Salii was meant to expedite the growth of crops. Within the Carmen Arvale, an archaic Latin text, the god Mars is invoked by the Arval Brotherhood specifically to protect and defend the suppliants from ill. This same order of priests is otherwise associated with ensuring high agricultural output through the performance of religious rituals. Cato similarly describes a lustratio in which Mars is invoked to guard the suppliant and their crops from a variety of misfortunes, such as poor weather. These actions are ultimately conducive to a successful harvest, though they are not necessarily incongruent with his characterization as a type of protector god. Later in Roman history, the goddess Ceres became more closely associated with the lustration ritual and agriculture, whereas—perhaps due to the influence of the Greek deity Ares—the role of Mars as a war god assumed greater prominence.

The classicist Andrew Kilgour argues that it is perhaps befitting for a male deity in Roman culture to assume a more intrinsically belligerent role within the sphere of agriculture, whereas the responsibility of facilitating the growth of crops falls upon goddesses such as Dea Dia. However, the archaeologist Robert Turcan suggests the Mars may embody a productive role within the prayer and therefore may exemplify the supposed three primary functions of Proto-Indo-European society: Religious, Martial, and Productive. The bellicose aspect of Mars is possibly reflected by his ability to fend off disaster, yet still the text actively calls upon the deity to ensure a more abundant harvest, perhaps attesting to productive responsibilities. The possible connection between Mars and the priestly or religious aspect of Proto-Indo-European culture may be continued by the ceremony of the October Horse, a ritualistic animal sacrifice that is perhaps related to the Vedic aśvamedha ritual. In other Indo-European mythologies, war gods may simultaneously serve as agrarian deities, such as the Slavic god Svetovit.

=== Rustic god ===
Mars may have originated as a god of the wild, who dwelt beyond the boundaries set by humans. Mars's potential for savagery is expressed in his obscure connections to the wild woodlands. In his book on farming, Cato the Elder invokes Mars Silvanus for a ritual to be carried out in silva, in the woods, an uncultivated place that if not held within bounds can threaten to overtake the fields needed for crops. In the surviving text of their hymn, the Arval Brothers invoked Mars as ferus, "savage" or "feral" like a wild animal. The historian William Warde Fowler further notes that, mythologically, Mars was associated with the woodpecker and the wolf, two wild animals, the latter of which was particularly common in ancient Italy. The priesthood of the Arval Brothers called on Mars to drive off "rust" (lues), with its double meaning of wheat fungus and the red oxides that affect metal, a threat to both iron farm implements and weaponry. For much of early Roman history, Mars largely lacked intramural temples, with much of his worship occurring outside urban areas. However, despite his general confinement to extra-urban spaces, a ceremony propitiating Mars was performed within the city of Rome itself—the aforementioned ritual of the Salian priests in which Mars was called upon to watch over Rome during wartime.

During the reign of Augustus (r. 27 BCE – 14 CE), the emperor constructed a statue of Mars Ultor in the Augustan Forum near temples to Venus and Divus Iulius, thereby violating the apparent prior aversion to urban sanctuaries honoring the divinity. Within the mythological origin of Rome outlined by the 1st-century BCE poet Virgil, Mars was cast as the ancestor of Romulus and Venus as the ancestor of Aeneas, both of whom were—in the account of Virgil—responsible for the eventual founding of Rome. Moreover, Venus was in legend associated with the Julii family, to which Augustus belonged. Thus, by emphasizing the relationship between Venus and Mars, emperor Augustus may have sought to reframe Mars as the progenitor of the Roman people and patron of the Imperial dynasty.

== Sacred animals ==
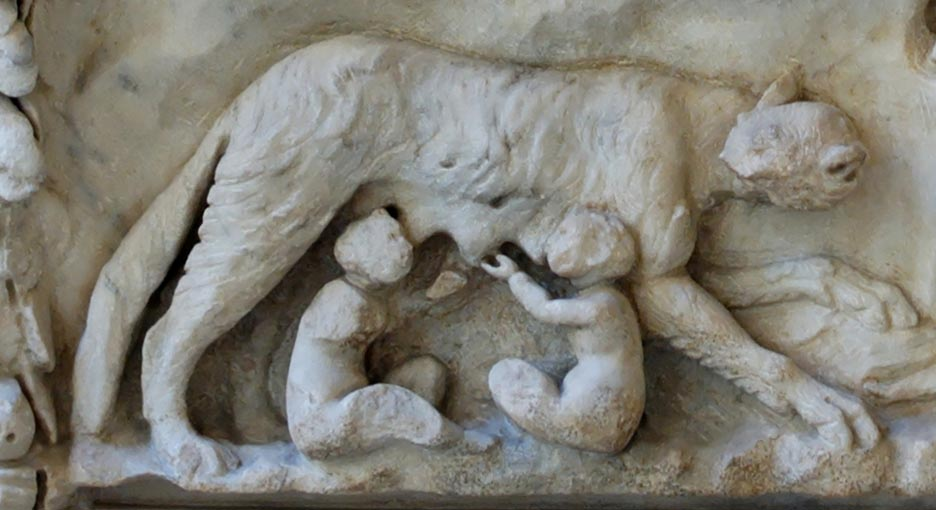
She-wolf and twins Romulus and Remus from an altar to Venus and Mars

The wild animals most sacred to Mars were the woodpecker and the wolf, which in the natural lore of the Romans were said always to inhabit the same foothills and woodlands.

Plutarch notes that the woodpecker (picus) is sacred to Mars because "it is a courageous and spirited bird and has a beak so strong that it can overturn oaks by pecking them until it has reached the inmost part of the tree." As the beak of the picus Martius contained the god's power to ward off harm, it was carried as a magic charm to prevent bee stings and leech bites. The bird of Mars also guarded a woodland herb (paeonia) used for treatment of the digestive or female reproductive systems; those who sought to harvest it were advised to do so by night, lest the woodpecker jab out their eyes. The picus Martius seems to have been a particular species, but authorities differ on which one: perhaps Picus viridis or Dryocopus martius.

The woodpecker was revered by the Latin peoples, who abstained from eating its flesh. It was one of the most important birds in Roman and Italic augury, the practice of reading the will of the gods through watching the sky for signs. The mythological figure named Picus had powers of augury that he retained when he was transformed into a woodpecker; in one tradition, Picus was the son of Mars. The Umbrian cognate peiqu also means "woodpecker", and the Italic Picenes were supposed to have derived their name from the picus who served as their guide animal during a ritual migration (ver sacrum) undertaken as a rite of Mars. In the territory of the Aequi, another Italic people, Mars had an oracle of great antiquity where the prophecies were supposed to be spoken by a woodpecker perched on a wooden column.

Mars's association with the wolf is familiar from what may be the most famous of Roman myths, the story of how a she-wolf (lupa) suckled his infant sons when they were exposed by order of King Amulius, who feared them because he had usurped the throne from their grandfather, Numitor. The woodpecker also brought nourishment to the twins.

The wolf appears elsewhere in Roman art and literature in masculine form as the animal of Mars. A statue group that stood along the Appian Way showed Mars in the company of wolves. At the Battle of Sentinum in 295 BCE, the appearance of the wolf of Mars (Martius lupus) was a sign that Roman victory was to come.

In Roman Gaul, the goose was associated with the Celtic forms of Mars, and archaeologists have found geese buried alongside warriors in graves. The goose was considered a bellicose animal because it is easily provoked to aggression.

=== Sacrificial animals ===
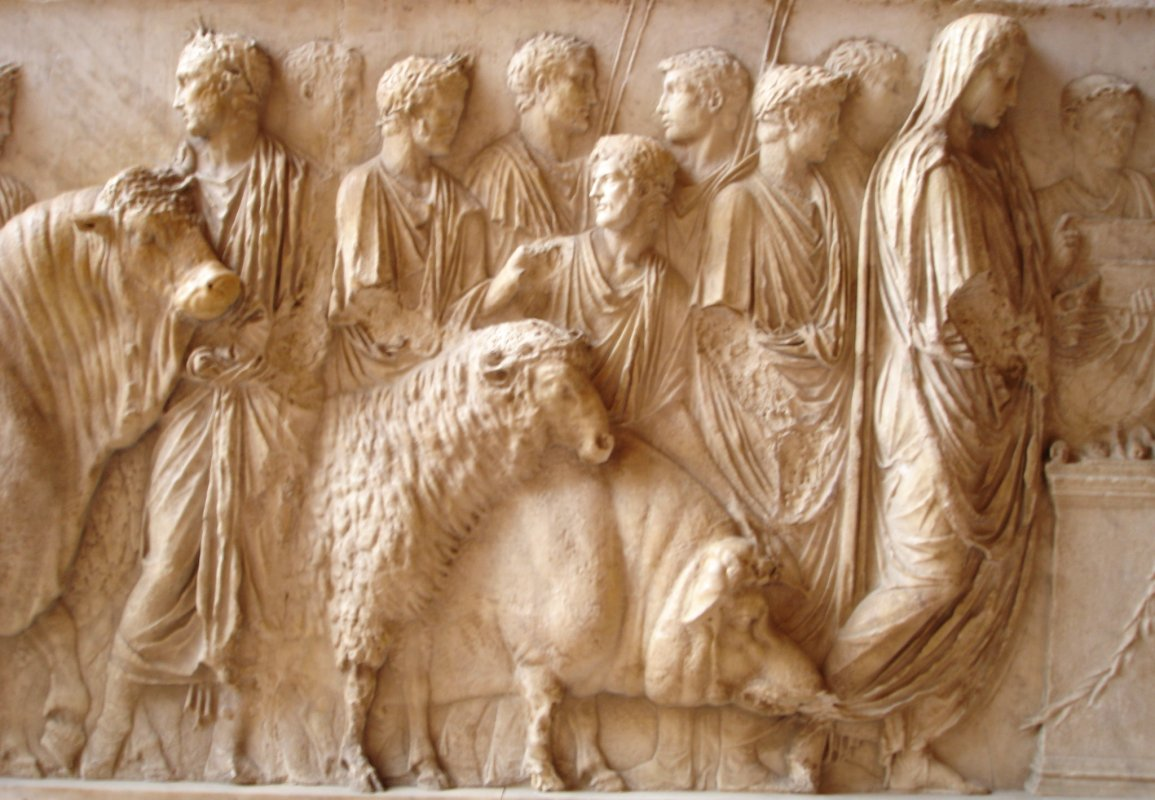
The procession of the suovetaurilia, a sacrifice of a pig, ram, and bull, led by a priest with his head ritually covered

Ancient Greek and Roman religion distinguished between animals that were sacred to a deity and those that were prescribed as the correct sacrificial offerings for the god. Wild animals might be viewed as already belonging to the god to whom they were sacred, or at least not owned by human beings and therefore not theirs to give. Since sacrificial meat was eaten at a banquet after the gods received their portion – mainly the entrails (exta) – it follows that the animals sacrificed were most often, though not always, domestic animals normally part of the Roman diet. Gods often received castrated male animals as sacrifices, and the goddesses female victims; Mars, however, regularly received intact males. Mars did receive oxen under a few of his cult titles, such as Mars Grabovius, but the usual offering was the bull, singly, in multiples, or in combination with other animals.

The two most distinctive animal sacrifices made to Mars were the suovetaurilia, a triple offering of a pig (sus), ram (ovis) and bull (taurus), and the October Horse, the only horse sacrifice known to have been carried out in ancient Rome and a rare instance of a victim the Romans considered inedible.

== Temples and topography in Rome ==
The earliest center in Rome for cultivating Mars as a deity was the Altar of Mars (Ara Martis) in the Campus Martius ("Field of Mars") outside the sacred boundary of Rome (pomerium). The Romans thought that this altar had been established by the semi-legendary Numa Pompilius, the peace-loving successor of Romulus. According to Roman tradition, the Campus Martius had been consecrated to Mars by their ancestors to serve as horse pasturage and an equestrian training ground for youths. During the Roman Republic (509–27 BCE), the Campus was a largely open expanse. No temple was built at the altar, but from 193 BCE a covered walkway connected it to the Porta Fontinalis, near the office and archives of the Roman censors. Newly elected censors placed their curule chairs by the altar, and when they had finished conducting the census, the citizens were collectively purified with a suovetaurilia there. A frieze from the so-called "Altar" of Domitius Ahenobarbus is thought to depict the census, and may show Mars himself standing by the altar as the procession of victims advances.

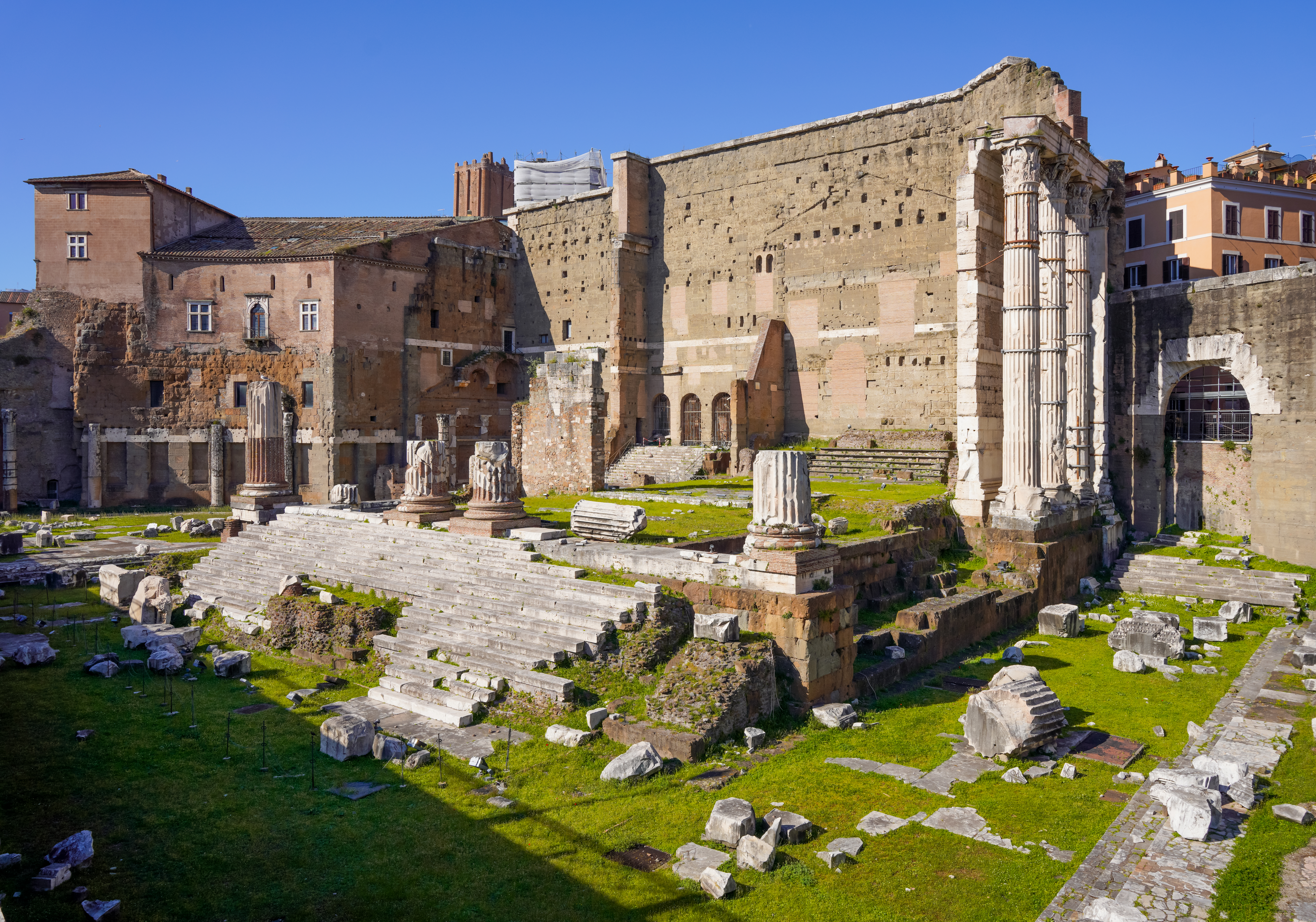
Remains of the Temple of Mars Ultor in the Forum of Augustus, Rome

The main Temple of Mars (Aedes Martis) in the Republican period also lay outside the sacred boundary and was devoted to the god's warrior aspect. It was built to fulfill a vow (votum) made by a Titus Quinctius in 388 BCE during the Gallic siege of Rome. The founding day (dies natalis) was commemorated on June 1, and the temple is attested by several inscriptions and literary sources. The sculpture group of Mars and the wolves was displayed there. Soldiers sometimes assembled at the temple before heading off to war, and it was the point of departure for a major parade of Roman cavalry held annually on July 15.

A temple to Mars in the Circus Flaminius was built around 133 BCE, funded by Decimus Junius Brutus Callaicus from war booty. It housed a colossal statue of Mars and a nude Venus.

The Campus Martius continued to provide venues for equestrian events such as chariot racing during the Imperial period, but under the first emperor Augustus it underwent a major program of urban renewal, marked by monumental architecture. The Altar of Augustan Peace (Ara Pacis Augustae) was located there, as was the Obelisk of Montecitorio, imported from Egypt to form the pointer (gnomon) of the Solarium Augusti, a giant sundial. With its public gardens, the Campus became one of the most attractive places in the city to visit.

Augustus made the centrepiece of his new forum a large Temple to Mars Ultor, a manifestation of Mars he cultivated as the avenger (ultor) of the murder of Julius Caesar and of the military disaster suffered at the Battle of Carrhae. When the legionary standards lost to the Parthians were recovered, they were housed in the new temple. The date of the temple's dedication on May 12 was aligned with the heliacal setting of the constellation Scorpio, the sign of war. The date continued to be marked with circus games as late as the mid-4th century AD.

A large statue of Mars was part of the short-lived Arch of Nero, which was built in 62 CE but dismantled after Nero's suicide and disgrace (damnatio memoriae).

== Iconography and symbol ==
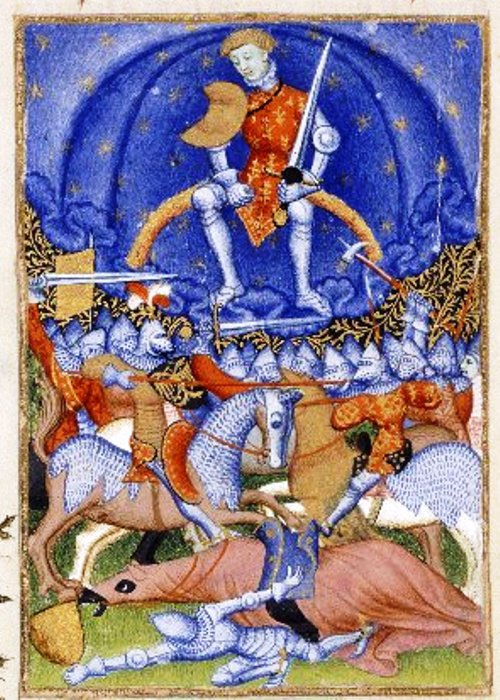
Medieval representation of Mars. Sitting on a rainbow with a sword and a sceptre, he "excites men to war".

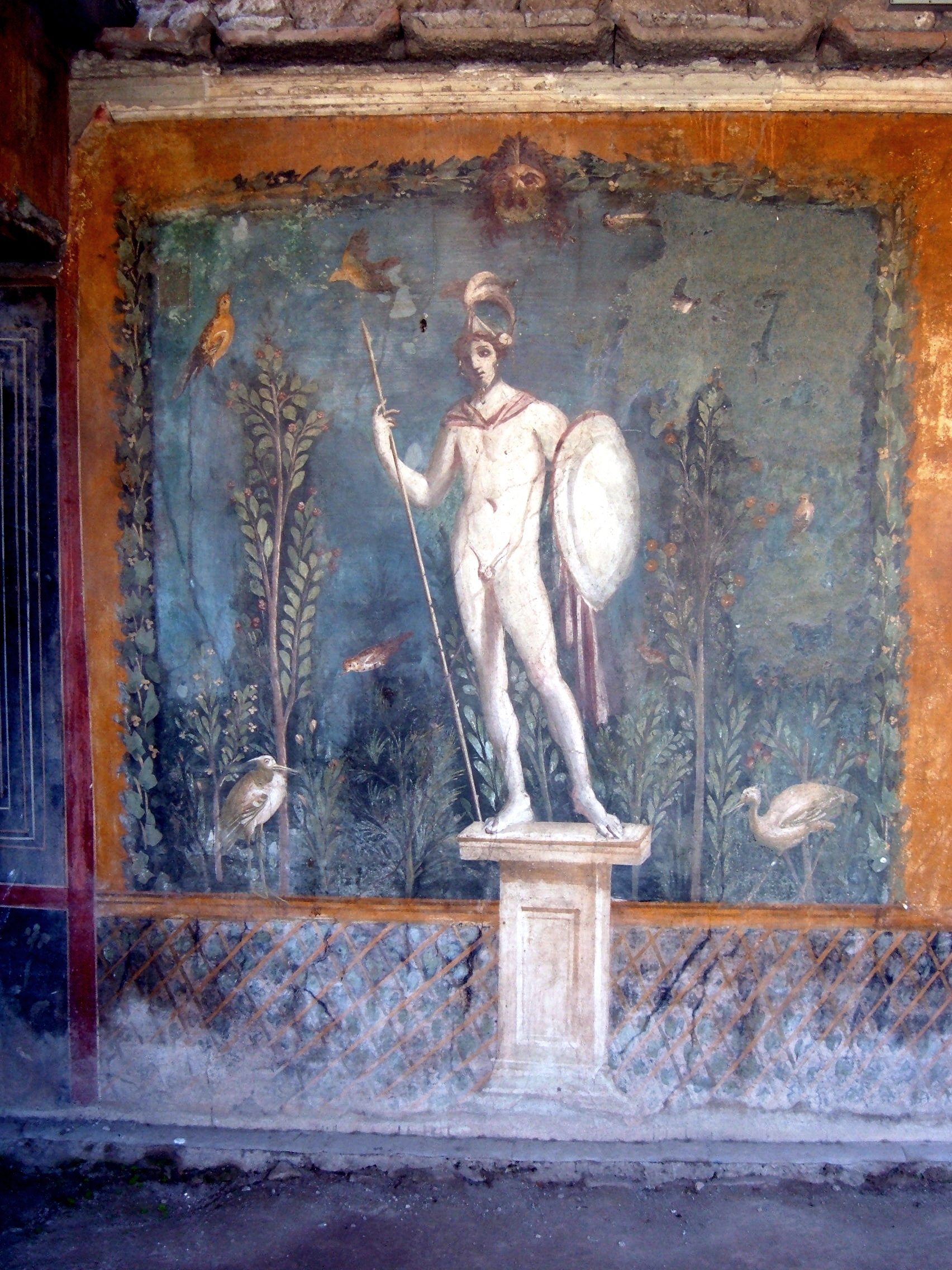
A nude statue of Mars in a garden setting, depicted on a wall painting from Pompeii

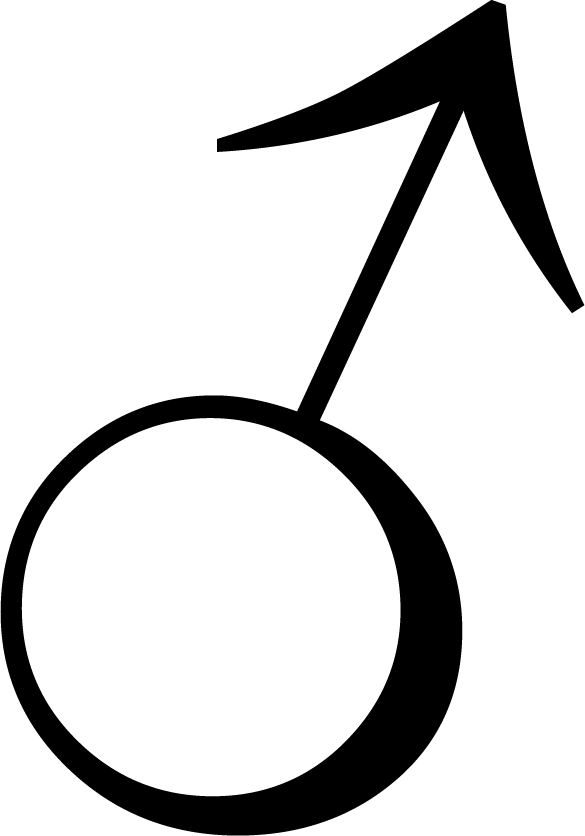
A stylised "spear and shield of Mars" is also the symbol for the planet Mars and male gender.

In Roman art, Mars is depicted as either bearded and mature, or young and clean-shaven. Even nude or seminude, he often wears a helmet or carries a spear as emblems of his warrior nature. Mars was among the deities to appear on the earliest Roman coinage in the late 4th and early 3rd century BCE. Statuettes of warrior figures, who perhaps represent Mars, are common throughout archaic Umbrian sanctuaries dating from the 6th–4th centuries BCE.

On the Altar of Peace (Ara Pacis), built in the last years of the 1st century BCE, Mars is a mature man with a "handsome, classicizing" face, and a short curly beard and moustache. His helmet is a plumed neo-Attic-type. He wears a military cloak (paludamentum) and a cuirass ornamented with a gorgoneion. Although the relief is somewhat damaged at this spot, he appears to hold a spear garlanded in laurel, symbolizing a peace that is won by military victory. The 1st-century statue of Mars found in the Forum of Nerva (pictured at top) is similar. In this guise, Mars is presented as the dignified ancestor of the Roman people. The panel of the Ara Pacis on which he appears would have faced the Campus Martius, reminding viewers that Mars was the god whose altar Numa established there, that is, the god of Rome's oldest civic and military institutions.

Particularly in works of art influenced by the Greek tradition, Mars may be portrayed in a manner that resembles Ares, youthful, beardless, and often nude. In the Renaissance, Mars's nudity was thought to represent his lack of fear in facing danger.

=== The spear of Mars ===
The spear is the instrument of Mars in the same way that Jupiter wields the lightning bolt, Neptune the trident, and Saturn the scythe or sickle. A relic or fetish called the spear of Mars was kept in a sacrarium at the Regia, the former residence of the Kings of Rome. The spear was said to move, tremble or vibrate at impending war or other danger to the state, as was reported to occur before the assassination of Julius Caesar. When Mars is pictured as a peace-bringer, his spear is wreathed with laurel or other vegetation, as on the Ara Pacis or a coin of Aemilianus.

== Priesthoods ==
The high priest of Mars in Roman public religion was the Flamen Martialis, who was one of the three major priests in the fifteen-member college of flamens. Mars was also served by the Salii, a twelve-member priesthood of patrician youths who dressed as archaic warriors and danced in procession around the city in March. Both priesthoods extend to the earliest periods of Roman history, and patrician birth was required.

== Festivals and rituals ==
The festivals of Mars cluster in his namesake month of March (Latin: Martius), with a few observances in October, the beginning and end of the season for military campaigning and agriculture. Festivals with horse racing took place in the Campus Martius. Some festivals in March retained characteristics of new year festivals, since Martius was originally the first month of the Roman calendar.

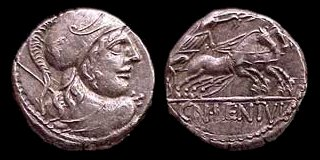
Denarius, issued 88 BCE, depicting the helmeted head of Mars, with Victory driving a two-horse chariot (biga) on the reverse

- February 27: Equirria, involving chariot or horse races;
- March 1: Mars's dies natalis ("birthday"), a feria also sacred to his mother Juno;
- March 14: a second Equirria, again with chariot races;
- March 14 or 15: Mamuralia, a new year festival when a figure called Mamurius Veturius (perhaps the "old Mars" of the old year) is driven out;
- March 17: an Agonalia or Agonium Martiale, an obscure type of observance held at other times for various deities;
- March 23: Tubilustrium, a purification of the deploying army March 23;
- October 15: the ritual of the October Horse, with a chariot race and Rome's only known horse sacrifice;
- October 19: Armilustrium ("purification of arms").

Mars was also honored by chariot races at the Robigalia and Consualia, though these festivals are not primarily dedicated to him. From 217 BCE onward, Mars was among the gods honored at the lectisternium, a banquet given for deities who were present as images.

Roman hymns (carmina) are rarely preserved, but Mars is invoked in two. The Arval Brothers, or "Brothers of the Fields", chanted a hymn to Mars while performing their three-step dance. The Carmen Saliare was sung by Mars's priests the Salii while they moved twelve sacred shields (ancilia) throughout the city in a procession. In the 1st century AD, Quintilian remarks that the language of the Salian hymn was so archaic that it was no longer fully understood.

== Name and cult epithets ==
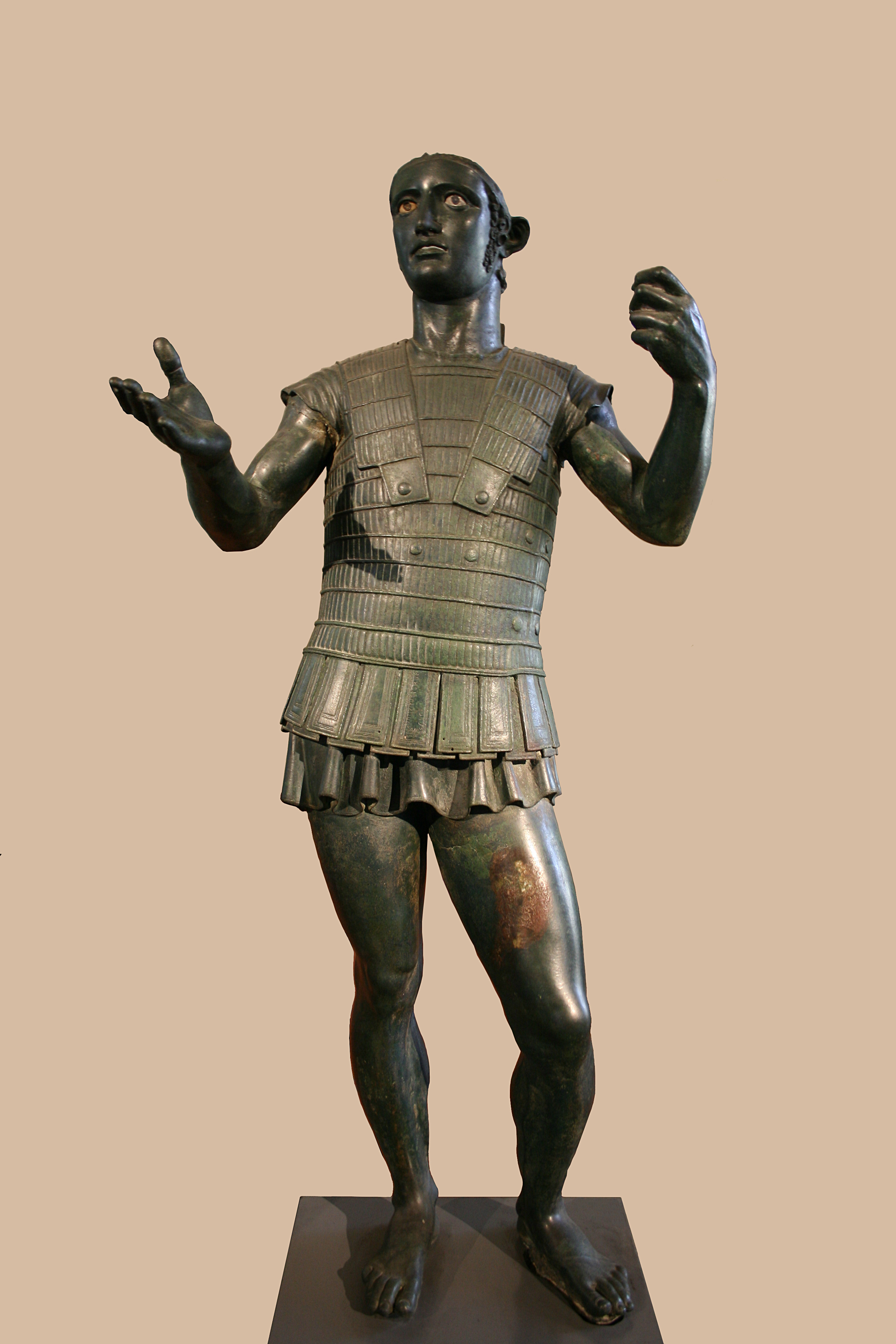
The so-called Mars of Todi, an Etruscan bronze of the early 4th century BCE, probably depicting a warrior.

In Classical Roman religion, Mars was invoked under several titles, and the first Roman emperor Augustus thoroughly integrated Mars into Imperial cult. The 4th-century Latin historian Ammianus Marcellinus treats Mars as one of several classical Roman deities who remained "cultic realities" up to his own time. Mars, and specifically Mars Ultor, was among the gods who received sacrifices from Julian, the only emperor to reject Christianity after the conversion of Constantine I. In 363 AD, in preparation for the Siege of Ctesiphon, Julian sacrificed ten "very fine" bulls to Mars Ultor. The tenth bull violated ritual protocol by attempting to break free, and when killed and examined, produced ill omens, among the many that were read at the end of Julian's reign. As represented by Ammianus, Julian swore never to make sacrifice to Mars again—a vow kept with his death a month later.

=== Mars Gradivus ===
Gradivus was one of the gods by whom a general or soldiers might swear an oath to be valorous in battle. His temple outside the Porta Capena was where armies gathered. The archaic priesthood of Mars Gradivus was the Salii, the "leaping priests" who danced ritually in armor as a prelude to war. His cult title is most often taken to mean "the Strider" or "the Marching God", from gradus, "step, march."

The poet Statius addresses him as "the most implacable of the gods," but Valerius Maximus concludes his history by invoking Mars Gradivus as "author and support of the name 'Roman'": Gradivus is asked – along with Capitoline Jupiter and Vesta, as the keeper of Rome's perpetual flame – to "guard, preserve, and protect" the state of Rome, the peace, and the princeps (the emperor Tiberius at the time).

A source from Late Antiquity says that the wife of Gradivus was Nereia, the daughter of Nereus, and that he loved her passionately.

=== Mars Quirinus ===
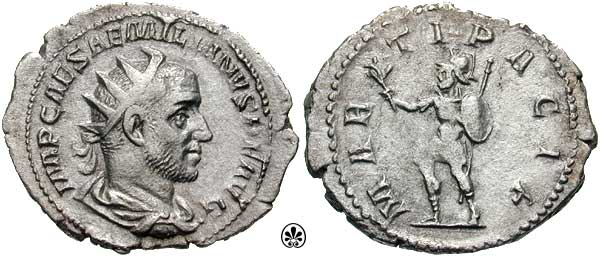
Mars celebrated as peace-bringer on a Roman coin issued by Aemilianus

Mars Quirinus was the protector of the Quirites ("citizens" or "civilians") as divided into curiae (citizen assemblies), whose oaths were required to make a treaty. As a guarantor of treaties, Mars Quirinus is thus a god of peace: "When he rampages, Mars is called Gradivus, but when he's at peace Quirinus."

The deified Romulus was identified with Mars Quirinus. In the Capitoline Triad of Jupiter, Mars, and Quirinus, however, Mars and Quirinus were two separate deities, though not perhaps in origin. Each of the three had his own flamen (specialized priest), but the functions of the Flamen Martialis and Flamen Quirinalis are hard to distinguish.

=== Mars Grabovius ===
Mars is invoked as Grabovius in the Iguvine Tablets, bronze tablets written in Umbrian that record ritual protocols for carrying out public ceremonies on behalf of the city and community of Iguvium. The same title is given to Jupiter and to the Umbrian deity Vofionus. This triad has been compared to the Archaic Triad, with Vofionus equivalent to Quirinus. Tables I and VI describe a complex ritual that took place at the three gates of the city. After the auspices were taken, two groups of three victims were sacrificed at each gate. Mars Grabovius received three oxen.

=== Mars Pater ===
"Father Mars" or "Mars the Father" is the form in which the god is invoked in the agricultural prayer of Cato, and he appears with this title in several other literary texts and inscriptions. Mars Pater is among the several gods invoked in the ritual of devotio, by means of which a general sacrificed himself and the lives of the enemy to secure a Roman victory.

Father Mars is the regular recipient of the suovetaurilia, the sacrifice of a pig (sus), ram (ovis) and bull (taurus), or often a bull alone. To Mars Pater other epithets were sometimes appended, such as Mars Pater Victor ("Father Mars the Victorious"), to whom the Roman army sacrificed a bull on March 1.

Although pater and mater were fairly common as honorifics for a deity, any special claim for Mars as father of the Roman people lies in the mythic genealogy that makes him the divine father of Romulus and Remus.

=== Mars Silvanus ===
In the section of his farming book that offers recipes and medical preparations, Cato describes a votum to promote the health of cattle:

Make an offering to Mars Silvanus in the forest (in silva) during the daytime for each head of cattle: 3 pounds of meal, 4½ pounds of bacon, 4½ pounds of meat, and 3 pints of wine. You may place the viands in one vessel, and the wine likewise in one vessel. Either a slave or a free man may make this offering. After the ceremony is over, consume the offering on the spot at once. A woman may not take part in this offering or see how it is performed. You may vow the vow every year if you wish.

That Mars Silvanus is a single entity has been doubted. Invocations of deities are often list-like, without connecting words, and the phrase should perhaps be understood as "Mars and Silvanus". Women were explicitly excluded from some cult practices of Silvanus, but not necessarily of Mars. William Warde Fowler, however, thought that the wild god of the wood Silvanus may have been "an emanation or offshoot" of Mars.

=== Mars Ultor ===
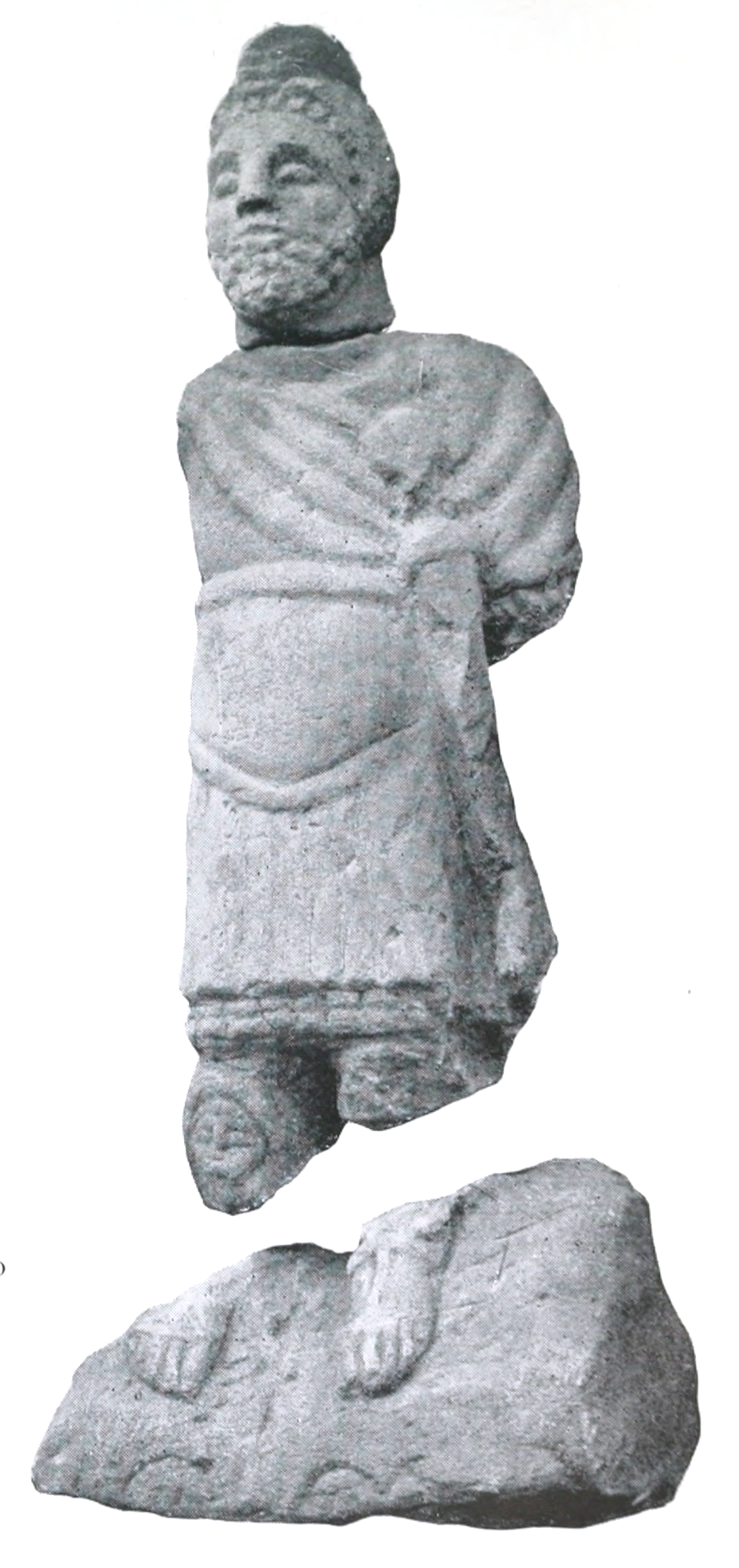
A statue to Mars Ultor from Balmuildy on the Antonine Wall: a reconstructed version can be viewed in a three-dimensional video

Augustus created the cult of "Mars the Avenger" to mark two occasions: his defeat of the assassins of Caesar at Philippi in 42 BCE, and the negotiated return of the Roman battle standards that had been lost to the Parthians at the Battle of Carrhae in 53 BCE. The god is depicted wearing a cuirass and helmet and standing in a "martial pose," leaning on a lance he holds in his right hand. He holds a shield in his left hand. The goddess Ultio, a divine personification of vengeance, had an altar and golden statue in his temple.

The Temple of Mars Ultor, dedicated in 2 BCE in the center of the Forum of Augustus, gave the god a new place of honor. Some rituals previously conducted within the cult of Capitoline Jupiter were transferred to the new temple, which became the point of departure for magistrates as they left for military campaigns abroad. Augustus required the Senate to meet at the temple when deliberating questions of war and peace. The temple also became the site at which sacrifice was made to conclude the rite of passage of young men assuming the toga virilis ("man's toga") around age 14.

On various Imperial holidays, Mars Ultor was the first god to receive a sacrifice, followed by the Genius of the emperor. An inscription from the 2nd century records a vow to offer Mars Ultor a bull with gilded horns.

=== Mars Augustus ===
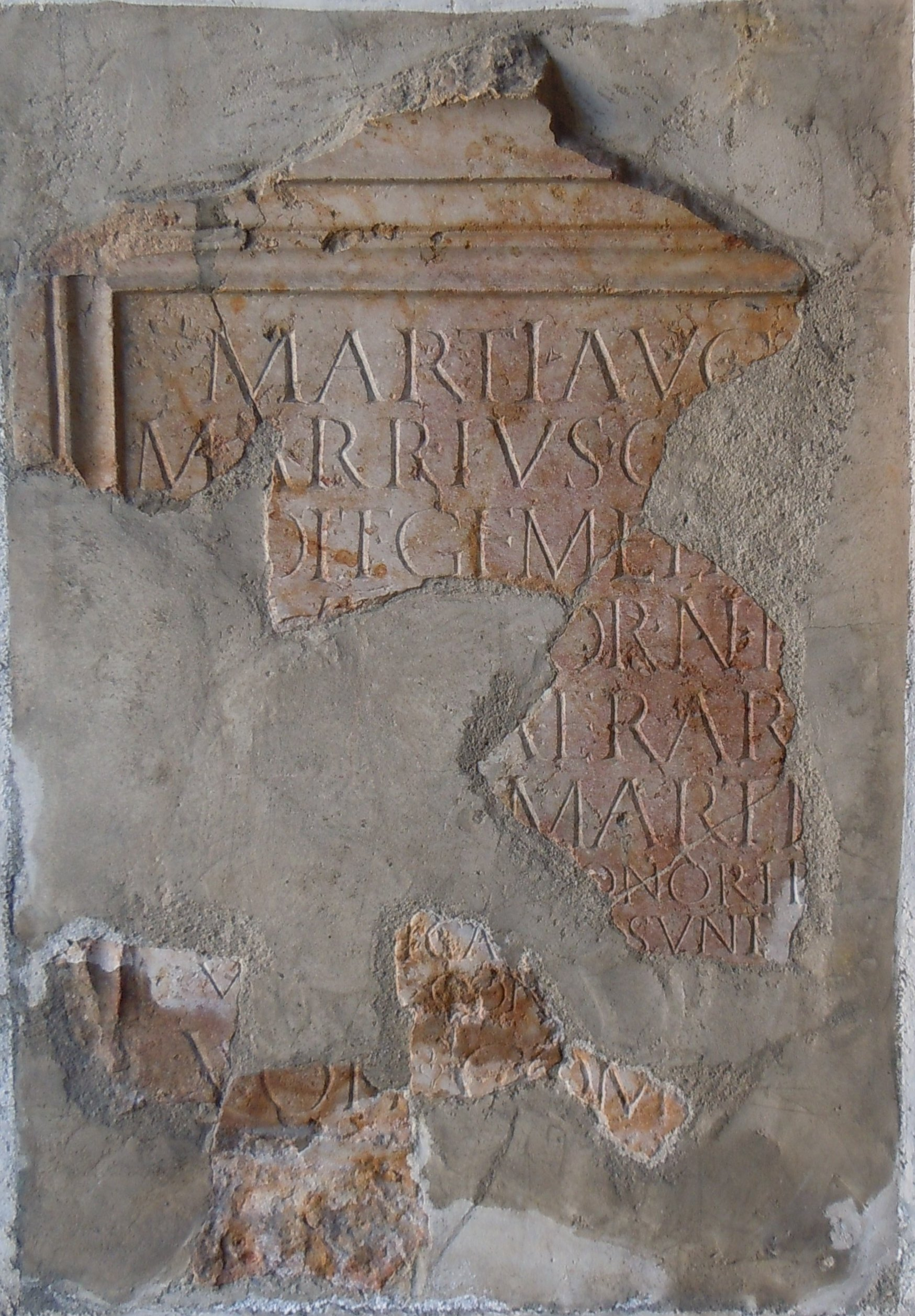
Fragmentary dedication stele to Mars Augustus from Roman Gaul

Augustus or Augusta was appended far and wide, "on monuments great and small," to the name of gods or goddesses, including Mars. The honorific marks the affiliation of a deity with Imperial cult. In Hispania, many of the statues and dedications to Mars Augustus were presented by members of the priesthood or sodality called the Sodales Augustales. These vows (vota) were usually fulfilled within a sanctuary of Imperial cult, or in a temple or precinct (templum) consecrated specifically to Mars. As with other deities invoked as Augustus, altars to Mars Augustus might be set up to further the well-being (salus) of the emperor, but some inscriptions suggest personal devotion. An inscription in the Alps records the gratitude of a slave who dedicated a statue to Mars Augustus as conservator corporis sui, the preserver of his own body, said to have been vowed ex iussu numinis ipsius, "by the order of the numen himself".

Mars Augustus appears in inscriptions at sites throughout the Empire, such as Hispania Baetica, Saguntum, and Emerita (Lusitania) in Roman Spain; Leptis Magna (with a date of 6–7 AD) in present-day Libya; and Sarmizegetusa in the province of Dacia.

=== Provincial epithets ===
In addition to his cult titles at Rome, Mars appears in a large number of inscriptions in the provinces of the Roman Empire, and more rarely in literary texts, identified with a local deity by means of an epithet. Mars appears with great frequency in Gaul among the Continental Celts, as well as in Roman Spain and Britain. In Celtic settings, he is often invoked as a healer. The inscriptions indicate that Mars's ability to dispel the enemy on the battlefield was transferred to the sick person's struggle against illness; healing is expressed in terms of warding off and rescue.

==== Celtic Mars ====
Mars is identified with a number of Celtic deities, some of whom are not attested independently.

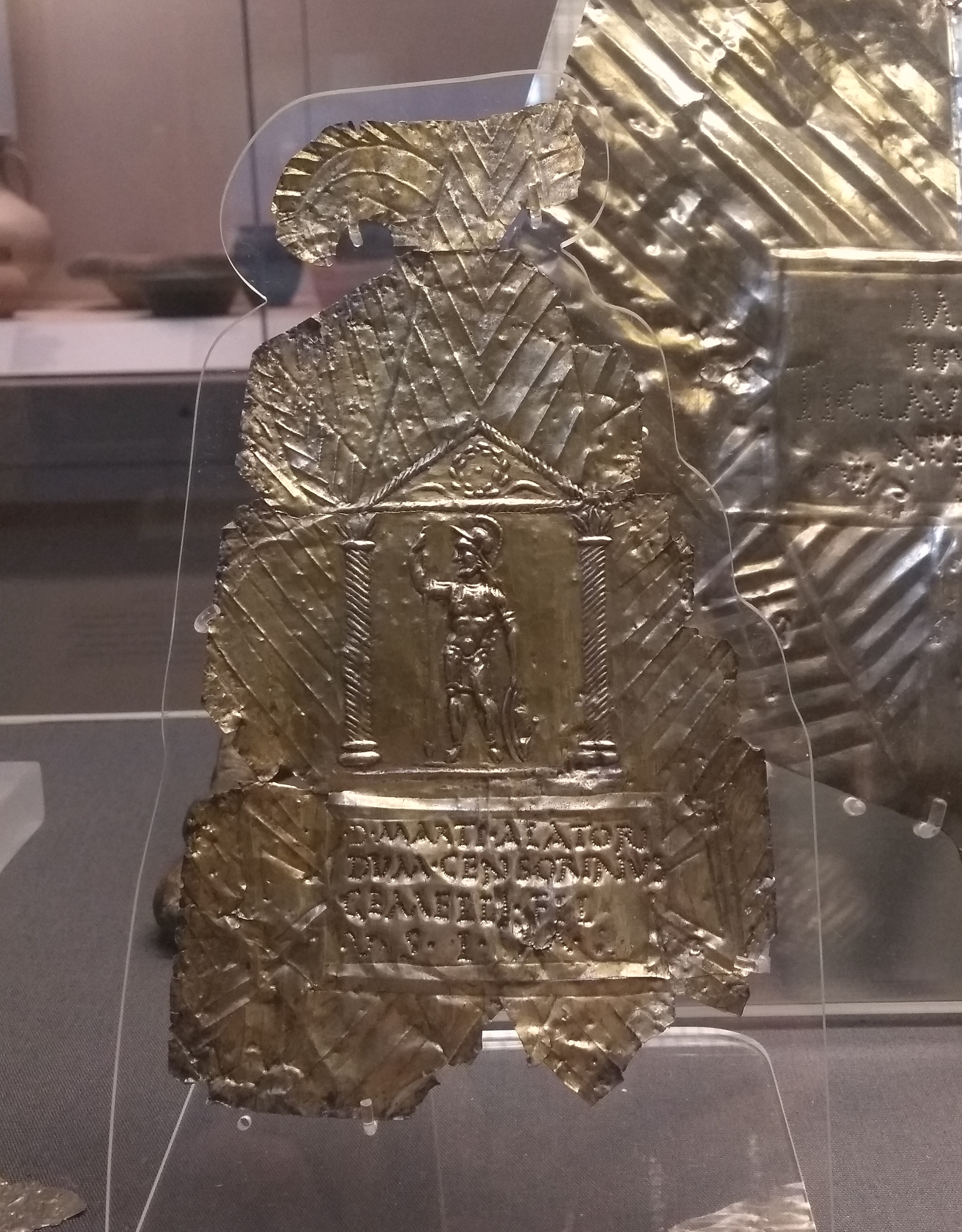
Votive plaque inscribed to Mars Alator from the Barkway hoard, Roman Britain

- Mars Alator is attested in Roman Britain by an inscription found on an altar at South Shields, and a silver-gilt votive plaque that was part of the Barkway hoard from Hertfordshire. Alator has been interpreted variously as "Huntsman" or "Cherisher".
- Mars Albiorix appears in an inscription from modern-day Sablet, in the province of Gallia Narbonensis. Albiorix probably means "King of the Land" or "King of the World", with the first element related to the geographical name Albion and Middle Welsh elfydd, "world, land". The Saturnian moon Albiorix is named after this epithet.
- Mars Barrex is attested by a single dedicatory inscription found at Carlisle, England. Barrex or Barrecis probably means "Supreme One" (Gaulish barro-, "head").
- Mars Belatucadrus is named in five inscriptions in the area of Hadrian's Wall. The Celtic god Belatucadros, with various spellings, is attested independently in twenty additional inscriptions in northern England.
- Mars Braciaca appears in a single votive inscription at Bakewell, Derbyshire. The Celtic epithet may refer to malt or beer, though intoxication in Greco-Roman religion is associated with Dionysus. A reference in Pliny suggests a connection to Mars's agricultural function, with the Gaulish word bracis referring to a type of wheat; a medieval Latin gloss says it was used to make beer.

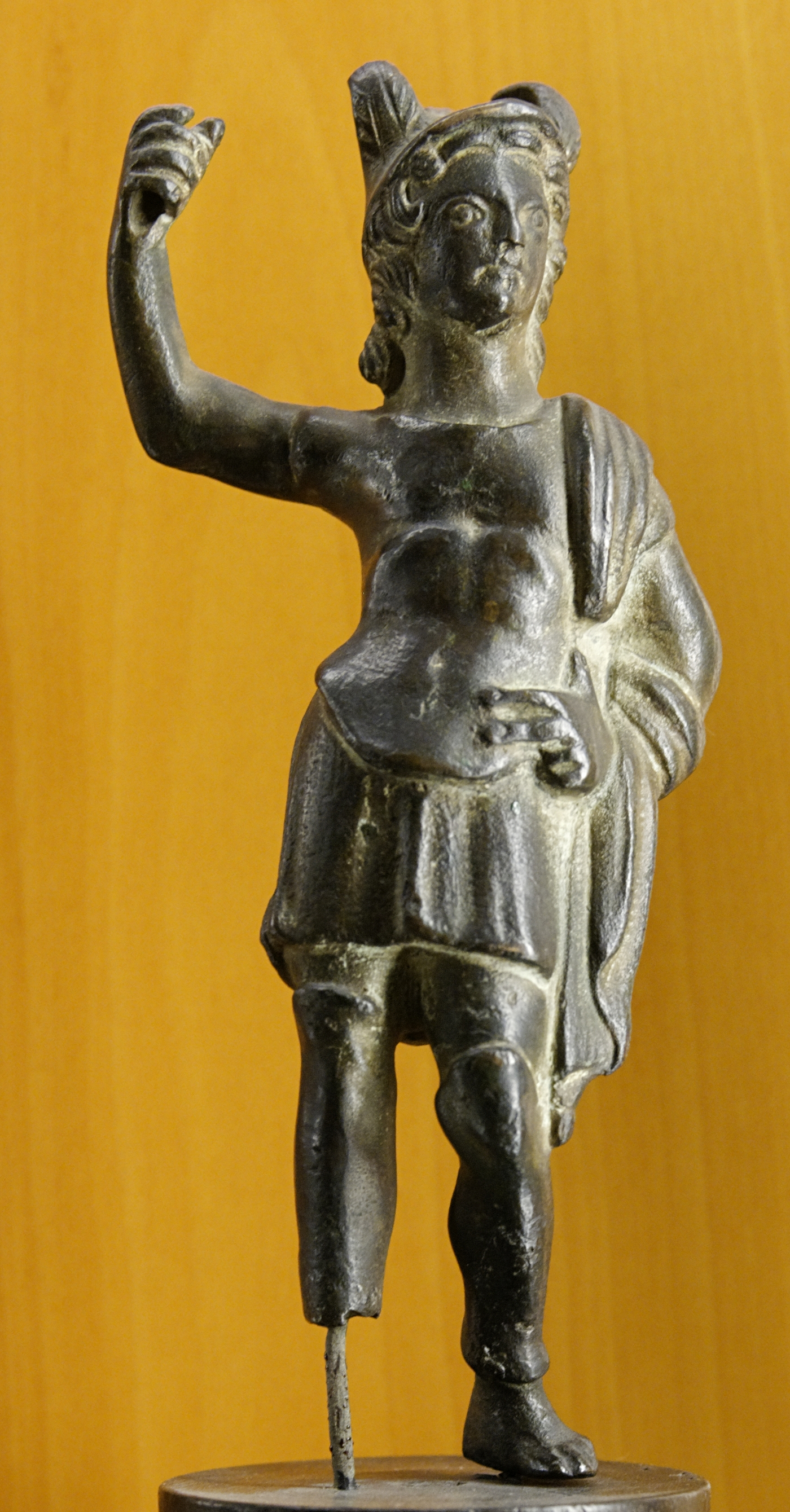
A bronze Mars from Gaul

- Mars Camulus is found in five inscriptions scattered over a fairly wide geographical area. The Celtic god Camulus appears independently in one votive inscription from Rome.
- Mars Cocidius is found in five inscriptions from northern England. About twenty dedications in all are known for the Celtic god Cocidius, mainly made by Roman military personnel, and confined to northwest Cumbria and along Hadrian's Wall. He is once identified with Silvanus. He is depicted on two votive plaques as a warrior bearing shield and spear, and on an altar as a huntsman accompanied by a dog and stag.
- Mars Condatis occurs in several inscriptions from Roman Britain. (Note: See Condatis > Archaeological evidence) The cult title is probably related to the place name Condate, often used in Gaul for settlements at the confluence of rivers. The Celtic god Condatis is thought to have functions pertaining to water and healing.
- Mars Corotiacus is an equestrian Mars attested only on a votive from Martlesham in Suffolk. A bronze statuette depicts him as a cavalryman, armed and riding a horse which tramples a prostrate enemy beneath its hooves.
- Mars Lenus, or more often Lenus Mars, had a major healing cult at the capital of the Treveri (present-day Trier). Among the votives are images of children offering doves. His consort Ancamna is also found with the Celtic god Smertrios.
- Mars Loucetius. The Celtic god Loucetios, Latinized as -ius, appears in nine inscriptions in present-day Germany and France and one in Britain, and in three as Leucetius. The Gaulish and Brythonic theonyms likely derive from Proto-Celtic *louk(k)et-, "bright, shining, flashing," hence also "lightning," alluding to either a Celtic commonplace metaphor between battles and thunderstorms (Old Irish torannchless, the "thunder feat"), or the aura of a divinized hero (the lúan of Cú Chulainn). The name is given as an epithet of Mars. The consort of Mars Loucetius is Nemetona, whose name may be understood as pertaining either to "sacred privilege" or to the sacred grove (nemeton), and who is also identified with the goddess Victoria. At the Romano-British site in Bath, a dedication to Mars Loucetius as part of this divine couple was made by a pilgrim who had come from the continental Treveri of Gallia Belgica to seek healing.
- Mars Medocius Campesium appears on a bronze plaque at a Romano-Celtic temple at Camulodunum (modern Colchester; see Mars Camulus above). The dedication was made between 222 and 235 CE by a self-identified Caledonian, jointly honoring Mars and the Victoria (Victory) of Severus Alexander. A Celto-Latin name Medocius or Medocus is known, and a link between Mars's epithet and the Irish legendary surgeon Miodhach has been conjectured. Campesium may be an error for Campestrium, "of the Campestres", the divinities who oversaw the parade ground, or "of the Compeses" may refer to a local place name or ethnonym.
- Mars Mullo is invoked in two Armorican inscriptions pertaining to Imperial cult. The name of the Celtic god Mullo, which appears in a few additional inscriptions, has been analyzed variously as "mule" and "hill, heap".
- Mars Neton or Neto was a Celtiberian god at Acci (modern Guadix). According to Macrobius, he wore a radiant crown like a sun god, because the passion to act with valor was a kind of heat. He may be connected to Irish Neit.
- Mars Nodens has a possible connection to the Irish mythological figure Nuada Airgetlám. The Celtic god Nodens was also interpreted as equivalent to several other Roman gods, including Mercury and Neptune. The name may have meant "catcher", hence a fisher or hunter.
- Mars Ocelus had an altar dedicated by a junior army officer at Caerwent, and possibly a temple. He may be a local counterpart to Lenus.
- Mars Olludius was depicted in a relief from Roman Britain without armor, in the guise of a Genius carrying a double cornucopia and holding a libation bowl (patera). Olloudius is found earlier in southern Gaul.
- Mars Rigisamus is found in two inscriptions, the earliest most likely the one at Avaricum (present-day Bourges, France) in the territory of the Bituriges. At the site of a villa at West Coker, Somerset, he received a bronze plaque votum. The Gaulish element rig- (very common at the end of names as -rix), found in later Celtic languages as rí, is cognate with Latin rex, "king" or more precisely "ruler". Rigisamus or Rigisamos is "supreme ruler" or "king of kings".
- Mars Rigonemetis ("King of the Sacred Grove"). A dedication to Rigonemetis and the numen (spirit) of the Emperor inscribed on a stone was discovered at Nettleham (Lincolnshire) in 1961. Rigonemetis is only known from this site, and it seems he may have been a god belonging to the tribe of the Corieltauvi.
- Mars Segomo. "Mars the Victorious" appears among the Celtic Sequani.
- Mars Smertrius. At a site within the territory of the Treveri, Ancamna was the consort of Mars Smertrius.
- Mars Teutates. A fusion of Mars with the Celtic god Teutates (Toutatis).
- Mars Thincsus. A form of Mars invoked at Housesteads Roman Fort at Hadrian's Wall, where his name is linked with two goddesses called the Alaisiagae. Anne Ross associated Thincsus with a sculpture, also from the fort, which shows a god flanked by goddesses and accompanied by a goose – a frequent companion of war gods.
- Mars Vorocius. A Celtic healer-god invoked at the curative spring shrine at Vichy (Allier) as a curer of eye afflictions. On images, the god is depicted as a Celtic warrior.

==== "Mars Balearicus" ====
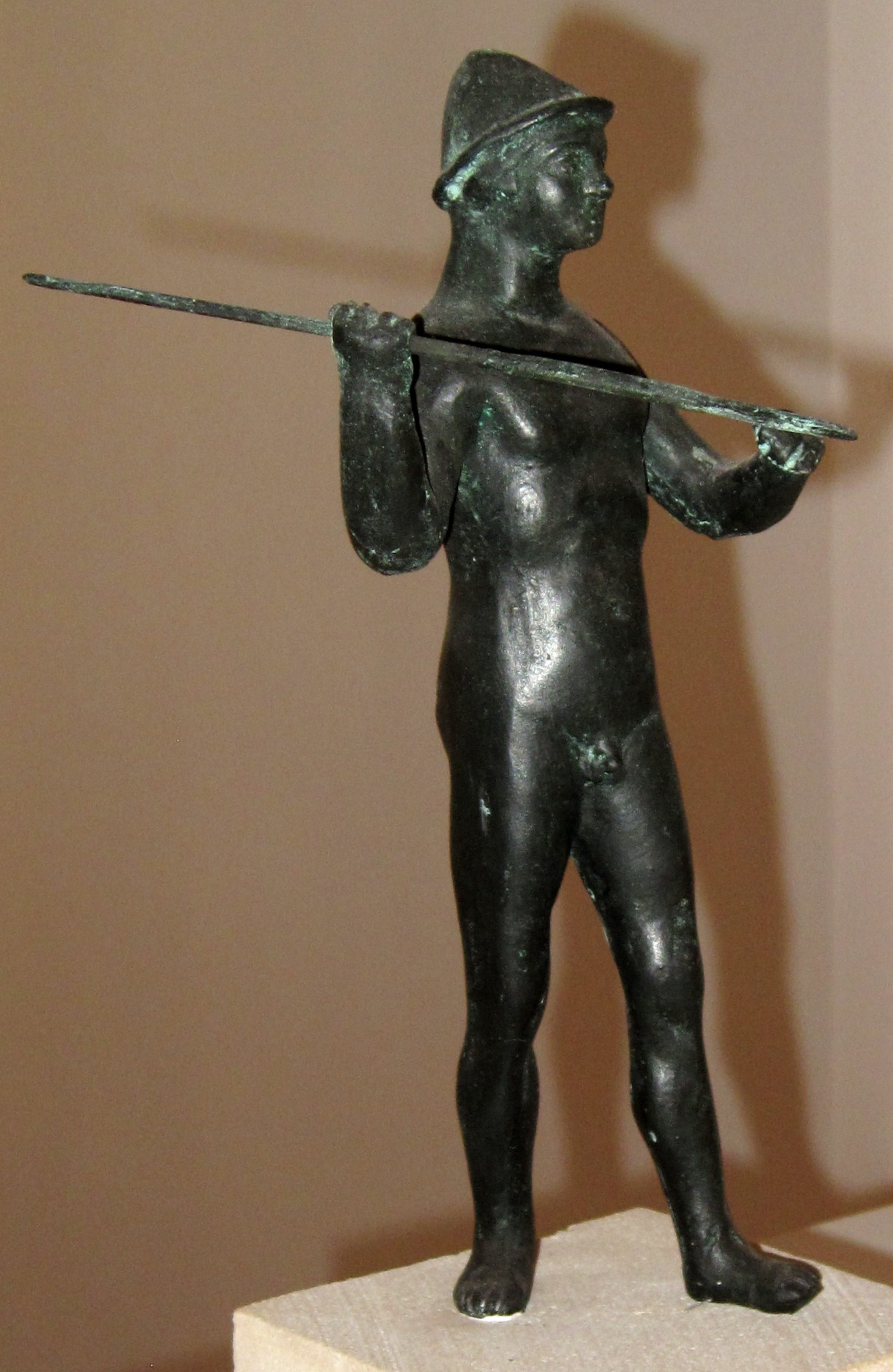
Bronze statuette of Mars Balearicus

"Mars Balearicus" is a name used in modern scholarship for small bronze warrior figures from Mallorca (one of the Balearic Islands) that are interpreted as representing the local Mars cult. These statuettes have been found within talayotic sanctuaries with extensive evidence of burnt offerings. "Mars" is fashioned as a lean, athletic nude lifting a lance and wearing a helmet, often conical; the genitals are perhaps semi-erect in some examples.

Other bronzes at the sites represent the heads or horns of bulls, but the bones in the ash layers indicate that sheep, goats, and pigs were the sacrificial victims. Bronze horse-hooves were found in one sanctuary. Another site held an imported statue of Imhotep, the legendary Egyptian physician. These sacred precincts were still in active use when the Roman occupation began in 123 BCE. They seem to have been astronomically oriented toward the rising or setting of the constellation Centaurus.

== On the calendar ==
Mars gave his name to the third month in the Roman calendar, Martius, from which English March derives. In the most ancient Roman calendar, Martius was the first month. The planet Mars was named for him, and in some allegorical and philosophical writings, the planet and the god are endowed with shared characteristics. In many languages, Tuesday is named for the planet Mars or the god of war: In Latin, martis dies (literally, 'Mars's Day'), survived in Romance languages as marte (Portuguese), martes (Spanish), mardi (French), martedì (Italian), marți (Romanian), and dimarts (Catalan). In Irish (Gaelic), the day is An Mháirt, while in Albanian it is e Marta. The English word Tuesday derives from Old English Tiwesdæg and means 'Tiw's Day', Tiw being the Old English form of the Proto-Germanic war god *Tîwaz, or Týr in Norse.

== See also ==
- Cariocecus, an Iberian war god syncretised with Mars
- Mars, the planet
- Nergal, the Babylonian god associated with the planet Mars in astral theology
- Planets in astrology#Mars
- Týr, the Norse god of war
