= Septimontium =

Ritual occasion in ancient Rome

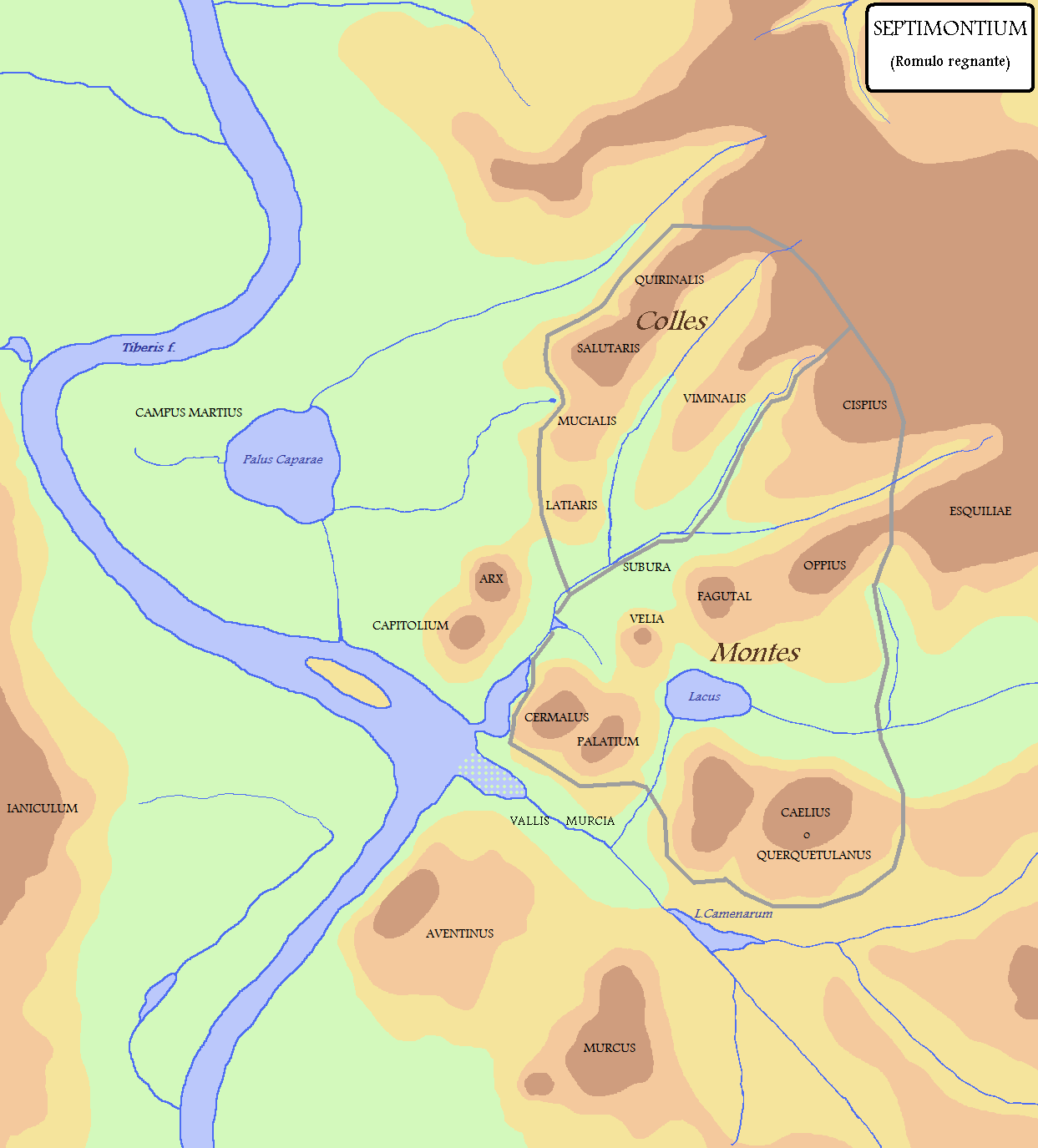
Map of the Seven hills of Rome

The Septimontium was a proto-urban festival celebrated in ancient Rome by montani, residents of the seven (sept-) communities associated with the hills or peaks of Rome (montes): Oppius, Palatium, Velia, Fagutal, Cermalus, Caelius, and Cispius. The Septimontium was celebrated in September, or, according to later calendars, on 11 December. It was not a public festival in the sense of feriae populi, according to Varro, who sees it as an urban analog to the rural Paganalia.

The etymology from septem ("seven") has been doubted; the festival may instead take its name from saept-, "divided," in the sense of "partitioned off, palisaded." The montes include two divisions of the Palatine Hill and three of the Esquiline Hill, among the traditional "seven hills of Rome".

Plutarch's notice of this festival is obscure, and confuses the nature of the Septimontium as represented by inscriptions and Festus with the proverbial seven hills of Rome. At this time, he notes, Romans refrained from operating horse-drawn vehicles.
