= Nerio =

War goddess, wife of Mars in Roman mythology

In ancient Roman religion and myth, Nerio (or Neriene) was an ancient war goddess and the personification of valor. She was the partner of Mars in ancient cult practices and was sometimes identified with the goddess Bellona, and occasionally with the goddess Minerva. Spoils taken from enemies were sometimes dedicated to Nerio by the Romans. Nerio was later supplanted by mythologized deities appropriated and adapted from other religions.

== Cult role ==
Ancient Roman literature seems to have pointed Nerio as one of two wives of war god Mars, the other being Moles.

== Etymology ==
The name of the goddess is thought to derive from a Proto-Indo-European word *h₂nḗr, related to Ancient Greek ἀνήρ ("anḗr," "man"), and both pertaining to the semantic field of masculine attributes, such as strength, vigour, valor.

Aulus Gellius, in his book Attic Nights, remarked that her name was a Sabine word meaning 'strength and fortitude'.

== Sources ==
- Grimal, Pierre. The Dictionary of Classical Mythology. Oxford: Basil Blackwell, 1986. ISBN 0-631-20102-5
