= Matronalia =

Ancient Roman festival celebrating Lucina

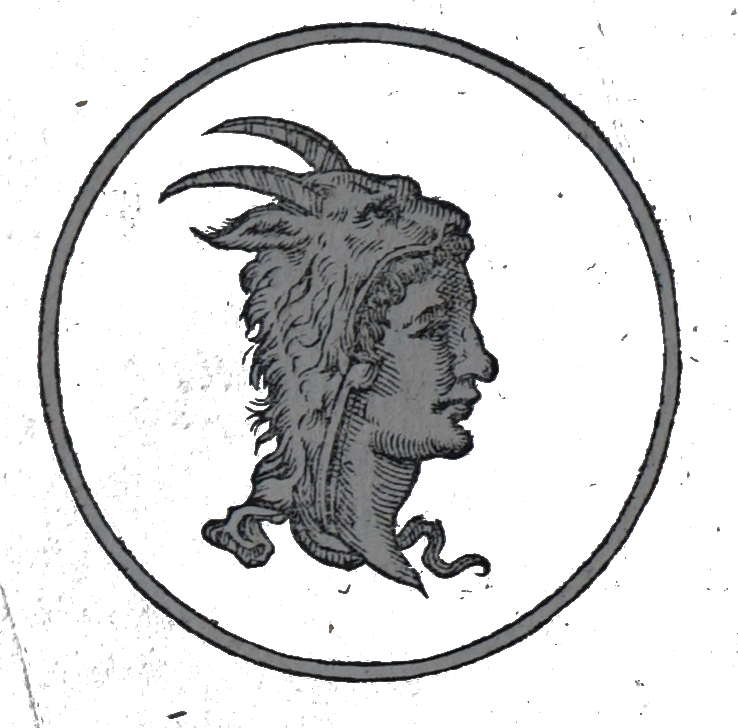
- Matronalia
- Also called: Matronales Feriae
- Observed by: Ancients Romans
- Type: Historical Roman
- Observances: Women received gifts from their husbands and daughters Men offered prayers for their wives Women prepared meals for slaves, who were given the day off work.
- Date: March 1

In ancient Roman religion, the Matronalia (or Matronales Feriae) was a festival celebrating Juno Lucina, the goddess of childbirth ("Juno who brings children into the light"), and of motherhood (mater is "mother" in Latin) and women in general. In the original Roman calendar traditionally thought to have been established by Romulus, it was the first day of the year. As the first day of March (Martius), the month of Mars, it was also the Feriae Martis.

The date of the festival was associated with the dedication of a temple to Juno Lucina on the Esquiline Hill circa 268 BCE, and possibly also a commemoration of the peace between the Romans and the Sabines. On the day, women would participate in rituals at the temple, although the details have not been preserved other than the observation that they wore their hair loose (when Roman decorum otherwise required them to wear it up), and were not allowed to wear belts or to knot their clothing in any place.

At home, women received gifts from their husbands and daughters, and Roman husbands were expected to offer prayers for their wives. Women were also expected to prepare a meal for the household slaves (who were given the day off work), as Roman men did at the Saturnalia.
