= Paludamentum =

Cloak or cape used in Republican and Imperial Rome

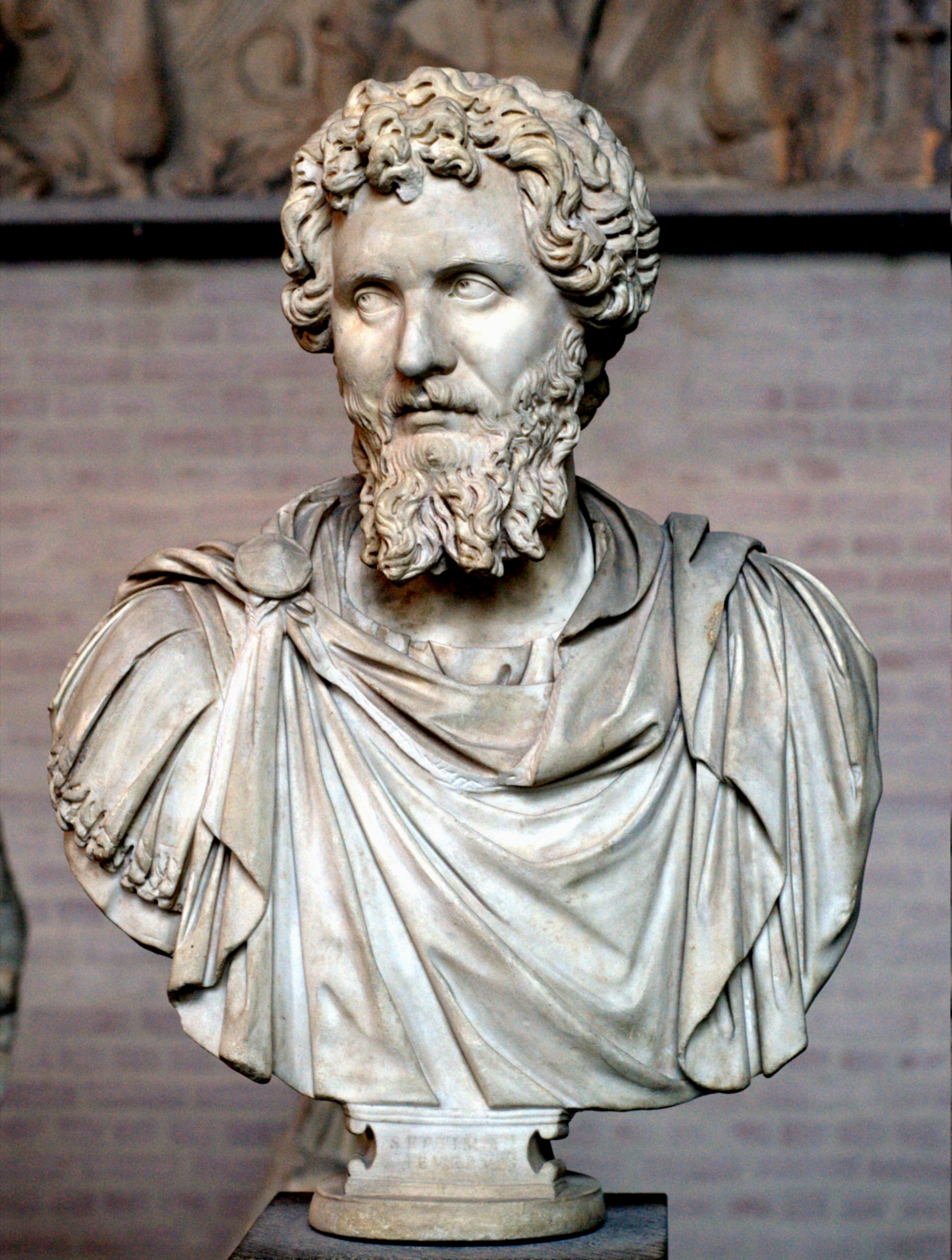
Bust of Septimius Severus wearing a paludamentum. Glyptothek, Munich

In Republican and Imperial Rome, the paludamentum (pl. paludamenta) was a cloak or cape fastened at one shoulder, worn by military commanders (e.g., the legatus) and rather less often by their troops. As supreme commander of the whole Roman army, Roman emperors were often portrayed wearing it in their statues and on their coinage. After the reign of Augustus, the paludamentum was restricted to the Emperor. Children would also wear it sometimes, when there was bad weather and they needed protection.

The paludamentum was generally crimson, scarlet, or purple in colour, or sometimes white. It was fastened at the shoulder with a clasp, called a fibula, whose form and size varied through time. Putting on the paludamentum was a ceremonial act on setting out for war.

== Etymology ==
According to Varro in De lingua latina L VII,37:

[...] paludamenta, which are distinguishing garments and adornments in the army; therefore when the general goes forth to war and the lictors have changed their garb and have sounded the signals, he is said to set forth paludatus, wearing the paludamentum. The reason why these garments are called paludamenta is that those who wear them are on account of them conspicuous and are made palam: plainly visible.
Paluda a paludamentis. Haec insignia atque ornamenta militaria: ideo ad bellum cum exit imperator ac lictores mutarunt vestem et signa incinuerunt, paludatus dicitur proficisci. Quae propterea, quod conspiciuntur qui ea habent ac fiunt palam, paludamenta dicta.

—De lingua latina ("On the Latin language")
