= Quinquatria =

Ancient Roman religious festival

- Also called: Quinquatrus
- Observed by: Roman Republic, Roman Empire
- Type: Classical Roman religion
- Date: 19 March

The Quinquatria or Quinquatrus was a festival in ancient Roman religion, sacred to the Goddess Minerva, celebrated 19–23 March. According to Varro, it was so called because it was held on the fifth (quinqu-) day after the Ides, in the same way as the Tusculans called a festival on the sixth day after the Ides Sexatrus or one on the seventh Septimatrus. Both Varro and Festus state that the Quinquatrus was celebrated for only one day, but Ovid says that it was celebrated for five days, hence the name: on the first day no blood was shed, but that on the last four there were contests of gladiators. The first day was the festival proper, and that the following four were an expansion made perhaps in the time of Caesar to gratify the people. The ancient Roman religious calendars assign only one day to the festival.

Ovid says that this festival was celebrated in commemoration of the birthday of Minerva, but according to Festus it was sacred to Minerva because her temple on the Aventine was consecrated on that day. On the fifth day of the festival, according to Ovid, the trumpets used in sacred rites were purified; but this seems to have been originally a separate festival called Tubilustrium, which ancient calendars place on 23 March. When the celebration of Quinquatrus was extended to five days, the Tubilustrium would have fallen on the last day of that festival.

As this festival was sacred to Minerva, it seems that women were accustomed to consult fortune-tellers and diviners upon this day. Domitian caused it to be celebrated every year in his Alban villa, situated at the foot of the Alban Hills, and instituted a collegium to superintend the celebration, which consisted of shows of wild beasts, of the exhibition of plays, and of contests of orators and poets.

There was also another festival of this name called Quinquatrus Minusculae or Quinquatrus Minores, celebrated on the Ides of June, on which the tibicines went through the city in procession to the temple of Minerva.

== Historical significance ==
At the Quinquatria in 59, Nero invited his mother, Agrippina the Younger, to his villa near Baiae in an attempt to assassinate her. His old tutor, Anicetus, whom he had raised to be captain of the fleet of Misenum, had undertaken to construct a vessel which could be sunk, without exciting suspicion. Agrippina landed at Bauli, between Baiae and Cape Misenum, and completed her journey in a litter. After the banquet, when night had fallen, she was induced to return to Bauli in the vessel which had been prepared for her destruction. But the mechanism did not work as planned, and Agrippina succeeded in swimming to shore, from which she proceeded to her villa on the Lucrine lake. Nero soon after succeeded in his goal, however, with further help from Anicetus.

== Sources ==
- Bury, John Bagnell. The Student's Roman Empire. Harper. 1893.
