= Tubilustrium =

Ceremony to make the army fit for war

In ancient Rome the month of March was the traditional start of the campaign season, and the Tubilustrium was a ceremony to make the army fit for war. The ceremony involved sacred trumpets called tubae.

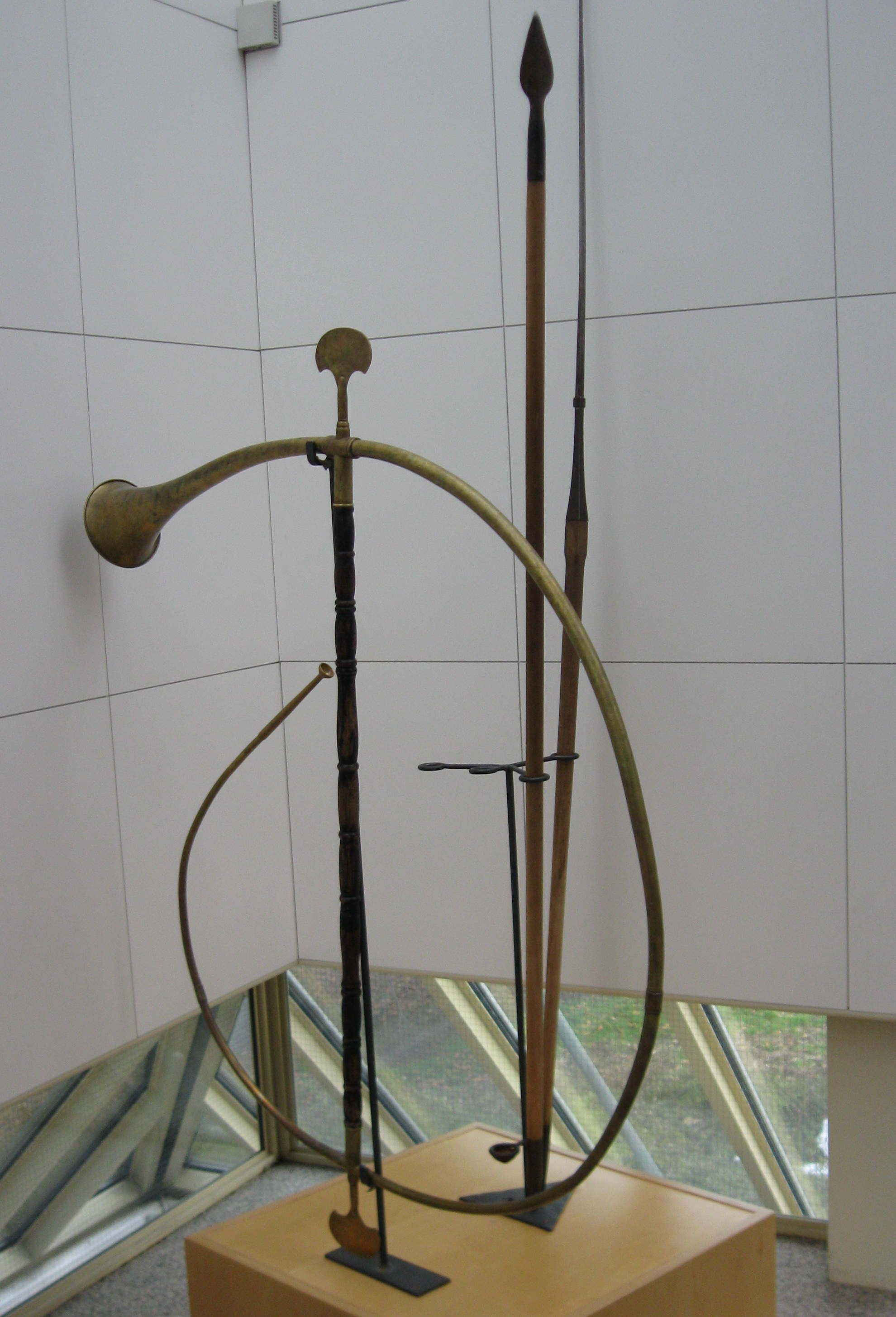
Cornu Aalen

Johannes Quasten, however, argues that the common term for war trumpets being tubae is not the same as the tubi form here. He states that tubi was only used for trumpets used in sacrifices and goes on to show how this ceremony was a feast to cleanse and purify the trumpets used in sacrifices – it is a good example, he argues, of the special connection between music and cult in Roman ritual.

The festival was held on March 23, the last day of the Quinquatria festival held in tribute to the Roman god Mars and Nerine, a Sabine goddess. The event took place again on May 23.

The ceremony was held in Rome in a building called the Hall of the Shoemakers (atrium sutorium) and involved the sacrifice of a ewe lamb. Romans who did not attend the ceremony would be reminded of the occasion by seeing the Salii dancing through the streets of the city.
