= Agonalia =

Religious observance of ancient Rome

- Also called: Agonia
- Observed by: Roman Republic, Roman Empire
- Type: Classical Roman religion
- Observances: animal sacrifice
- Date: January 9 May 21; December 11
- Frequency: thrice per year

An Agonalia or Agonia was an obscure archaic religious observance celebrated in ancient Rome several times a year, in honor of various divinities. Its institution, like that of other religious rites and ceremonies, was attributed to Numa Pompilius, the semi-legendary second king of Rome. Ancient calendars indicate that it was celebrated regularly on January 9, May 21, and December 11.

A festival called Agonia or Agonium Martiale, in honor of Mars, was celebrated March 17, the same day as the Liberalia, during a prolonged "war festival" that marked the beginning of the season for military campaigning and agriculture.

== Purpose ==
The offering was a ram (aries), the usual victim sacrificed to the guardian gods of the state. The presiding priest was the rex sacrificulus, and the site was the Regia, both of which could be employed only for ceremonies connected with the highest gods that affected the wellbeing of the whole state. But the purpose of this festival was disputed even among the ancients themselves.

== Etymology ==
The etymology of the name was also a subject of much dispute among the ancients. The various etymologies proposed are given at length by Ovid. None of these, however, is satisfactory. One possibility is that the sacrifice in its earliest form was offered on the Quirinal Hill, which was originally called Agonus, at the Colline gate, Agonensis. The sacrifice is explicitly located at the Regia, or the domus regis ("house of the king"), which in the historical period was at the top of the Via Sacra, near the arch of Titus, though one ancient source states that in earliest times, the Regia was on the Quirinal.

The Circus Agonensis, as it is called, is supposed by some to have occupied the place of the present Piazza Navona, and to have been built by the emperor Alexander Severus on the spot where the victims were sacrificed at the Agonalia. It may not, however, have been a circus at all, and Humphrey omits the site in his work on Roman circuses.

== January 9 ==
An Agonium occurs on January 9 in the Fasti Praenestini, albeit in mutilated form. In Ovid's poem on the Roman calendar, he calls it once the dies agonalis ("agonal day") and elsewhere the Agonalia, and offers a number of etymologies of varied plausibility. Festus explains the word agonia as an archaic Latin term for hostia, a sacrificial victim. Augustine of Hippo thought the Romans had a god named Agonius, who might then have been the god of the Colline part of the city (see "Etymology" above).

== December 11 ==
This third occurrence of the Agonia or Agonalia shares the date of December 11 with the Septimontium or Septimontiale sacrum, which only very late Roman calendars take note of and which depends on a textual conjecture. The relation between the two observances, if any exists, is unknown. A fragmentary inscription found at Ostia that reads: "Agonind" testifies that this festival was dedicated to Sol Indiges. It was indeed the second festival celebrating this deity, after that of August 10.

== Agonium Martiale ==
The Agonia to Mars occurs during a period of festivals in March (Latin Martius), the namesake month of Mars. These were the chariot races of the Equirria February 27, a feria on the Kalends of March (a day sacred also to his mother Juno), a second Equirria on March 14, his Agonalia March 17, and the Tubilustrium March 23.

A note on the holiday from Varro indicates that this Agonia was of more recondite significance than the Liberalia held on the same day. Varro's source is the books of the Salian priests surnamed Agonenses, who call it the Agonia instead. According to Masurius Sabinus, the Liberalia was called the Agonium Martiale by the pontiffs. Modern scholars are inclined to think that the sharing of the date was a coincidence, and that the two festivals were unrelated.
