= Ludi Apollinares =

Ancient Roman festival

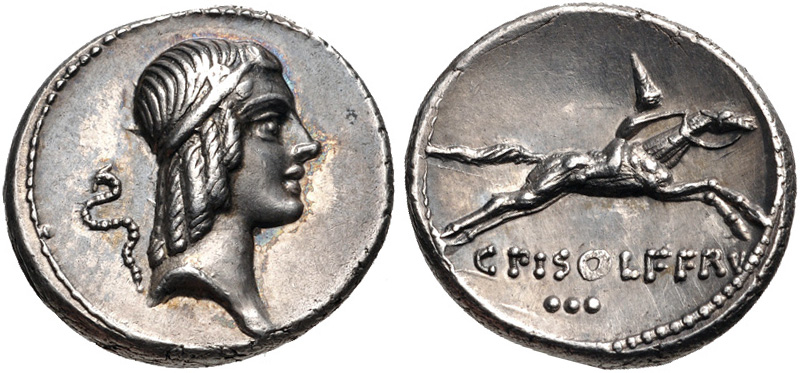
Denarius minted by Gaius Calpurnius Piso Frugi in 67 BC, depicting the head of Apollo on the obverse and a desultor on the reverse. Both sides of the coin refer to the Ludi Apollinares.

The Ludi Apollinares were solemn games (ludi) held annually by the ancient Romans in honor of the god Apollo. The tradition goes that at the first celebration hereof, they were suddenly invaded by the enemy, and obliged to take to their arms. A cloud of darts and arrows fell upon their enemies, and the Romans soon returned victorious to their sports.

== First ludi ==
The games were established after inspecting a collection of prophecies, the Carmina Marciana. One of several seers (vates) responsible for these predictions was Marcius. The games were organized in accordance with the Oracles of Marcius, which had predicted the disaster at Cannae (the defeat of the Romans by Hannibal)

The prophecies dictated that the Romans should use Greek ritual to honor Diana and Latona, and that they should help contribute to the costs of the games, according to their means. The Sibylline Books were also consulted and confirmed this prophecy. This occurred at the height of the Second Punic War, when Hannibal was invading northern Italy. As in other times, the games were used to allay the public’s fears and distract them from Hannibal’s invasion.

The games were held in the Circus Maximus, with equestrian games as well as stage performances, including praetextae, a category of Roman drama. Ennius (239–169 BC) had Thyestes performed as part of this festival in 169 BC. The Ludi Apollinares received less funding from the Roman government than other games/festivals such as the Ludi Romani or Ludi Plebeii, because it was shorter and had only one day of races.

== Timing ==
The Ludi Apollinares were games which were first organized in 212 BC, when C. Sulla was praetor. Initially a vow was made to hold them only once. There is some discussion as to who officially made them annual games.

One version of events proposes that L. Varus, the praetor urbanus at the time, renewed this vow and celebrated them again in 210 BC. They were made an annual festival by a law in 208 BC by L. Varus, who was then curule aedile. A severe plague in 208 BC may have prompted the Senate to make them permanent, in honor of Apollo, who they regarded as a god of healing. From this day on, they were celebrated on 13 July and eventually grew to last 8 or 9 days.

However, Livy suggests that it was C. Calpurnius Piso, not L. Varus, who made the games permanent as praetor in 211 BC. "The Games of Apollo had been exhibited the previous year, and when the question of their repetition the next year was moved by the praetor Calpurnius, the senate passed a decree that they should be observed for all time." He continues, “…Such is the origin of the Apollinarian Games, which were instituted for the cause of victory and not, as is generally thought, in the interests of the public health.”

== Bibliography ==
- Michael Crawford, Roman Republican Coinage, Cambridge University Press, 1974.
