= Ludi Triumphales =

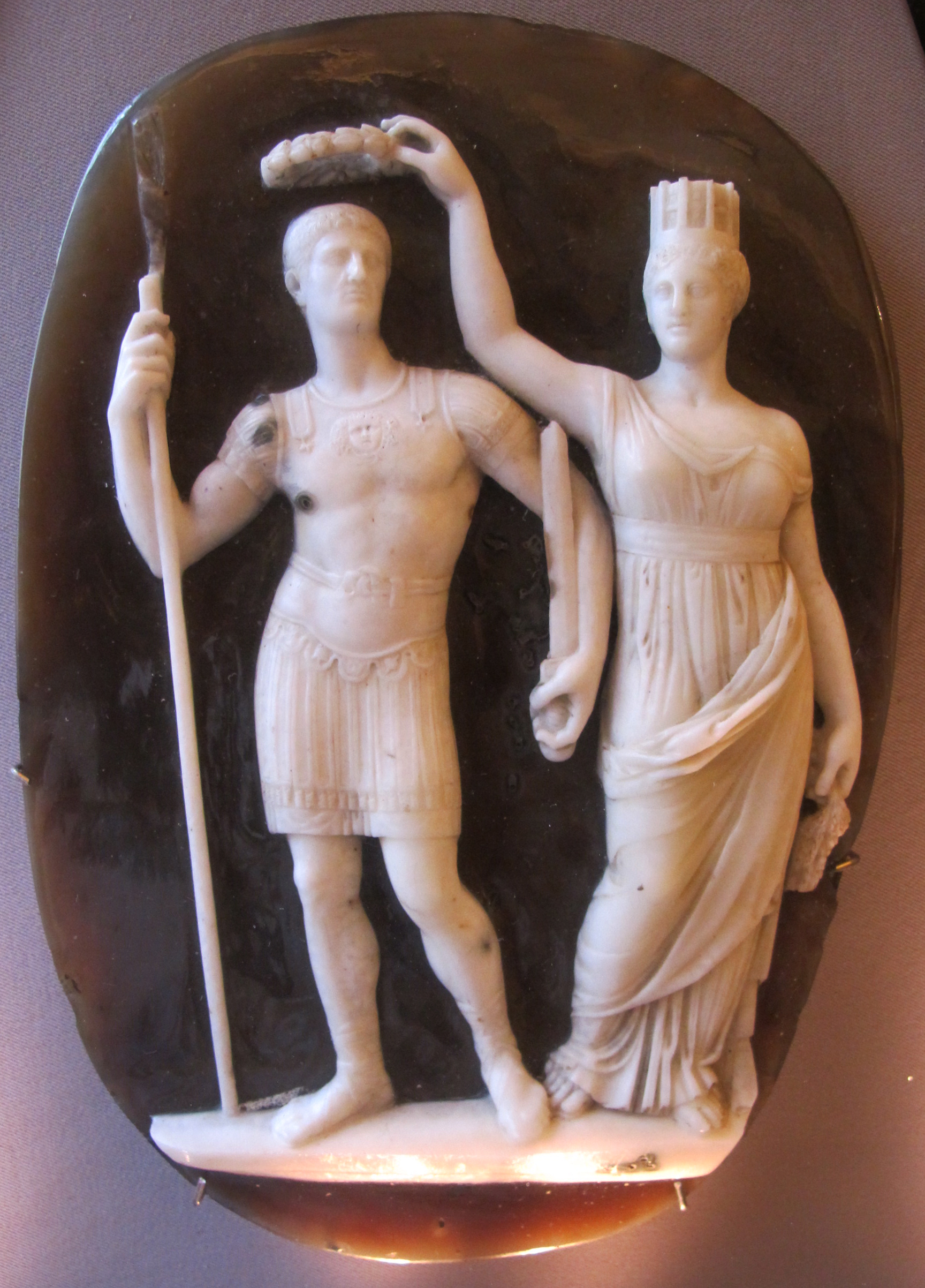
Constantine I receiving a wreath from the Tyche of Constantinople (sardonyx cameo)

In the Roman Empire of the 4th century, the Ludi Triumphales ("Triumphal Games") were games (ludi) held annually September 18–22 to commemorate the victory of Constantine over Licinius at Chalcedon in 324. No description of these games has survived, but they are significant in the historical transformation of Roman religious and state institutions under the Christian emperors, an era inaugurated by the conversion of Constantine. Forty-eight circus races (ludi circenses) are recorded for September 18, which was also celebrated as the birthday (dies natalis) of the emperor Trajan.

== On the calendar ==
The first day of the Ludi Triumphales—chosen in 335 for Constantine's elevation of his nephew as Caesar—coincided on the Roman calendar with the conclusion of the Ludi Romani ("Roman Games"), votive games for Jupiter Optimus Maximus ("Jupiter Best and Greatest"). The Roman Games were the oldest games instituted by the Romans, dating from 509 BC, and took up about half the month, running September 5–19 on the Julian calendar. Typically, the last day of victory games would mark the date of the actual victory, which in the case of Chalcedon was September 18. A five-day program of games would have placed the opening day of the Ludi Triumphales on September 13, the Ides, a religiously fraught day that Constantine presumably wished to avoid.

The Ides of September occurred in the middle of the Roman Games, when a major banquet for Jupiter had been held since Rome's archaic period. In the earliest period of Roman history, a nail-driving ritual in the Temple of Jupiter marked the passing of the political year, with the consuls at that time taking office on the Ides. The Byzantine antiquarian Johannes Lydus noted that this was one of three Roman new years: the priestly year began in January, the national in March, and the political cycle in September, which was also the beginning of the Imperial Roman tax year. The nail-driving ceremony occurred on the anniversary (dies natalis) of the temple, in a sacred space (templum) devoted to Minerva, on the right side of the shrine (aedes) of Jupiter.

== Victory games ==
The Ludi Triumphales are one of nine imperial military victories recorded on the Calendar of Filocalus (354 AD). Eight of these are connected to the Constantinian dynasty, since the celebration of victory games is usually confined to the dynasty. The Triumphales began with the unusually high number of circus races on the opening day of September 18.

== See also ==
- Victory Day
