= Hercules in ancient Rome =

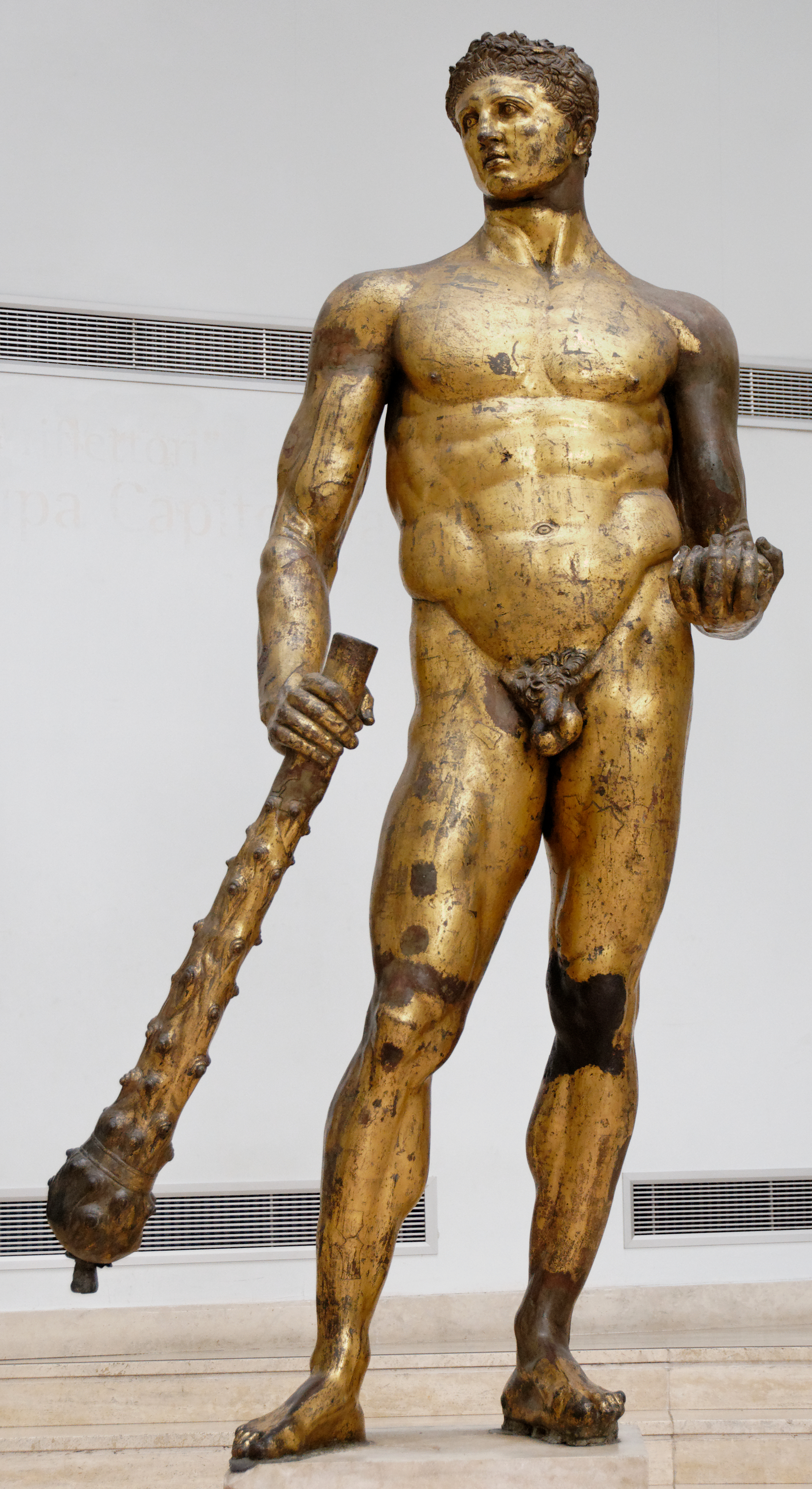
Hercules of the Forum Boarium

In ancient Roman religion and myth, Hercules was venerated as a divinized hero and incorporated into the legends of Rome's founding. The Romans adapted Greek myths and the iconography of Heracles into their own literature and art, but the hero developed distinctly Roman characteristics. Some Greek sources as early as the 6th and 5th century BC gave Heracles Roman connections during his famous labors.

Dionysius of Halicarnassus places Hercules among divine figures honored at Rome "whose souls after they had left their mortal bodies are said to have ascended to Heaven and to have obtained the same honors as the gods". His apotheosis thus served as one model during the Empire for the concept of the deified emperor.

== Temples and topography ==
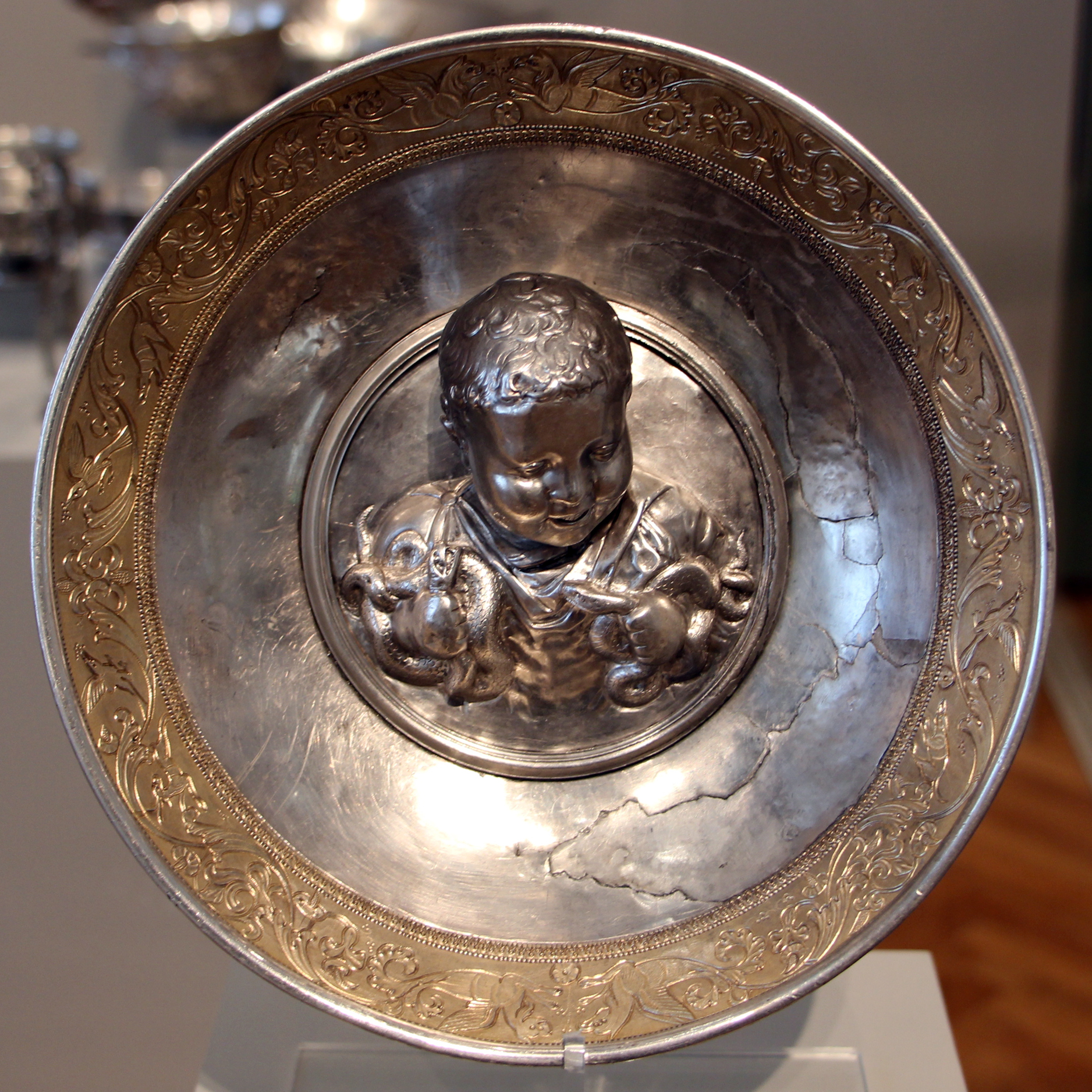
A Roman gilded silver bowl depicting the boy Hercules strangling two serpents, from the Hildesheim Treasure, 1st century AD, Altes Museum

The cult of Hercules reached Rome as early as the 6th century BC, celebrated at a temple next to the shrine of Carmenta and the Carmental Gate. By the 5th century BC, the mythological tradition was well established that Hercules had visited Rome during his tenth labor, when he stole the cattle of Geryon in the far west and drove them through Italy. Several Augustan writers offer narratives of the hero's time in Rome to explain the presence of the Ara Maxima dedicated to Hercules in the Forum Boarium, the cattle market named after Geryon's stolen herd.

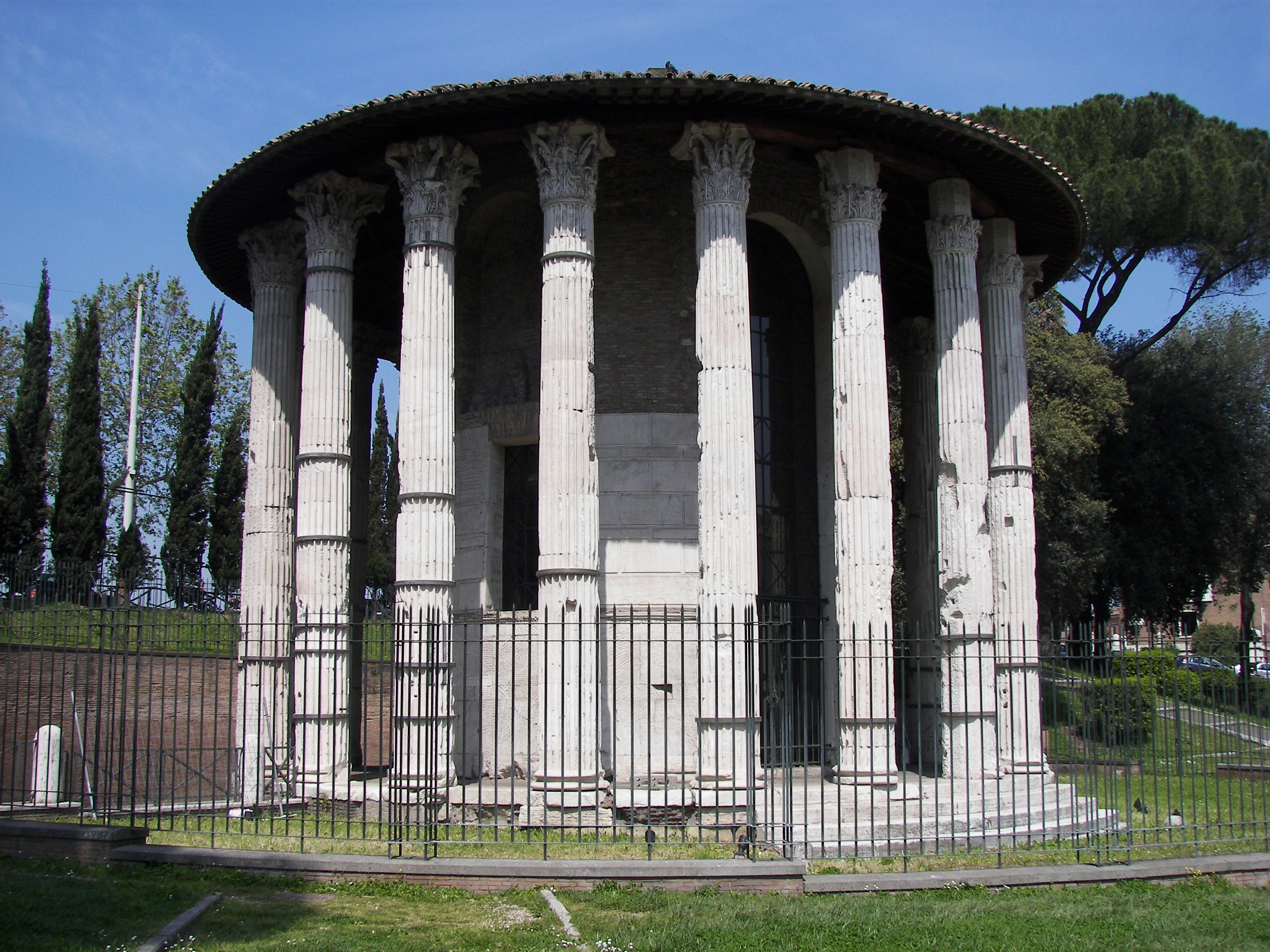
Temple of Hercules Victor, Rome

The Temple of Hercules Victor, which still stands, is atypically round, as was the first Temple of Hercules Musarum near the Circus Flaminius. The latter displayed fasti attributed to its founder Marcus Fulvius Nobilior, which Rüpke places among the earliest Latin antiquarian literature. The poet Ennius may have influenced or contributed to their composition. Fulvius Nobilior had attracted harsh criticism for enriching himself excessively with booty plundered from Greek temples during his military campaigns. When he became censor, he erected a portico around an earlier temple of Hercules, most likely that of Hercules Magnus Custos ("Hercules the Great Guardian") in the Campus Martius. He then transferred a statue group of the Muses from his private collection to dedicate at the temple, which later housed the Roman poets' guild (collegium poetarum).

Several place names in Italy were connected to Hercules' adventures. Vitulia as a name for the Italian peninsula supposedly came into usage because Hercules chased a runaway bullock (vitulus) there.

The altar of Jupiter Praestes at Tibur was also alleged to have been established by Hercules himself.

== Cult titles ==
- Hercules Augustus or Hercules Augusti, Hercules "in his capacity as protector of the ruling emperor."
- Hercules Invictus ("the Unconquered"), at the Ara Maxima; women were excluded from this cult. Also Hercules Victor ("the Victorious").
- Hercules Magnus ("the Great"), honored with games (ludi) that may have been first officially established by Sulla.
- Hercules Musarum ("the Muses' Hercules", Greek Herakles Musagetes), created when Fulvius Nobilior dedicated statues of the Muses to a temple of Hercules.
- Hercules Olivarius ("the Olive Merchant"), in reference to a statue of Hercules dedicated by the guild of olive merchants.
- Hercules Salarius, ("of Salt"), worshipped at Alba Fucens
- Hercules Triumphalis ("Triumphal"), represented by a statue in the Forum Boarium, was dressed in the regalia of a triumphator when a triumph was held. It is mentioned by Pliny, who attributes it to the legendary Evander.
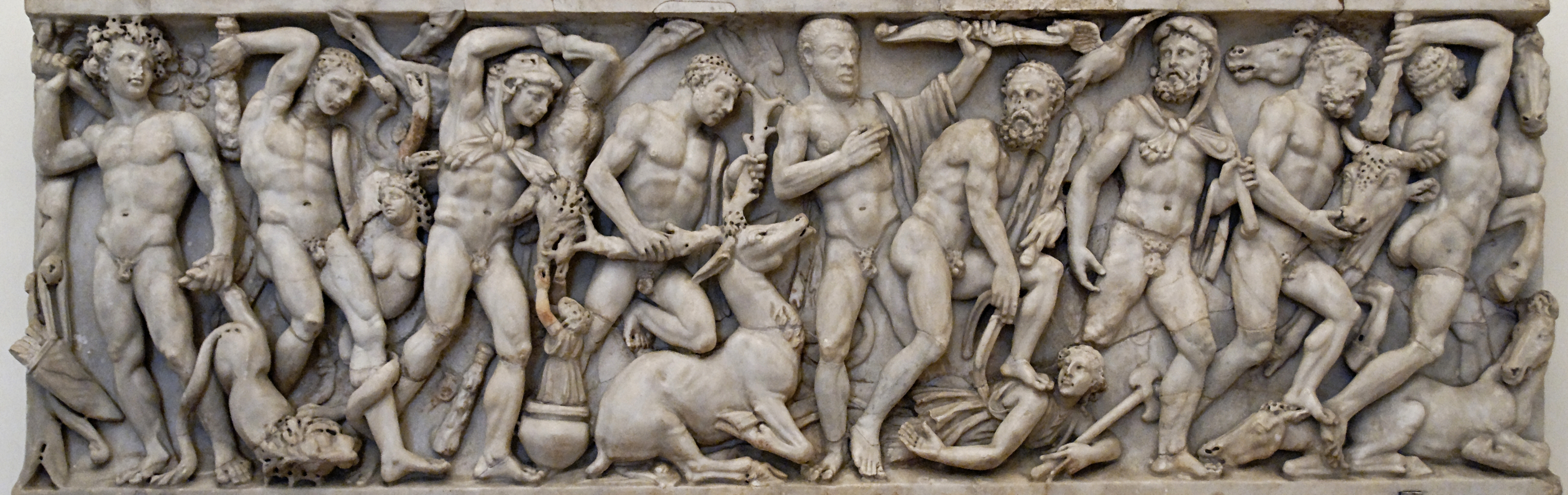
Roman sarcophagus (3rd century AD) depicting a sequence of the Labours of Hercules: the Nemean lion, the Lernaean Hydra, the Erymanthian boar, the Ceryneian hind, the Stymphalian birds, the belt of Hippolyta, the Augean stables, the Cretan Bull, and the Mares of Diomedes

== Festivals and rituals ==
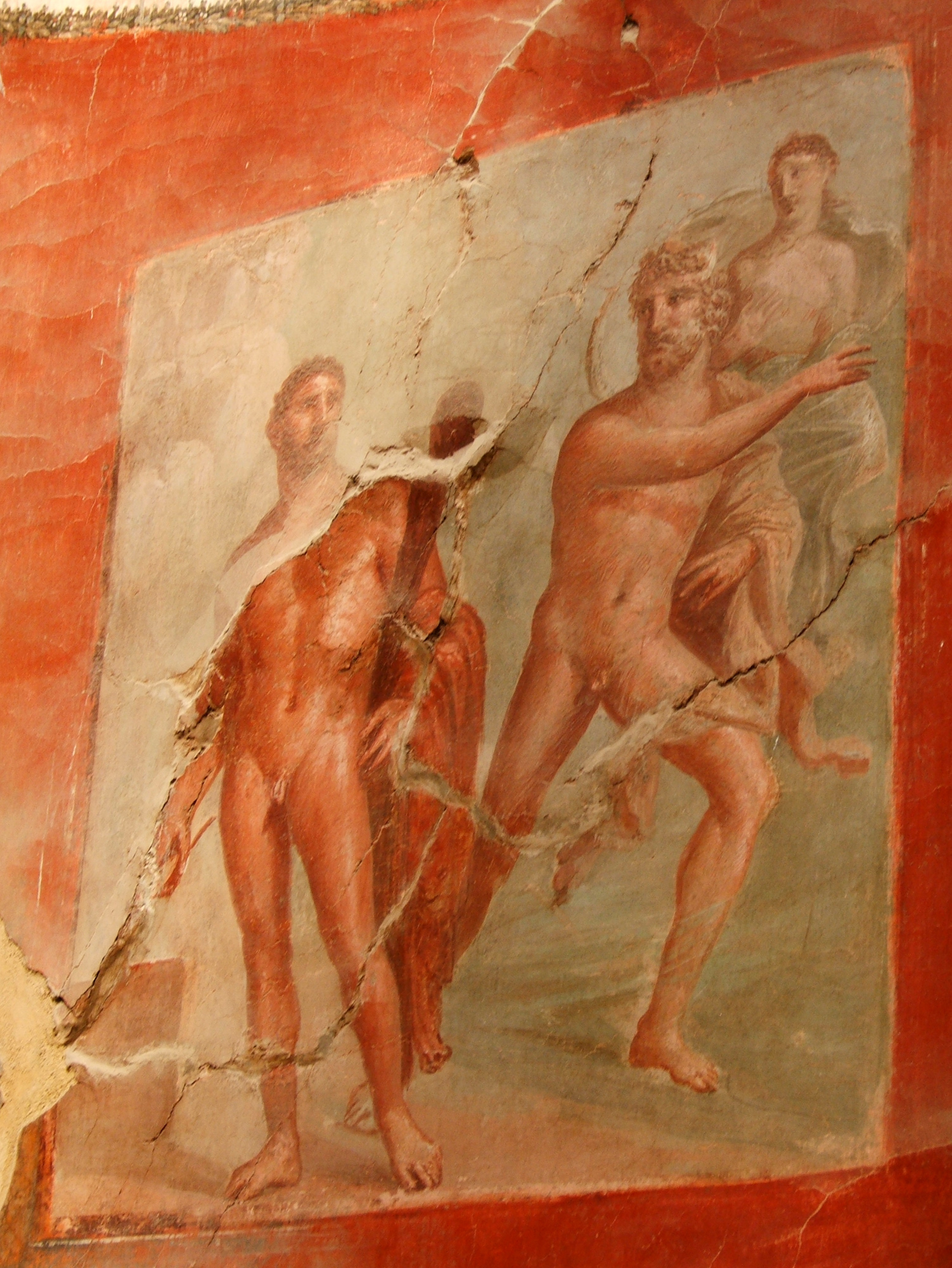
A fresco from Herculaneum depicting Heracles and Achelous from Greco-Roman mythology, 1st century AD

Normally only those celebrating the rites took part in the communal meal that followed a sacrifice, but at the Ara Maxima, all male citizens were invited. None of the meat that resulted from the sacrifice could be allowed to remain at the end of the day, nor could it be removed from the precinct, so it all had to be eaten. Women were excluded from this rite. Macrobius explains:

When Hercules with Geryon's cattle was journeying over the fields of Italy, a woman, in reply to his request for water to quench his thirst, said that she was not allowed to give him any because it was the feast of the Women's Goddess and no man was permitted to taste of anything that concerned it. Hercules therefore, when he intended to institute a sacrifice, solemnly forbade women to be admitted, ordering Potitius and Pinarius who were in charge of the rites not to allow any woman to be present.

The "women's goddess" (dea feminarum) is usually taken as the Bona Dea. This relationship, however, should perhaps be thought of as complementary as well as adversarial; Hercules, Bona Dea, and Silvanus were honored jointly with a shrine and an altar in Regio XIII at Rome. The "Good Goddess" is identifiable with several goddesses, and in this instance her enmity with Hercules recalls that of Juno. She also shared some characteristics with Ceres, with whom Hercules was honored jointly on December 21, with the sacrifice of a pregnant sow, loaves of bread, and mulsum, sweet wine.

Hercules was among the divinities honored at the first lectisternium held at Rome in 399 BC.

== In Stoicism ==
Heracles or Hercules was a figure especially favored by the Stoics, who attempted to incorporate traditional polytheism into their philosophy. In Stoicism, not only was the primitive substance God, the one supreme being, but divinity could be ascribed to the manifestations—to the heavenly bodies, to the forces of nature, even to deified persons.

Cornutus saw his Twelve Labours as metaphors for human struggles, seeing the Erymanthian boar, the Nemean lion and the Cretan bull as symbols of passion, the Cerynean deer as cowardice, the cleaning of the Augean stables as purification from extravagance, the driving away of the Stymphalian birds as banishing empty hopes, the kill of the Lernaean Hydra as the rejection of endless pleasures, and the chaining of Cerberus as the philosophy being brought from the darkness.

== Genealogy and patronage ==
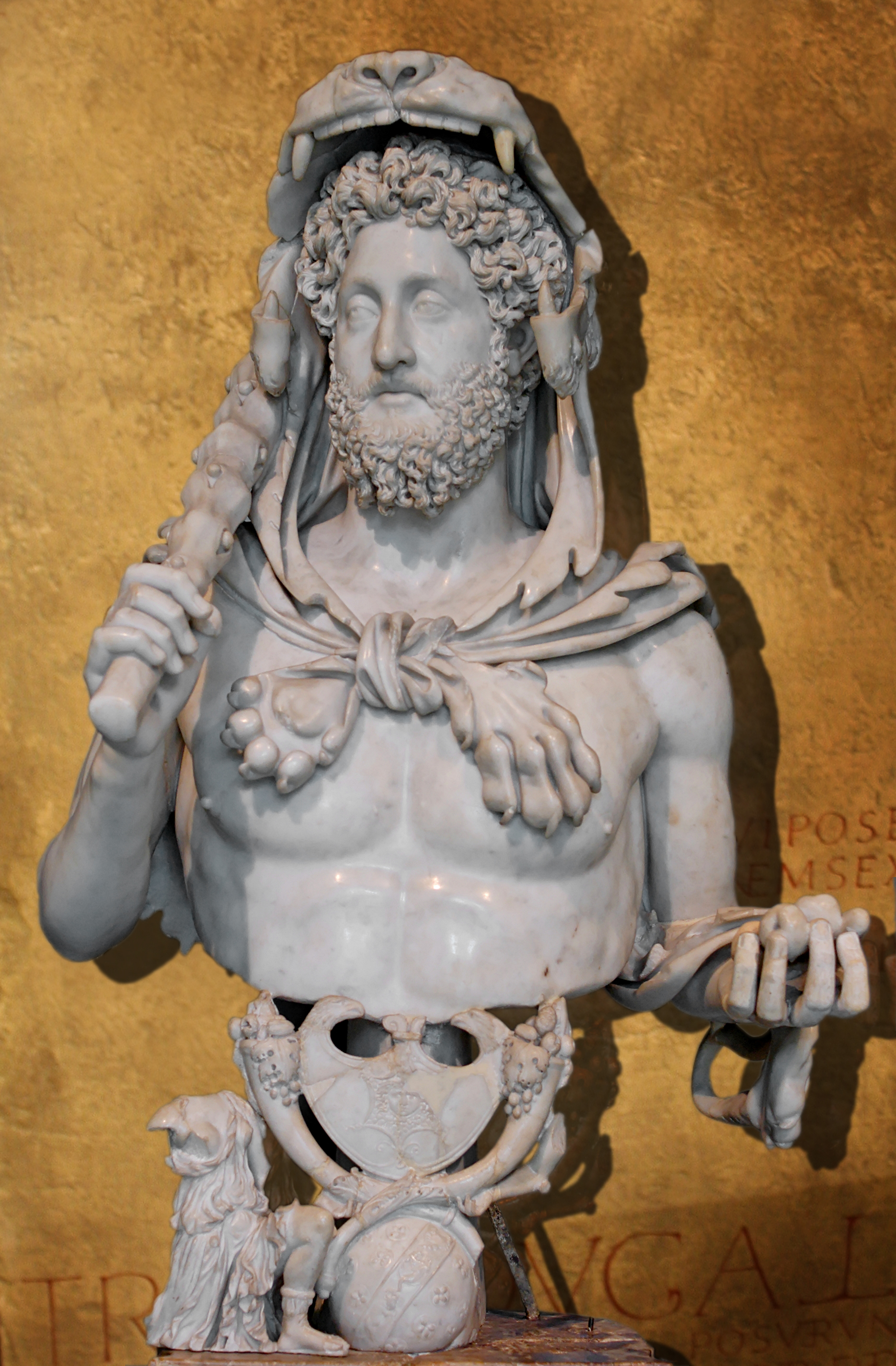
Bust of the emperor Commodus dressed as Hercules

Several Roman clans (gentes) lay claim to descent from various divine figures. The Fabii traced their genealogy to a daughter of Evander who lay with Hercules in his "dug-out" (fovea) and conceived the first Fabius.

The cult of Hercules at the Ara Maxima was in the keeping of the gens Potitia and the gens Pinaria until 312 BC, when maintenance was transferred to the state and thereafter administered by public slaves.

== Bibliography ==
- Eppinger, Alexandra (2015). Hercules in der Spätantike. Die Rolle des Heros im Spannungsfeld von Heidentum und Christentum [Hercules in Late Antiquity. The role of the hero in the conflict between paganism and Christianity]. Philippika, vol. 89. Wiesbaden: Harrassowitz, ISBN 978-3-447-10418-0.
- Ogden, Daniel (ed.) (2021). The Oxford Handbook of Heracles. Oxford: Oxford University Press.
