= Ludi Plebeii =

Ancient Roman religious festival

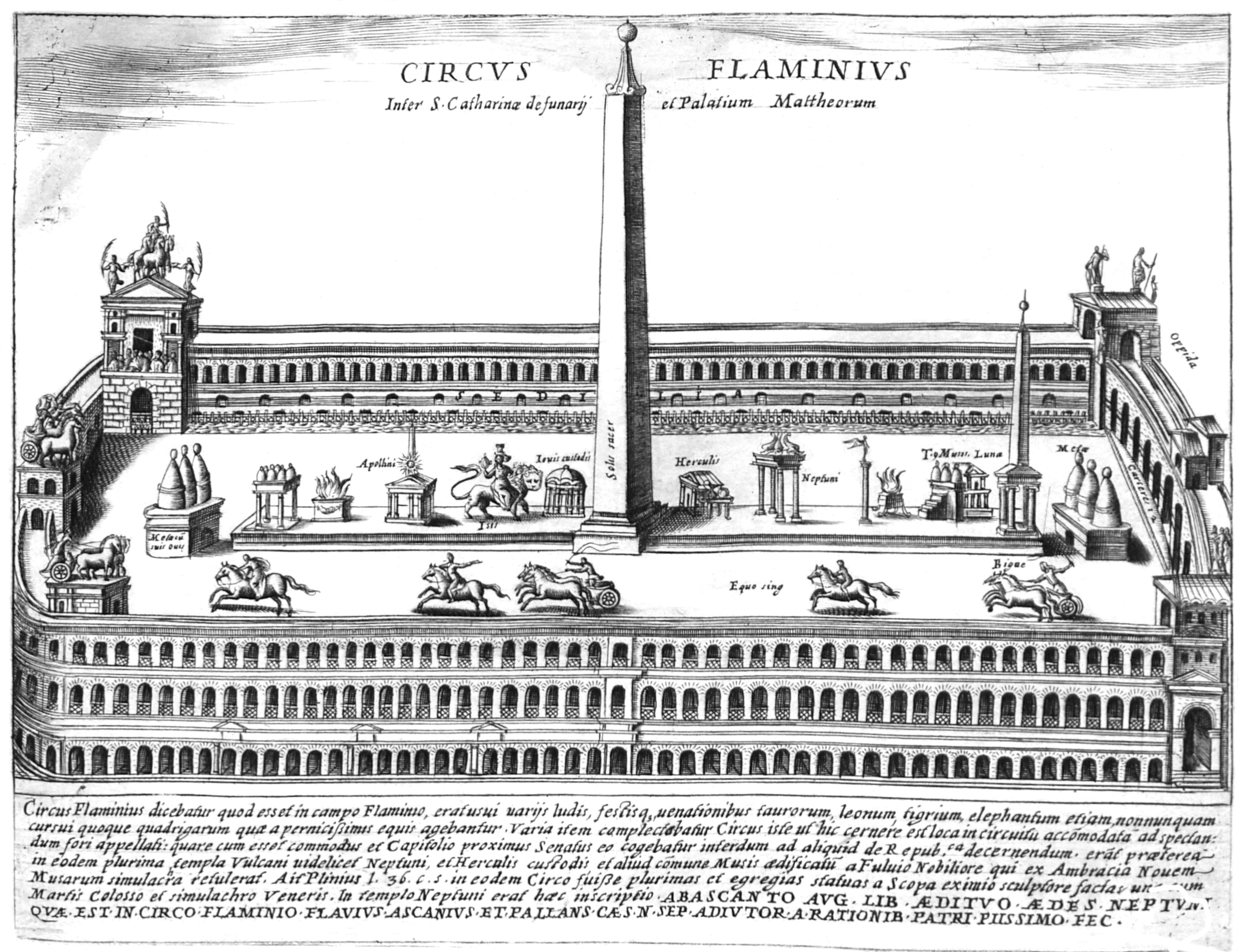
Circus Flaminus (a possible venue for the games)

The Plebeian Games (Latin Ludi Plebeii) were an ancient Roman religious festival held November 4–17. The games (ludi) included both theatrical performances (ludi scaenici) and athletic competitions for the purpose of entertaining the common people of Rome.

== History ==
The Plebeian Games may have been celebrated among the common people without an official place on the religious calendar until plebeians rose to positions of highest prominence; Cicero, at least, thought they were Rome's oldest ludi. They are known to have been held each year from 220 onward, but may have been much older. It may be most accurate to say the Ludi Plebeii were first established as a public festival in 220 BC. Because the proceedings of the Plebeian Games strikingly resemble those of the Ludi Romani ("Roman Games"), T.P. Wiseman has suggested that they were created by the plebs as an assertion of their own identity, perhaps as early as the 5th or 4th century BC.

== Purpose ==
The Ludi Plebeii were presented by the plebeian aediles and celebrated plebeian political liberty, but tradition varied as to freedom from what: either the tyranny of the Tarquins in the Regal period, or the dominance of the patricians, the hereditary ruling class of early Republican Rome (see "Conflict of the Orders").

== Timing and location ==
According to one ancient source, the games were held in the Circus Flaminius, which was associated with the common people of Rome (plebs). Nearly all other games were held in the Circus Maximus. The Circus Flaminius was built by the plebeian censor Gaius Flaminius in 220 BC, and the annual games may have been instituted by him that year. During the festival, a feast of Jupiter (Epulum Iovis) was held November 13, a cavalry parade November 14, and circus games (ludi circenses, mainly chariot races) November 15–17. The siting of the games at the Circus Flaminius may thus be an error, since the Circus Flaminius had no track for chariot racing. A procession similar to that of the Ludi Romani is likely also to have been part of the festivities.

== Miscellanea ==
Plautus first presented his comedy Stichus at the Plebeian Games of 200 BC.

Livy notes that the ludi had to be repeated three times in 216 BC, owing to a vitium (ritual fault) that disrupted the correct performance of events.

== See also ==
- Conflict of the Orders
