= Gaius Calpurnius Piso (praetor 211 BC) =

Gaius Calpurnius Piso was a Roman praetor and promagistrate.

== Biography ==
He was taken prisoner at Battle of Cannae and, with two others, was sent to Rome to negotiate the release of his fellow prisoners. However, the Senate refused to entertain the proposition. In 211 BC, he was made urban praetor and at the expiration of his year of office he made promagistrate of Etruria. In 209 BC, he was commanded by dictator Quintus Fulvius Flaccus to the command of an army at Capua. The following year he was once again entrusted as promagistrate of Etruria. While promagistrate he proposed to the Senate that the Apollinarian games be repeated on an annual basis.
