= Sellisternium =

The sellisternium or solisternium was a ritual banquet for goddesses in the Ancient Roman religion. It was based on a variant of the Greek theoxenias, and was considered an appropriately "greek" form of rite for some Roman goddesses thought to have been originally Greek, or with clearly Greek counterparts. In the traditional Roman lectisternium, the images of attending deities, usually male, reclined on couches along with their male hosts or guests. In the sellisternium, the attending goddesses sat on chairs or benches (in Latin, sellae), usually in the company of exclusively female hosts and guests. A sellisternium for the Magna Mater was part of her ludi Megalenses; a representation of her temple on the Augustan Ara Pietatis probably shows her sellisternum, which includes Attis, her castrated consort. After the Great Fire of Rome in 64 AD, a sellisternium was held to propitiate Juno. The secular games had a sellisternium for Juno and Diana, and according to Macrobius, a seated banquet of the gods and goddesses alike was part of Hercules' cult at the Ara Maxima.
