= Hercules of the Forum Boarium =

Ancient Roman bronze statue

- Capitoline Hercules
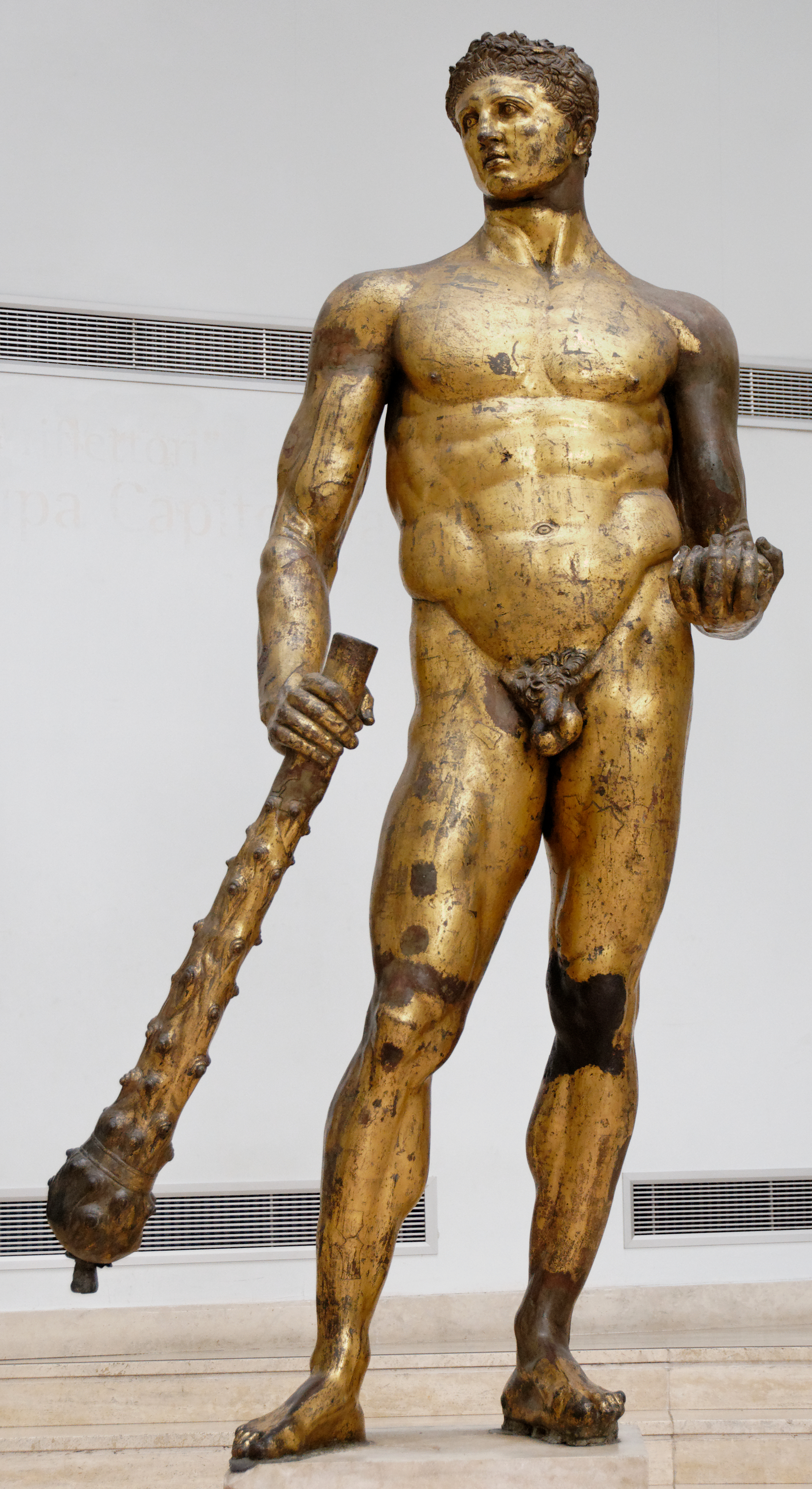
- Year: 2nd century BC
- Catalogue: MC 1265
- Medium: Bronze
- Dimensions: 383 cm (151 in)
- Location: Capitoline Museums, Rome

Hercules of the Forum Boarium is an ancient Roman gilded bronze statue depicting Hercules that was originally located near the Forum Boarium. In 1950 it was moved to the Palazzo dei Conservatori and remains on permanent display in the Capitoline Museums. The statue was likely to have been a cult image at the Temple of Hercules that stood by the ancient cattle market.

== Description ==
The bronze sculpture is larger than life-sized and is in the Hellenistic style of the second century BC. The Hellenistic style was based on the canon of proportions that had been established by Lysippos in the early fourth century BC. The muscles on the sculpture are exaggerated and the head is proportionally smaller when compared to the rest of the body. The Forum Boarium statue is one of the two surviving full-sized Greek statues from ancient Greece. The second Hercules statue was discovered near the Theatre of Pompey and is now in the Vatican Museums. The Hercules of the Theatre of Pompey had been carefully buried under protective tiles and incised FCS (Fulgor Conditum Summanium) because it was constantly hit by lightning. The Hercules of the Theatre of Pompey depicts him leaning on his club vertically as he holds the apple of Hesperides in his left hand. On his left forearm, he has draped the skin of the Nemean Lion that he defeated on his first Labor. Both sculptures display contrapposto, a style typical of Greek classicism in which most of the figure's weight rests on one foot. Although the muscles are exaggerated, they stand in marked contrast to the bearded, burly, and perhaps more familiar Farnese Hercules.

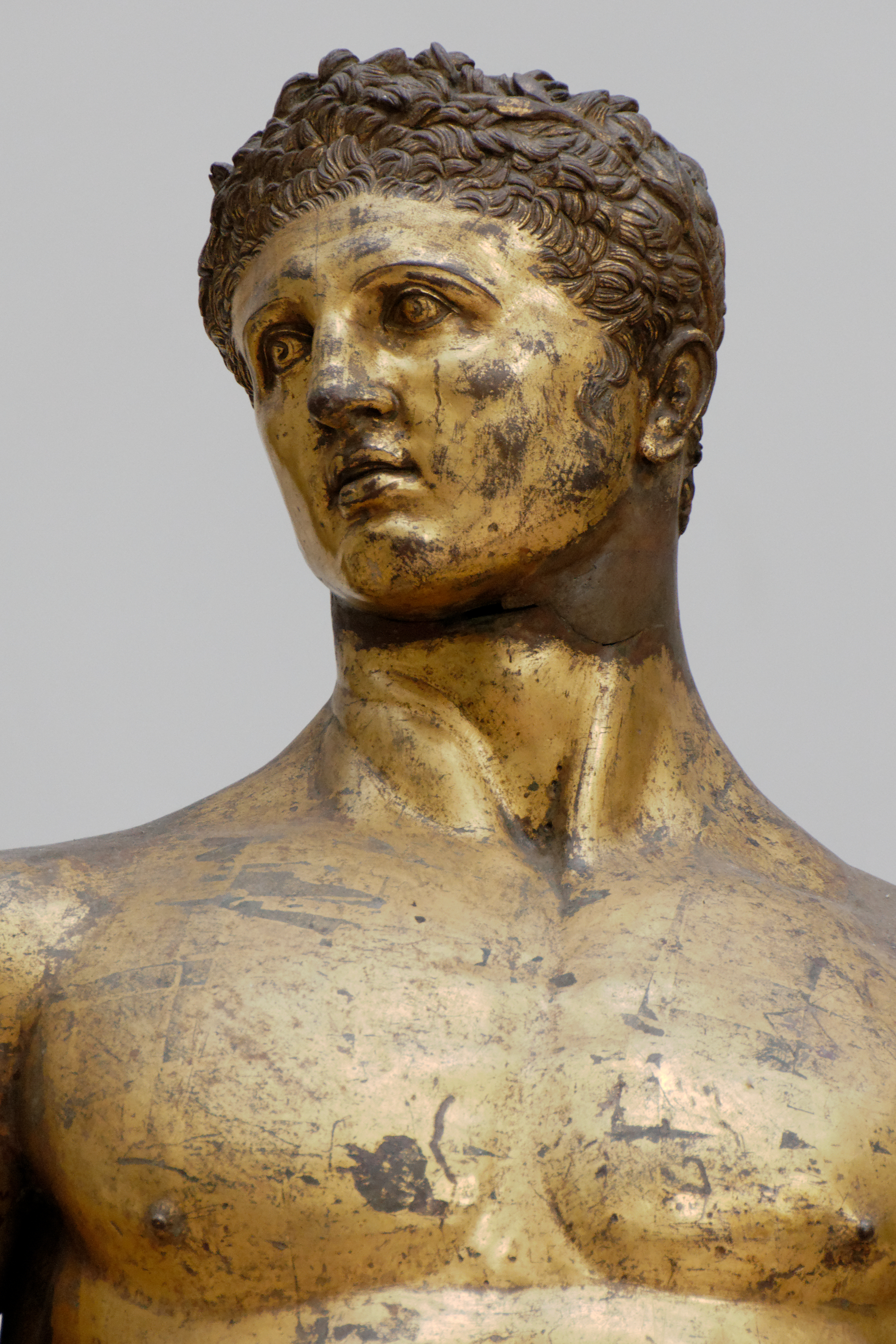
Detail of head

== Subject ==
The statue of Hercules from the Forum Boarium is based on one of his twelve labors, which required him to retrieve the Golden Apples of Hesperides and deliver them to Eurystheus. During his quest Hercules encountered the Titan Prometheus and freed him from his shackles. In return, Prometheus told him where he could find the Golden Apples. They were guarded by a hundred-headed dragon named Ladon who could not be conquered by Hercules. To defeat Ladon, he would need the help of Atlas, the Titan who held heaven and earth on his shoulders. Hercules managed to persuade Atlas to retrieve the Golden Apples for him, but in return Hercules had to agree to carry the weight of the world while Atlas completed the task. When Atlas returned with the apples, however, he was unwilling to retake the weight of the world. Hercules tricked him by saying that he would gladly stay and hold up the world forever, if only Atlas would take the weight again very briefly while Hercules adjusted his cloak. So Atlas resumed bearing the weight of the world, and Hercules grabbed the Golden Apples and ran off.

== History ==
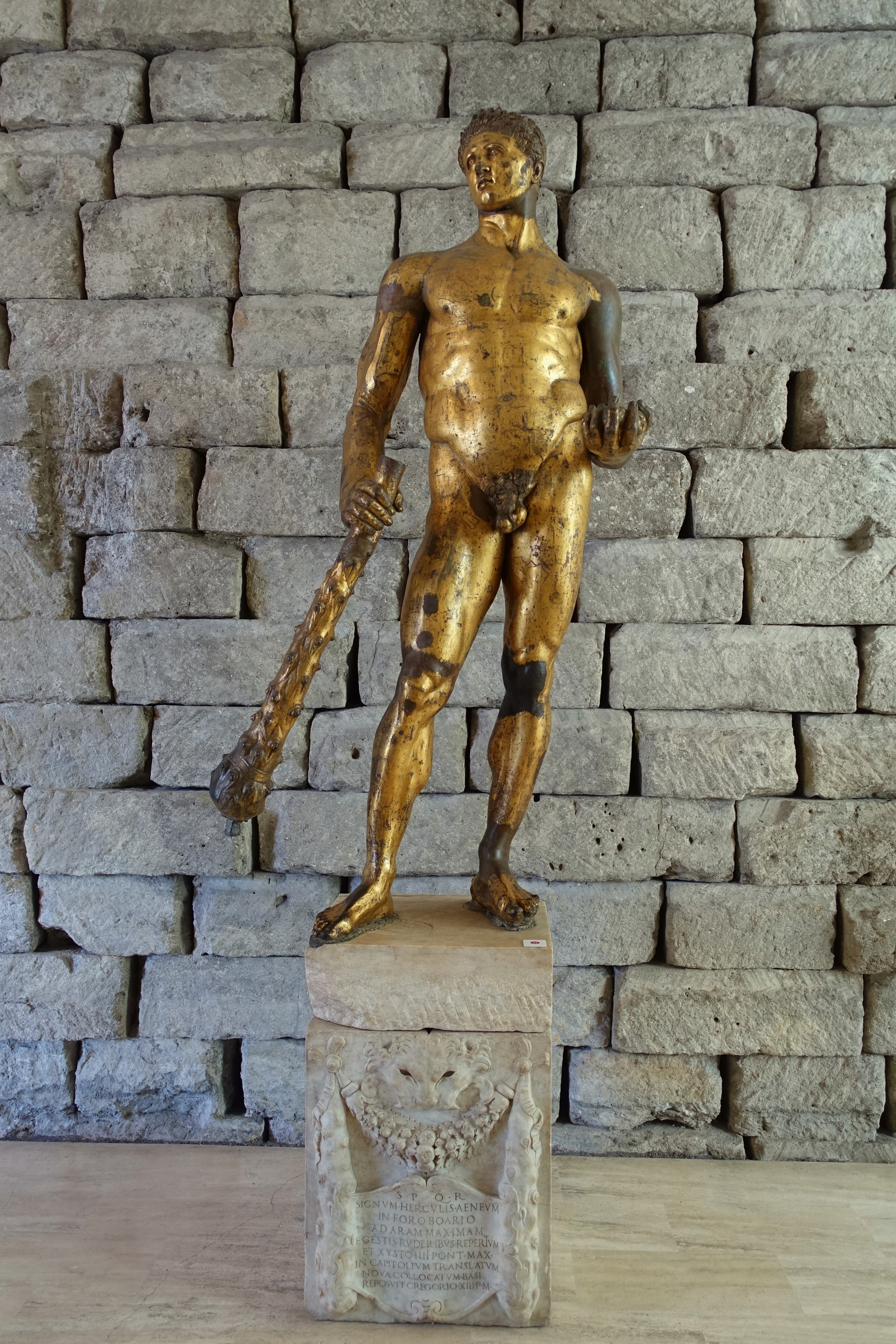
The statue is now displayed in front of the remains of the Temple of Jupiter Optimus Maximus, atop a commemorative base with inscription dating from the papacy of Pope Gregory XIII.

The temple of the Forum Boarium in Rome is located by the Tiber. The statue was first created for the cult of Ara Maxima, which was dedicated to Hercules by the Greek king Evander. Legend states that the statue was created to commemorate the story of Hercules killing the robber Cacus, who attempted to steal the cattle of Geryon. During the early Renaissance, the little that was left of the temple was demolished under the orders of Sixtus IV. The temple was converted into a church. This statue of Hercules was moved to the Palazzo dei Conservatori on the Campidoglio in 1510. The statue of Hercules Aemilianus is believed to have been commissioned by either Aemilius Paullus, who dedicated a tomb to Hercules, or by Scipio Aemilianus. The statue was found after Romans demolished a portion to create space for their new rotunda. There are two ancient temples where the statue may have been displayed: the temple located between Circus Maximus and the Church of Santa Maria and the temple of Hercules Ameliana. The statue of Hercules of the Theatre of Pompey, also known as the statue of Hercules Invictus, was discovered in 1864 near the Theatre of Pompey, and is known as the Hercules Mastai or Mastai Righetti. This is the gilded, bronze statue of Hercules that is now located in the Vatican Rotunda and is currently (2023) being restored.
