= Epulum Jovis =

Ritual feast offered to Jupiter

In ancient Roman religion, the Epulum Jovis (also Epulum Iovis) was a sumptuous ritual feast offered to Jupiter. Livy, a 1st-century BCE Roman historian, describes such a feast occurring during Plebeian games, which itself occurred during the month of November. The classicist John Scheid suggests that the ceremony probably also occurred after the Roman games in September, noting that such games were generally concluded with sacrificial rites.

Valerius Maximus—a 1st-century CE Roman author—describes one such "banquet of Jupiter" ("Jovis epulo") featuring the gods of the Capitoline Triad. Valerius writes that Jupiter—presumably referencing a statue of the god—rested upon a couch ("lectulum"), whereas Minerva and Juno sat upon nearby chairs ("sellas"). Another ancient Roman writer, Aulus Gellius, a 2nd-century CE Roman grammarian, records that the ceremony occurred at the Capitoline hill, and that the Senate partook in the banquet. According to the classicist John F. Donahue, the food was likely exclusively available to the Senate, as they were—according to the 1st-century CE historian Suetonius—granted the right to participate in public feasts. (Note: Donahue translates the Suetonian passage as referring to the "right of eating at public expense," whereas the Loeb Classical Library edition merely refers to the senators "taking part in the public banquets.") The Senators therefore would have been situated at the top of the Capitoline, above the forum, where the plebeians resided. Thus, according to the classicist Francisco Marco Simón, this aspect of the ceremony implicitly reinforced the distinctions between the different social classes of ancient Rome.

Cicero, a 1st-century BCE Roman statesman, writes that Numa had established the College of Pontiffs so as to manage the "sacrificial banquet of the games" ("ludorum epulare sacrificium"), perhaps in reference to the Epulum Jovis. Later, in 196 BCE, the new organization of the Epulones was established to assume control over the ritual. It is not clear whether the ritual was present in the most archaic layers of Roman religion; it may have been introduced later, due to the influence of the lectisternium. There are other comparable ritual feasts in Roman religion, such as the offering to Jupiter Dapalis described by the 2nd-century BCE politician Cato the Elder, though the presence of statues depicting the associated deities as the rituals is not necessarily an aspect of native Italic religion. The 1st-century BCE poet Ovid, for instance, describes a religious meal and a sacrifice for the god Vacuna, where it was believed that the gods were spiritually present at the table ("mensae credere adesse deos," "to believe that the gods were present at the table"). According to the historian of Roman religion William Warde Fowler, it is most likely that the ceremony—as it is known from Roman literature—was introduced from Etruria, probably by the specific Etruscan dynasty that built the Capitoline temple, though it perhaps merged with an earlier type of ritual feast.

== See also ==
- Lectisternium
- Sellisternium
- Religion in ancient Rome
- Glossary of ancient Roman religion
