= Lectisternium =

Ancient Roman propitiatory ceremony

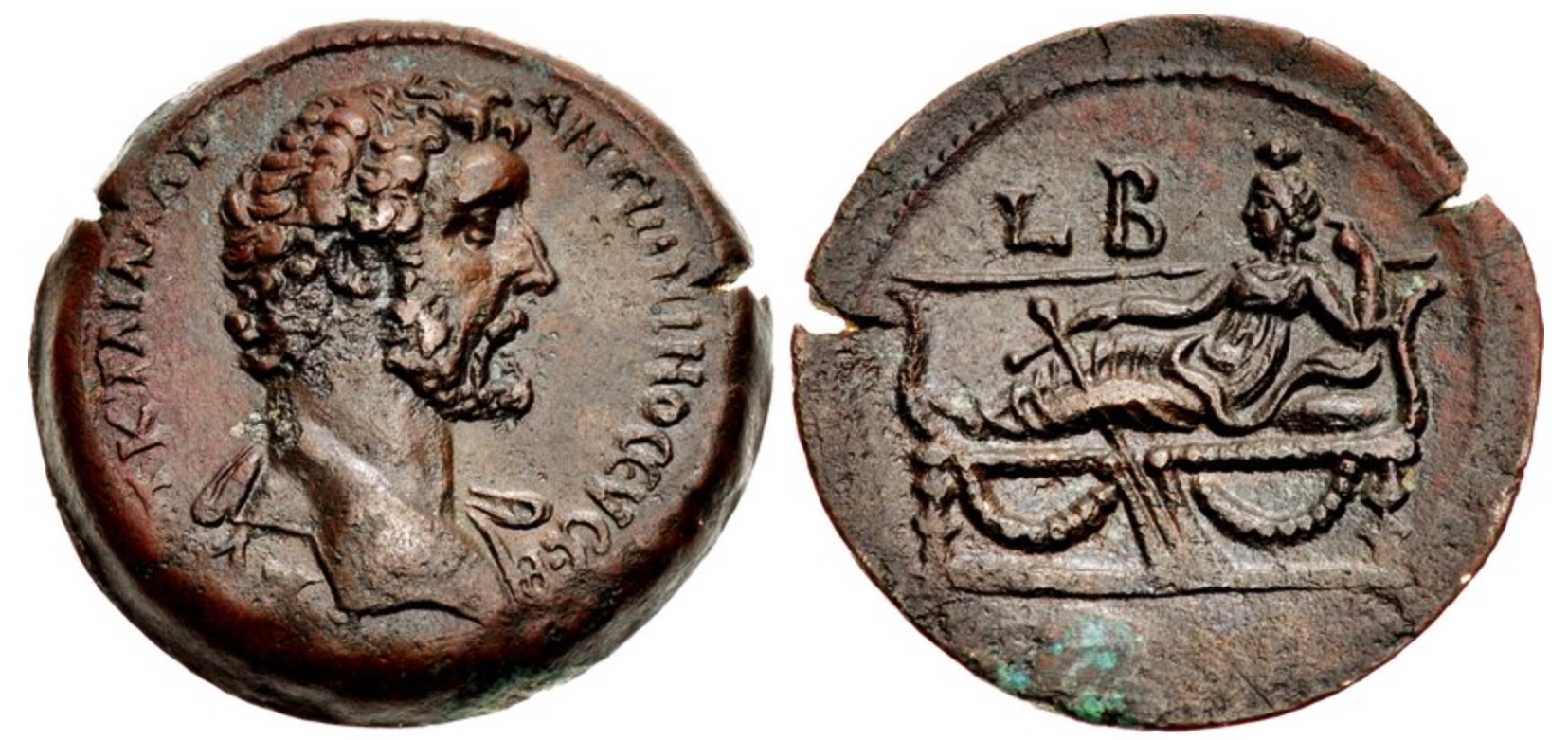
Egyptian Drachm of Antoninus Pius (dated year 2 of his reign or 139 AD) showing his portrait and Tyche holding a rudder while reclining on couch for lectisternium (35 mm, 25.45 g)

The lectisternium was an ancient Roman propitiatory ceremony, consisting of a meal offered to gods and goddesses. The word derives from lectum sternere, "to spread (or "drape") a couch." The deities were represented by their busts or statues, or by portable figures of wood, with heads of bronze, wax or marble. It has also been suggested that the divine images were bundles of sacred herbs tied together in the form of a head, covered by a waxen mask so as to resemble a kind of bust, rather like the straw figures called Argei. A couch (lectus) was prepared by draping it with fabric. The figures or sacred objects pertaining to the deity (such as the wreath awarded in a triumph) were laid upon it. Each couch held a pair of deities, sometimes male with female equivalent. If the image was anthropomorphic, the left arms were rested on a cushion (pulvinus) in the attitude of reclining to eat. The couches (pulvinar) were set out in the open street, or a temple forecourt, or in the case of ludi, in the pulvinar or viewing box, and a meal was served on a table before the couch.

== History ==
Livy says that the ceremony took place "for the first time" in Rome in the year 399 BC, after a pestilence had caused the Sibylline Books to be consulted by the duumviri sacris faciundis, the two (later 10, and later 15) priestly officials who maintained the archive. Three couches were prepared for three pairs of gods—Apollo and Latona, Hercules and Diana, Mercury and Neptune. The feast lasted for eight (or seven) days, and was also celebrated by private individuals. The citizens kept open house, quarrels were forgotten, debtors and prisoners were released, and everything done to banish sorrow.

Similar honors were paid to other divinities in subsequent times: Fortuna, Saturnus, Juno Regina of the Aventine, the three Capitoline deities (Jupiter, Juno, Minerva). In 217 BC, after the Roman defeat at Lake Trasimene, a lectisternium was held for three days to six pairs of gods, corresponding to the Twelve Olympians of ancient Greek religion: Jupiter, Juno, Neptune, Minerva, Mars, Venus, Apollo, Diana, Vulcan, Vesta, Mercury, Ceres.

In 205 BC, alarmed by unfavorable prodigies, the Romans were ordered to fetch the Great Mother of the gods from Pessinus in Phrygia; in the following year the image was brought to Rome, and a lectisternium held. In later times, the lectisternium became a constant or even daily occurrence, celebrated in the different temples. Occasionally the "Draping of Couches" was part of Roman Triumph celebrations. Aulus Hirtius reports that Julius Caesar was greeted with "draped dining couches" following his victory in Gaul, in anticipation of a forthcoming triumph. Such celebrations must be distinguished from those which were ordered, like the earlier lectisternia, by the Sibylline Books in special emergencies.

In the Imperial era, chairs were substituted for sofas in the case of goddesses, and the lectisternium in their case became a sellisternium. This was in accordance with Roman custom, since in the earliest times all the members of a family sat at meals, and in later times at least the women and children. This is a point of distinction between the original practice at the lectisternium and the epulum Jovis, the goddesses at the latter being provided with chairs, whereas in the lectisternium they reclined.

In Christian times the word was used for a feast in memory of the dead.

== Origins ==
Offerings of food were made to the gods in early Roman times on such occasions as the ceremony of confarreatio, and the epulum Jovis (often conflated with the lectisternium). The lectisternia, however, are likely of Greek origin. The Greek theoxenia (Θεοξένια) is similar, except that the gods played the part of host. The gods associated with it were either previously unknown to Roman religion, though often concealed under Roman names, or were provided with a new cult. Thus Hercules was not worshipped as at the Ara Maxima, where, according to Servius and Cornelius Balbus a lectisternium was forbidden. The Sibylline Books, which decided whether a lectisternium was to be held or not, were of Greek origin; the custom of reclining at meals was Greek.

Some, however, assign an Etruscan origin to the ceremony, the Sibylline Books themselves being looked upon as old Italian "black books." It may be that as the lectisternia became an almost everyday occurrence in Rome, people forgot their foreign origin and the circumstances in which they were first introduced, and then the word pulvinar with its associations was transferred to times in which it had no existence.

== Sources ==
- Taylor, Lily Ross. "The Sellisternium and the Theatrical Pompa." Classical Philology, vol. 30, no. 2, 1935, pp. 122–30. JSTOR, http://www.jstor.org/stable/263926. Accessed 9 Dec. 2022.
- Article by A. Bouché-Leclercq in Daremberg and Saglio, Dictionnaire des antiquités;
- Marquardt, Römische Staatsverwaltung, iii. 45, 187 (1885);
- G. Wissowa, Religion und Kultus der Römer, p. 355 seq.;
- Monograph by Wackermann (Hanau, 1888);
- C. Pascal, Studii di antichità e mitologia (1896).
