= Theoxenia (festival) =

Ancient Greek sacred feasts for gods and heroes

Theoxenia (Ancient Greek: θεοξένια; often ξένια; sometimes θεοδαίσια) were sacred feasts offered to gods or heroes, where the deities were treated as guests, or at times as hosts who invited mortals to dine. The Roman lectisternia were modeled on these Greek rites.

The Delphic Theoxenia was not the first of its kind. Early examples occur in Greek tradition, such as the banquet in Homer, where the twelve gods are entertained. Hesychius glosses Theoxenia as a “common feast of all the gods,” which may imply the twelve Olympians, though the scope was wider.

From very early times certain families or tribes honored specific gods or heroes with table-offerings on fixed occasions such as birthdays or moments of success and victory. This private observance is attested by Greek authors and by inscribed votive tablets. A Roman parallel is the story of the Potitii.

The term Xenia could denote both private and public theoxenia. From gentile cults arose public or civic celebrations, notably the Delphic Theoxenia, which gave its name to the month Theoxenios (March–April). The festival likely predated Apollo’s supremacy at Delphi, with Zeus first among the divine guests; in historical times Apollo and Latona were specially honored.

During these rites the gods were imagined to feast at multiple tables, singly or in pairs, each with a cushioned couch, the pulvinar. Unlike the Roman lectisternium, placing the statue on the couch was not required, though it sometimes occurred. Vase-paintings often indicate the deity’s presence symbolically. Athenaeus records that Delphians offered leeks to Latona, with a share of her table given to the bearer of the largest leek.

Pindar received a special invitation to Apollo’s table, proclaimed by the priest, an honor extended to his descendants. Delphian priests dined as ex officio human guests.

Apollo was not the most frequent recipient. Feasts were also held for Zeus Soter and Pluto at Athens, and often for deified heroes, especially the Dioscuri. Their cultic “hospitality” was widespread in Doric states and at Athens in the Prytaneion, and is reflected in inscriptions and reliefs. The motif linked the Twins with aid in battle, as in accounts where victors “entertain” them in thanks.

Dionysus was also commonly honored. At Andros the festival featured a miraculous outflow of wine from the temple, and his entertainments bore the special name Theodaisia (Θεοδαίσια), feast of the gods.

== Bibliography ==
- Smith, William, ed. (1875). "Theoxenia". Dictionary of Greek and Roman Antiquities (1st ed.). London: John Murray.
- Deneken, Karl (1881). De Theoxeniis: Dissertatio Philologica. Berlin: Typis Adolphi Kiepert. p. 14.
