= Pompa circensis =

Ancient Roman festival procession

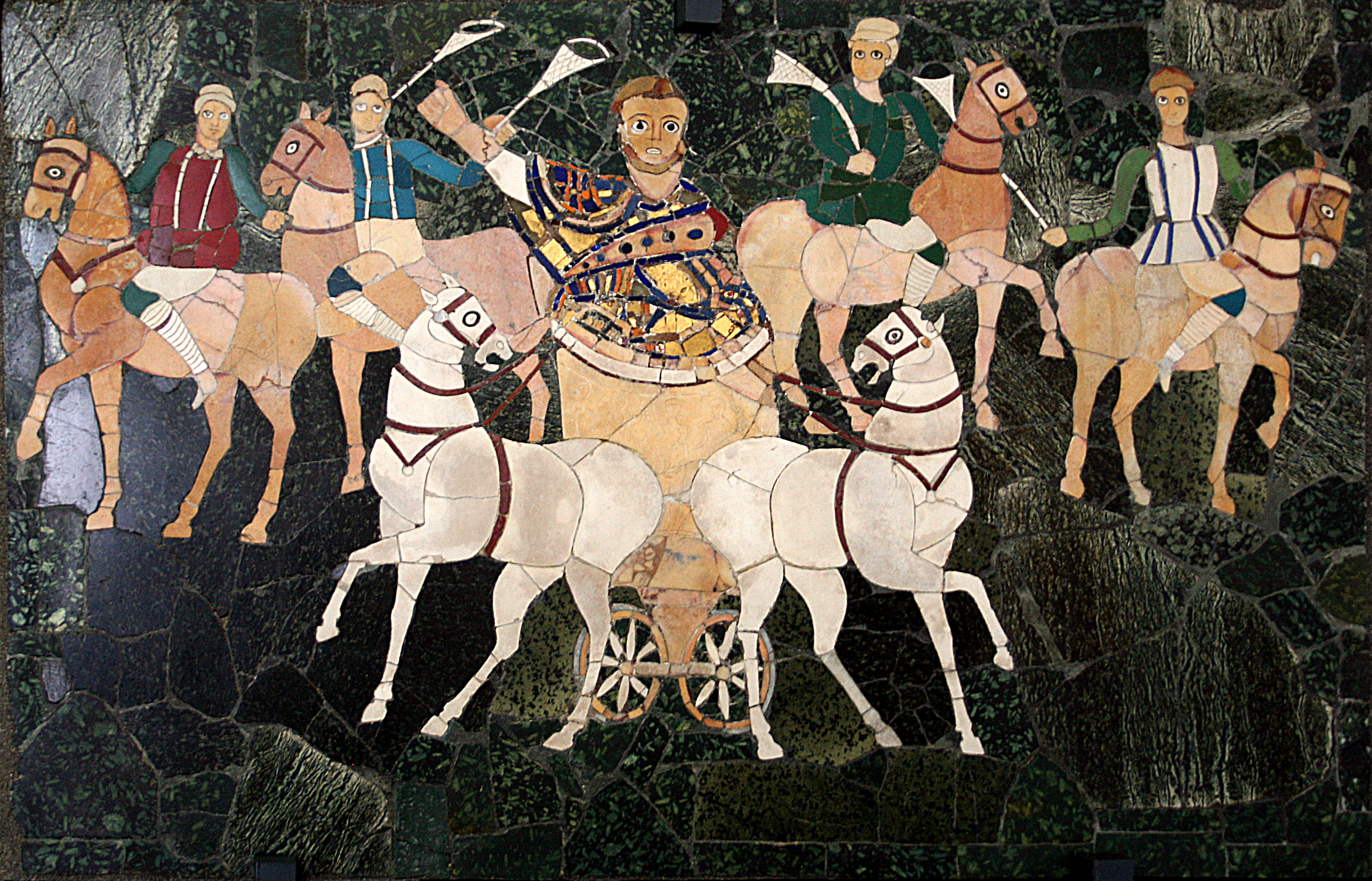
The presiding magistrate at the pompa circensis rode in a two-horse chariot; behind him are the young nobiles who led the parade on horseback (4th-century opus sectile from the Basilica of Junius Bassus)

In ancient Rome, the pompa circensis ("circus parade") was the procession that preceded the official games (ludi) held in the circus as part of religious festivals and other occasions.

== Description ==
The most detailed description of the pompa circensis during the Republican era is given by Dionysius of Halicarnassus, based on eyewitness observation and the historian Fabius Pictor, who says he is describing the original Ludi Romani; Fabius may, however, have been more influenced by what he saw in the pompa of the Saecular Games in 249 BC. The procession was led by boys of the nobility (nobiles) riding on horseback, followed by boys on foot who were future infantrymen. Next came the charioteers and athletes who would compete in the games.

Troupes of dancers followed to musical accompaniment performed on auloi, a type of woodwind instrument, and the lyre. The dancers were divided into age classes, men, youths, and children. Wearing purple tunics, they wielded swords and short spears in weapon dances similar to the Cretan pyrrhics. The adult dancers also wore bronze helmets with "conspicuous crests and wings."

A chorus dressed as satyrs and sileni followed the armed dancers and mocked them. They were costumed in woolly tunics, garlands of different kinds of flowers, and goatskin loincloths, with their hair standing out on their heads in tufts. The appearance of satyristai at the original Ludi Romani is the earliest known reference to satyrs in Roman culture. Although Dionysius suggests that both the weapon dances and the Bacchic dancing were in imitation of the Greeks, the weapon dances had a Roman precedent in the Salian priests, who danced with sword and shield, and the role of the satyrs seems based on Etruscan custom.

The procession concluded with men carrying golden bowls and perfumes, and then the statues of the gods carried on litters (fercula), with their attributes (exuviae) transported separately in special chariots or carts (tensae or thensae). The tensae were pulled by boys whose mothers and fathers were still alive. The images and exuviae were displayed at the circus, probably on the wooden platform called a pulvinar.

The procession started from the Capitolium, and through the clivus Capitolinus came to the Roman Forum. It then proceeded along the Via Sacra and passed through the Vicus Tuscus to arrive at the Circus Maximus.

The magistrate who presided over the games rode in a two-horse chariot (biga) and wore the traditional attire of the triumphing general (triumphator). It had been the view of Theodor Mommsen that the pompa circensis was simply a repurposing of the triumphal procession, to which the presenting of games had originally been attached. After ludi began to be presented apart from a triumph, the presiding magistrate took the place of the triumphator in the parade. H. S. Versnel considered the pompa to be a blend of Greek, Roman, and Etruscan elements. Frank Bernstein has argued that the tradition of Etruscan origin is essentially sound, and that the circus games and their opening procession were established during Rome's Regal period under the rule of Etruscan kings as part of the cult of the Capitoline Jupiter.

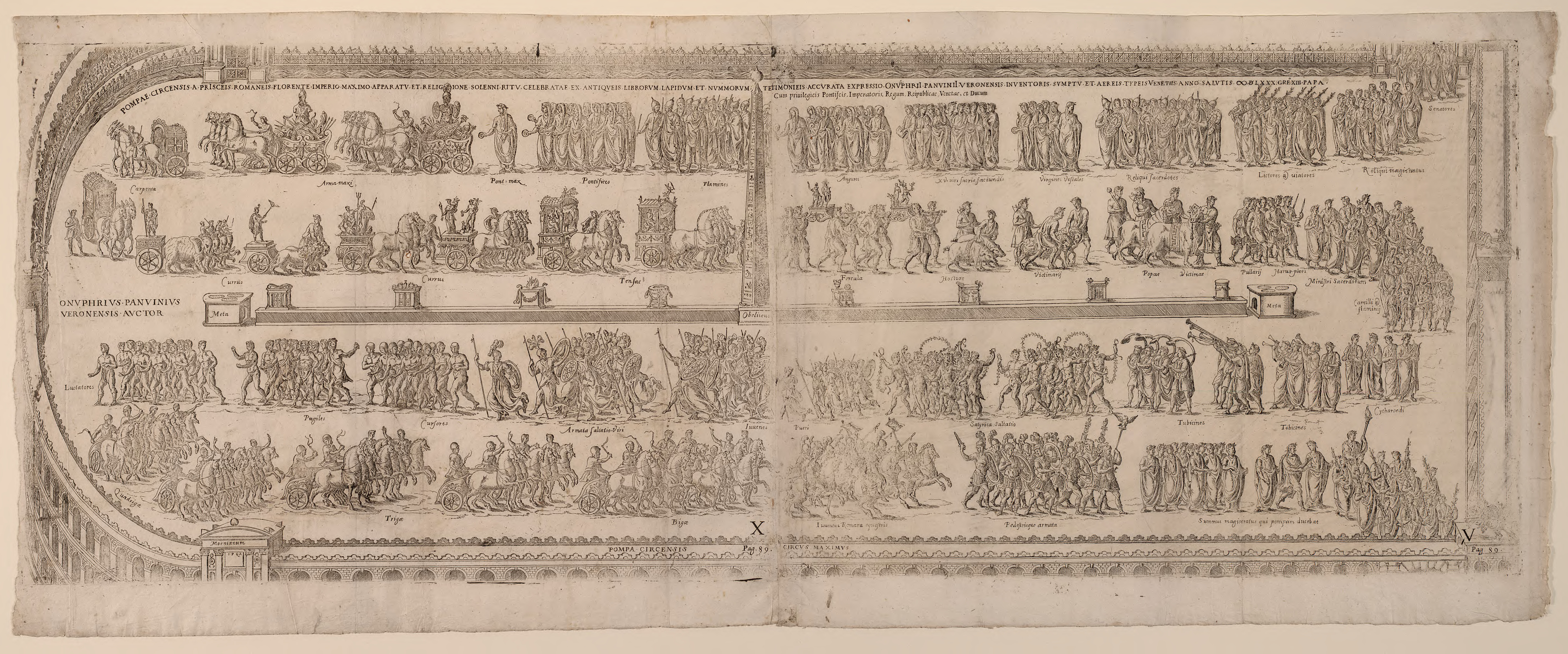
A late 16th-century etching, from a book by the antiquarian Onofrio Panvinio published posthumously, reimagining the pompa circensis within the Circus Maximus but conflating it with a triumphal procession, labeling the elements of the parade in Latin

== During the Empire ==
The pompa circensis underwent a significant change during the dictatorship of Julius Caesar, when his image and chariot were added to the procession. During the reigns of Augustus and Tiberius, other members of the imperial family were represented by images and sellae (special "seats" or thrones; see curule chair). It then became customary in the 1st century to have the images of the emperor's family join those of the deities. By the time of Tiberius, the parade route had incorporated the Temple of Mars Ultor, built by Augustus, which had absorbed several ceremonies formerly held at the Temple of Capitoline Jupiter. The new extended route would have passed along the Forum of Augustus.

The priesthood of the Arval Brothers carried out a sacrifice when these ludi circenses were held in conjunction with various celebrations of Imperial cult. Until the reign of Nero, the Arval sacrifices were made on the Capitolium, where the procession traditionally began. In the early Empire, however, the Arvals made their sacrifices at the new Temple of the Divine Augustus on the occasion of ludi Martiales, ludi Augustales, and Augustus's birthday. At these times, the procession began there. The topography covered by the parade route might vary according to the desired symbolism for the occasion.

A more traditional parade route was restored under the Flavian dynasty. The Capitolium was again the focus, and the temples most explicitly connected to the Julio-Claudians were less central, though the images of the imperial family continued to be displayed. The route was expanded to pass along the Campus Martius in the time of Domitian, who had built a grand temple to the divinized Vespasian and Titus there. During the 2nd century, the route of the pompa circensis had probably become more similar to that of the triumph. The pompa circensis thus developed as a highly visible medium for expressing the new political and religious order of the Empire.
