= Temple of Jupiter Stator =

The Temple of Jupiter Stator can refer to three temples in ancient city of Rome:

- Temple of Jupiter Stator (3rd century BC)
- Temple of Jupiter Stator (2nd century BC)
- Temple of Jupiter Stator (Flavian Period), most likely situated where now stand the remains of the Temple of Romulus
