= Servian constitution =

Legal code of ancient Rome

The Servian constitution was one of the earliest forms of military and political organization used during The Roman Republic. Most of the reforms extended voting rights to certain groups, in particular to Rome's citizen-commoners (collectively, the plebeians) who were minor landholders or otherwise landless citizens hitherto disqualified from voting by ancestry, status or ethnicity, as distinguished from the hereditary patricians. The reforms thus redefined the fiscal and military obligations of all Roman citizens. The constitution introduced two elements into the Roman system of government: a census of every male citizen, in order to establish his wealth, tax liabilities, military obligation, and the weight of his vote; and the comitia centuriata, an assembly with electoral, legislative and judicial powers. Both institutions were foundational for Roman republicanism.

The Servian constitution is traditionally attributed to the sixth king of Rome, Servius Tullius (578–534 BC), though scholars now believe that the wholesale attribution of these measures to Servius "cannot be taken at face value". The constitution likely represents a long-drawn, complex and piecemeal process extending from Servius' predecessors, former kings Ancus Marcius and Tarquinius Priscus, to his successor Tarquinius Superbus, into the Middle and Late Republic.

Rome's military and territorial expansion and the consequent changes in its population made franchise regulation and reform an ongoing necessity. By entrusting the military defense of the state to all citizens, the Servian reform created interdependency among the social classes. In its organization of voting tribes, it inextricably allied political and military life and opened up a "political space" for republican participation. To the Augustan historian Livy, the military service rendered by plebeians was thus a form of public service on a par with patrician duty in the Roman Senate. Even so, census rank depended on property value, and under the Servian constitution no citizen assessed at a worth of less than 11,000 asses (or 12,500, depending on the source) was admitted to the regular army.

== Curiate reform and census ==
Until the Servian reforms, the passing of laws and judgment was the prerogative of the comitia curiata (curiate assembly), made up from thirty curiae; Roman sources describe ten curiae for each of the three aristocratic tribes, the Ramnes, the Tities, and the Luceres, each claiming patrician status and privilege to election as magistrates by virtue of their descent from Rome's founding families. These tribes, supposedly based on three of Rome's hills, comprised approximately 200 gentes (clans), each of which contributed one senator ("elder") to the Senate. The senate advised the king, devised laws in his name, and was held to represent the entire populus Romanus (Roman people); but it could only debate and discuss. Its decisions had no force unless approved by the comitia curiata. By the time of Servius, if not long before, the tribes of the comitia were a minority of the population. Rome's far more populous citizen-commoners (plebeians) could participate in this assembly in limited fashion, and perhaps offer their opinions on decisions but only the comitia curiata could vote. An aristocratic minority thus exercised power and control over the commoner majority.

Roman tradition held that Servius formed a comitia centuriata of commoners, elected by the citizens as a whole, to augment or displace the comitia curiata as Rome's central legislative body. This required his development of the first Roman census, making Servius the first Roman censor. The census was organised on military lines; citizens assembled by tribe in the Campus Martius, to register their social rank, household, property and income. This established an individual's tax obligations; his capacity to muster arms at his own expense, when required to do so by the citizen's obligation to give military service; and his assignment to a particular voting bloc in elections and law-making.

The institution of the census and the comitia centuriata are speculated as Servius' attempt to erode the civil and military power of the Roman aristocracy, and seek the direct support of his newly enfranchised citizenry in civil matters; if necessary, under arms. The comitia curiata continued to function through the Regal and Republican eras, but the Servian reform had reduced its powers to those of a largely symbolic "upper house" whose noble members were expected to do no more than ratify decisions of the comitia centuriata.

=== Classes and army ===
The census classified Rome's male citizen population according to status, wealth and age. The classes were subdivided into groups called centuriae (centuries), nominally of 100 men (Latin centum = 100) but in practice of variable number, further divided into seniores (men aged 46 – 60, of a suitable age to serve as, reserves, "home guards" or city police) and iuniores (men aged 17 – 45, to serve as front-line troops when required). Adult male citizens were obliged, when called upon, to fulfill military service according to their means, which was supposedly assessed by as, a monetary unit that in the archaic period represented a particular weight of bronze or copper. This evaluated wealth of a citizen was based primarily on land ownership (jugera) and head of livestock (pecunia) until the introduction of a monetary system in the 2nd century BC. A citizen's wealth and class would therefore have defined their position in the civil hierarchies, and up to a point, within the military; but despite its apparent military character, and its possible origins as the mustering of the citizenry-at-arms, the system would have primarily served to determine the voting qualifications and wealth of individual citizens for taxation purposes, and the weight of their vote. Wars were occasional but taxation was a constant necessity; and the comitia centuriata met whenever required to do so, in peace or war. In effect, the comitia centuriata was the representative assembly, in a civil and political context, of Rome's citizenry-at-arms. Though each century had voting rights, the wealthiest had the most centuries, and voted first, and those beneath them were convened only in the event of deadlock or indecision. The lowest were unlikely to vote at all and was in large exempted from military service.

The centuriate classes were as follows:

- 1st class, with 100,000 in asses, infantry self-equipped with helmet, breastplate, greaves, round shield, spear and sword, comprising 40 centuries of seniores, and 40 of iuniores.
- 2nd class, with 75,000 in asses, infantry self-equipped with helmet, greaves, oblong shield, spear and sword, comprising 10 centuries of seniores and 10 of iuniores.
- 3rd class: 50,000 in asses, infantry self-equipped with helmet, oblong shield, spear and sword, comprising 10 centuries of seniores and 10 of iuniores.
- 4th class: 25,000 in asses, infantry self-equipped with oblong shield, spear, javelin, and sword comprising 10 centuries of seniores and 10 of iuniores.
- 5th class: 11,000 asses (12,500 in Dionysius), infantry self-equipped with sling and sling-stones (and javelin, in Dionysius), comprising 15 centuries of seniores and 15 of iuniores.
- Supernumaries: Proletarii (Capite censi, poor citizens, with no estate), 1 century. Military specialists: Equites (cavalry); 18 centuries (6 seniores, 12 iuniores). Engineers; 2 centuries. Musicians; 2 centuries.

Cornell suggests that the voting order of the equites (after infantry of the first class) reflects their subordination to the relatively low-status infantry in the centuriate system, but takes the view that equites in the archaic period "consisted mainly, if not exclusively, of patricians". Rosenstein distinguishes the "smaller, select group of 1,800 whose horses were furnished at public expense (equites equo publico)" from the majority of equites, who were wealthy enough to maintain and equip their own horse (equites equis suis).

The Servian reforms established both the Roman army's centuria system and its order of battle; men picked from civilian centuriae were slipped into military ones, and each battle line in the phalanx formation was composed of a single class. In the early Republican era, as during the Regal era, the highest officers of the army were drawn from the same social stratum as the aristocratic comitia curiata. Even after the institution of the comitia centuriata, the most immediate and effective plebeian defense against aristocratic power was the actual or threatened withdrawal of labour, including military service. The first known plebeian officers (tribunes) were elected by the plebs from among their own number after the secession of 494 BC.

=== New tribal division and expansion of the city ===
The reformation of the tribal divisions increased the city's sacred boundary (the pomerium) to include Rome's seven hills and their inhabitants. Some form of defence was constructed to protect the enlarged city, later reinforced by a wall, and the enclosed area was divided into four new administrative regiones (regions, or quarters); the Suburana, Collina, Palatina, and the Esquilana, where Servius himself is said to have taken a new residence. The situation beyond the walls is unclear: similar tribal areas, perhaps known as pagi, may have extended into the surrounding Roman territories (the ancient ager Romanus), and some of their inhabitants would have qualified for citizenship under the Servian class reforms. Either way, membership of a Roman voting-tribe depended thereafter on residence, rather than ancestry and inheritance. This would have brought significant numbers of urban and rural plebs into active political life; and a number of these would have been allocated to centuries of the first class, the most likely to vote. Dionysius of Halicarnassus, writing in the late first century BC, adds that the tribal divisions were where citizens paid their taxes. The city's division into "quarters" remained in use until 7 BC, when Augustus divided the city, by now much more densely populated, into 14 new regiones.

== See also ==
- Conflict of the Orders
