= Ludi Romani =

Ancient Roman religious festival

Roman Games (Ludi Romani)
- Observed by: Roman Republic, Roman Empire
- Type: Classical Roman religion
- Date: September 4–19
- Related to: the god Jupiter

The Ludi Romani (Latin for "Roman Games"; see ludi) were a religious festival in ancient Rome held annually, starting in 366 BC, from September 12 to September 14. In the 1st century BC, an extra day was added in honor of the deified Julius Caesar on 4 September and extended to September 19. The festival first introduced drama to Rome based on Greek models.

== Origins ==
These games—the chief Roman festival—were held in honor of Jupiter, and are said to have been established by Tarquinius Priscus on the occasion of his conquest of the Latin town of Apiolae. However, Dionysius of Halicarnassus and Cicero date them to the Roman victory over the Latins at Lake Regillus during the early Republic, ca. 496 BC.

The games were originally organized by the consuls and later by the curule aediles. At first they lasted only a day. A second day was added on the expulsion of the kings in 509 BC, and a third after the first secession of the plebs in 494 BC. From 191 to 171 BC they lasted ten days, and shortly before Caesar's death they apparently lasted fifteen days, from September 5 to 19. After Caesar's death a day was added. This day must have been September 4, because Cicero says in "Against Verres" that there were 45 days from the Ludi Romani to the Ludi Victoriae Sullanae on October 26. Thus, when this speech was composed in 70 BC, September 19 was already the last day of the Ludi Romani.

In calendars of the Augustan era, the days of the games are noted as September 4 to September 19. The Epulum Jovis was celebrated on the 13th and the Equorum probatio (a cavalry revue) on the 14th. Circus games lasted from the 15th to the 19th. In the Calendar of Philocalus (354 AD) they run from September 12 to 15.

== When and why ==
These games were not necessarily held every year from their inception. In many cases, games were based on a vow (votum) by a military commander, and were celebrated as a special festival after his triumphal procession. As the army used to go forth as a general rule each summer, it became customary when it returned in autumn to celebrate such games, though connected with no triumph, and though no signal victory had been gained. But still in all cases they were celebrated as extraordinary games, and not as games regularly established by law. They were sollemnes, "customary," but had not yet become annui, "yearly". Livy identifies the two kinds, the ludi magni and the ludi Romani, and so do Cicero (Repub. ii. 20, 35), Festus (l. c), and Pseudo-Asconius. In all his other books, however, Livy observes a distinction which has been pointed out by Friedrich Wilhelm Ritschl (Parerga zu Plautus, &c. p. 290), that ludi magni is the term applied to extraordinary games originating in a vow (ludi votivi), while ludi Romani is that applied to the games when they were established as annual (ludi stati). Ludi Romani is first used by Livy in viii. 40, 2 (see Weissenborn ad loc); and after that the terms varied according as the games are stati (e.g. x. 47, 7; xxv. 2, 8) or votivi. The distinction drawn by Ritschl is to be considered proven, but it is unclear when the "established" games became annual.

Most probably, says Mommsen, the games became annual when the first curule aediles were appointed in 367 BC, as these officials – distinct from the existing plebeian aediles – were described as curatores ludorum sollemnium. In the oldest Roman calendars, which likely date from the time of the Decemvirs in 450-449 BC (cf. Mommsen, Die römische Chronologie, &c. p. 30), these festivals are engraved in small letters rather than capitals, so they must be additions made after that time. Also, in 322 BC, the ludi Romani are mentioned as a regular annual festival, so they must have become established by then. Therefore, the most reasonable date for their institution is 367 BC, when many changes in government and society were effected, including the addition of one day to the games and the appointment of curule aediles to superintend them.

== Facts of Ludi Romani ==
Yet Livy and the other authors who identify the ludi magni and Romani are not altogether in error: for the arrangement of the two kinds of games was similar. An incidental proof of this is that when Gnaeus Pompeius Magnus ludi votivi in 70 BC, they lasted 15 days (Cicero In Verrem i. 1. 0, 31), like the ludi Romani; and we find similar sums, viz. 200,000 asses, bestowed for both ludi magni and ludi Romani. The actual ludi Romani consisted of first a solemn procession (pompa), then a chariot race in which each chariot in Homeric fashion carried a driver and a warrior, the latter at the end of the race leaping out and running on foot (Dionysius of Halicarnassus, Roman Antiquities vii. 72; and cf. Orelli, 2593, where a charioteer is spoken of as pedibus ad quadrigam). This is a practice confined to the ludi Romani. In the exhibitions of riding, each rider had a second horse led by the hand (Festus, s. v. Paribus Equis), as it appears the Roman horsemen in early times often used two horses in battle, like the Tarentini in Greek warfare (Livy xxxv. 28, 8). Such riders were called desultores.

Most likely, originally there was only one contest of each kind, and only two competitors in each contest (Liv. xliv. 9, 4), since at all periods in the Roman chariot-race only as many chariots competed as there were so-called factions, which were originally only two, the white and the red (Mommsen, Roman History i. 236, note). These few events allowed further minor exhibitions, such as boxers, dancers, competition in youthful horsemanship (ludus Trojae). It was allowed that the wreath the victor won (for this in Greek style was the prize of victory) should be put on his bier when dead (Twelve Tables, 10, 7, and Mommsen's remarks, Staatsrecht, i.2 411, note 2). Also, during the festival the successful warrior in real warfare (as opposed to imaginary warfare) wore the spoils he had won from the enemy, and was crowned with a chaplet.

After the introduction of the drama in 364, plays were acted at the ludi Romani, and in 214 BC we know that ludi scenici took up four days of the festival (Liv. xxiv. 43, 7). In 161 BC the Phormio of Terence was acted at these games.

== History of scholarship ==
The classic work on the Ludi Romani is Mommsen's article "Die Ludi Magni und Romani" in his Römische Forschungen, ii. 42-57 = Rheinisches Museum, xiv. 79–87; see also his Roman History, i. 235-237 (where the Greek influences on the Roman games are traced), 472, 473; and Friedländer in Marquardt's Staatsverwaltung, iii. 477, 478.
