= Olloudius =

Celtic god equated to Mars

Olloudios, latinized as Olludius, is a Celtic epithet reconstructed from three Latin inscriptions (Note: The three are: Corpus Inscriptionum Latinarum VII 73 (RIB 131), Marti Olludio; CIL XII 166 (Dessau 4580), Vigilia Metia Massae filia Marti Olloudio VSLM; CIL XII 167 (ILN II 81), reconstructed as [Marti Ol]loudio.) presumed to equate a Celtic god with Mars, the Roman god of war. One of these inscriptions was found at the village of Bisley, Gloucestershire, in the Cotswolds, England, and is no longer legible. The earlier two, from the former Greek Massalian colony of Antipolis (Antibes) on the Mediterranean coast of present-day France, the southernmost region of ancient Gaul, have been lost.

Like some of the other instantiations of Mars with a Celtic epithet in Roman Britain and Gaul, Olloudios would belong to class of Celtic deities who are invoked as protectors and promoters of wellbeing.

== Inscriptions ==
The name Olloudios was first detected in a Latin inscription of southern Gaul, in a dedication "to Mars Olloudios" (Marti Olloudio, dat.) made by a Roman woman named Vigilia Metia, daughter of Massa, in fulfillment of a vow.

VIGILIA METIA
MASSAE FILIA
MARTI OLLOVDIO
V S L M

The votum appeared on a bronze tablet (lamella) found in an urn at Antipolis (Antibes, in the French department of Alpes-Maritimes), a Massalian colonial foundation within the territory of the Ligurian Deciates, with the distinction between Celtic and Ligurian in this region often permeable. It was first published in 1685 by Jacob Spon. When Edmond Blanc was compiling ancient inscriptions from the Alpes-Maritimes for publication in 1878, he was unable to locate the original bronze tablet, believed it to have been lost, and instead worked from a copy.

The overall syntax of the inscription is clear, albeit with a few difficulties of individual words. The most slender of these is the suggestion of Auguste Allmer that since a line break need not represent a space between words, Vigilia was rather the daughter of a Metiamassa; the Roman gens Metia had connections to Gaul dating no later than the time of Julius Caesar.

More pointedly, an alternative reading of the god's name as OLLOVBO rather than OLLOVDIO emerged as early as 1726, when Joseph Anthelmy, who had seen the tablet, published the inscription (posthumously) as a correction of Spon's original reading. Blanc adopted the reading OLLOVBO as a toponymic surname, pointing to loub as a common element in place names around Mandelieu-la-Napoule and the Massif de l'Esterel, a reading shared by Otto Hirschfeld in publishing the 12th volume of Corpus Inscriptionum Latinarum (1888), inscriptions from Gallia Narbonensis. In his book series on ancient Provence in the 1970s and 80s, Jean-Paul Clébert accepted the name as toponymic and associated it with Ollioules, about 115 km to the southwest of Antibes in the Var, as did Miranda Green in the 1990s, both nonetheless retaining the spelling Olloudius.

André Chastagnol, editor of the Antibes volume of Inscriptiones Latines de Narbonnaise (1992), the CNRS series republishing the inscriptions of southern Gaul in light of modern epigraphical methodologies, accepted the reading MARTI OLLOVDIO (Note: ILN II.53) and located the god's cult site at Mont-Saint-Cassien.

=== Vallauris inscription ===
A second inscription of southern Gaul appeared on a rough-hewn stone block found on the east side of the local château's gardens in Vallauris, a suburb of Antibes. Hirschfeld notes that, as with the quest to locate Vigilia's votum, "in vain did Blanc seek it there". (Note: Frustra ibi quaesivit Blanc)

One of the most legible words (Valeri[---]) may refer to a donor named as one of the Valerii, who are common in southern Gaul from the early 1st century BC. (Note: Syme lists Valerii among those bearing one of the "common and indistinctive nomina" (gens names) in southern Gaul, owing to grants of citizenship by Roman proconsuls; Ronald Syme, "More Narbonensian Senators", Zeitschrift für Papyrologie und Epigraphik 65 (1986), p. 3, with further citations in n. 14.) Owing to the missing word ending, the gender of the dedicand is indeterminable.

Along with geographical proximity, the desire to collate evidence for a recurring Celtic god Olloudios seems to have influenced the reconstruction of this inscription (-loudio) by expanding the illegible portion as [Marti Ol]loudio – a conjecture reflected in the pertinent entry in Pauly-Wissowa's Real-Encyclopädie but regarded by Chastagnol in the 1990s as "dicey". Attested names such as Velloudius, from Nîmes, also in the southern Gallic province, and from Vence near Antibes, also show -loudios as the ending of a proper name.

=== Gloucestershire inscription ===
The one extant image labelled as Mars Olludius comes from a pair of reliefs discovered together in 1799 or shortly after, within the ancient territory of the Celtic Dobunni, between Bisley and Painswick in a place called Custom Scrubs. They may date to the 2nd or 3rd century. In 1906, Welbore St Clair Baddeley described this findspot as

a stone quarry that had eaten into the side of a steep tongue of land which there ends (overlooking and commanding one of the most beautiful scenes in Gloucestershire, the head and body of the Slad Valley) in a grassy platform, still called "Roman Tump".

Baddeley mused that the site would have been a fine location for a Romano-British temple or earlier sanctuary.

The two stone votives were made from regional fine-grained oolite (limestone) — Baddeley reckons from Bath and not the more local lias — and are about the same size: 15" wide, 5" thick, differing slightly in height, with the Olludius stone two inches taller than its 18" companion (overall, 38.1 × 50.8 × 12.7 cm). They were first described in 1817 when they were published as detailed engravings in the second volume of Samuel Lysons' Reliquiae Britannico-Romanae. The Olludius inscription is not discernible in Lysons' engravings, which do attempt to reproduce the accompanying relief's inscription, albeit with some uncertainty in the reading. Baddeley notes that "some other person read" the Marti Olludio inscription on the stone, not Lysons. In his history of Gloucestershire published in 1807, T. D. Fosbrooke mentions having seen Lysons' earlier drawings and without further description takes note of "a votive bas-relief, with the inscription, Marti Olludio, and other Roman antiques, of coarse work and little rarity, which are now preserved at the manor-house."

The antiquities found at the "adjacent hamlet" of Custom Scrubs were in the possession of Sir Paul Baghott at the manor house of Lypiatt soon after their discovery (Baghott was bankrupt by 1819, and the manor was sold in 1824). By 1845, the antiquities had been acquired by Thomas Baker and transferred to Watercombe House in Bisley, then owned by him. In 1846, the Archaelogical Institute of Great Britain and Ireland published an article on the ongoing excavations of Roman antiquities around Watercombe House, as well as Baker's acquistion of the Custom Scrubs finds, (Note: Thomas Baker is credited as the author of the article, though awkwardly referred to in third rather than first person throughout.) noting in particular the Olludius votive relief, with Fosbrooke cited as the source for the inscription MARTI OLLUDIO.

Around this time, the votive tablets were architecturally repurposed by Baker for a summerhouse on the grounds of Watercombe House, constructed largely with excavated materials, including several stamped hypocaust tiles, thought to come from a Roman villa nearby. As described by Baddeley sixty years later, Baker had the reliefs

set … into the south wall thereof, at about seven feet above the ground. At that time, or perhaps before it, they suffered grave indignities. The carved edges had been shaved down as if to fit them to the surface of a wall, and they had been painted all over with black. The paint has since worn off.

The British volume of Corpus Inscriptionum Latinarum, published in 1873, recorded the inscription as MARTI . OLLVDIO but noted it "seems to be corrupt". (Note: CIL VII 73: nomen dei videtur corruptum esse; Hübner, Inscriptiones Britanniae Latinae (1873), p. 31.) Only "faint traces" of the inscription were left in 1906 when Baddeley examined the relief in situ at the by-then neglected summerhouse, discerning only the final IO.

Baddeley advocated for recovering the artefacts and placing them in the local museum of Gloucestershire. More than twenty years after publication of his article, in 1929 the reliefs were transferred to what was then called Gloucester City Museum. (Note: For reasons that are unclear, when E. M. Clifford was compiling her article on Roman altars in Gloucestershire in 1938, she thought the Olludius relief from Custom Scrubs had been lost. She includes no photograph of it or its companion among the article's many plates of altars or votives to Mars. Under the influence of Heichelheim's "Olludius" entry in RE, she identifies another relief (plate V) of far more primitive style and execution as representing the Tree God, labelling it as Olludius. This expansion, lacking any epigraphic evidence, doesn't seem to have been picked up by subsequent scholars.) The inscription "to Mars Olludius" was no longer legible on the weathered stone in the late 1940s when the corpus of Roman Inscriptions of Britain was being compiled, and was noted as "no trace left".

== Iconography ==
Each of the Bisley reliefs depicts a male figure in a frontal stance, framed by the outline of a distyle temple, with a hip-high altar at his right. The standing figure labelled as Olludius extends a patera (offering plate) over the altar. In Lysons' engraving, the altar has a spiral garland, not visible on the relief after weathering. He holds a cornucopia, ordinarily in Roman art attributes of the Genius but not alien to Mars in Roman Britain. Given Mars' role as a guardian, specifically of agriculture in early Roman religion, Olludius may function as a sort of genius loci.

Silver coin attributed to the Dobunni, in whose territory the Olludius relief was found

The Olludius of this image exhibits few if any military attributes. The styling of the small head is unusual: either it is wearing a close-fitting cap, or the hair is cut short or braided closely to the scalp; Baddeley compares its appearance to "a Georgian wig". The figure is tall and broad so as to fill the space. He is clad in a long tunic that covers his knees and an "ample" intricately folded cloak (paludamentum or perhaps a forerunner of the full plaid) showing a herringbone pattern on the drape from the left shoulder over the left arm. His mid-calf boots (caligulae), though omitted in Lysons' engraving, remained well defined in Baddeley's observation even after weathering. The belt and sword shown by Lysons have been erased; the surface appears to have been smoothed down deliberately to make the relief flush when it was installed in the 1840s as part of the summerhouse wall.

The Olludius image is paired in origin with another male figure, apparently the work of the same craftsman, who signed this second image as Juventinus. The person making the dedication is named Gulioep̣ius or Culioetius; the reading is uncertain. The dedication is striking as the record of a religious act "by a native Briton with a strange Celtic name," fashioned by a local carver with a Roman name. The figure is often identified as Mars because he is armoured with shield, spear, and sword. The triple-crested helmet he wears resembles the shape, known also from Celtic coins, of a jester's cap. His knee-length tunic is vertically striped or pleated, with his lower abdomen covered by a solid semicircular apron. A fruit-filled cornucopia rests upright on the altar next to him. The impression of most scholars, not readily apparent from either Lysons' engraving nor the RIB sketches of the reliefs, (Note: Lysons' engravings elaborate more details than may be visible in other reproductions, including the photographs published by Miranda Green, but elide others that remained apparent nearly a hundred years later.) is that both images show a double cornucopia, with a triangular design under the mouth suggesting a cleft or fork in the body of the horn. (Note: Usually a double cornucopia has two distinct mouths branching from a single tip, but a double cornucopia to which these cornucopias would be similar appears on a votive altar from Gloucestershire, with an inscription to a Genius.) The inscription Deo Rom[u]lo ("to the god Romulus") indicates that the figure is Rome's mythic founder in his deified form, an unexpected and perhaps unique representation in Britain; in Roman art, Romulus is often costumed as his father Mars.

== Identification as a pan-Celtic deity ==
The two Bisley reliefs would not be identifiable as a Celtic Mars and Romulus on the basis of iconography without the inscriptions, and the pair serve as examples of how concepts of deity were reassembled through local religious traditions. Although no dedicand is named on the Olludius votum, Anne Ross saw a possible influence from Belgic Gaul, and Colette Bémont pointed rather to the regional presence of the Legio II Augusta, recruited in the Narbonensis (southern Gaul), where the Gallic Olloudios lamella was found.

Maxime Joseph has expressed caution in extrapolating far-flung cultivation of a specific Celtic deity named Olloudios based on two instances of Mars with a similar epithet, latinized as Olludius in Britain, widely separated by time and distance. The shared etymology may express a generally perceived function or quality of Mars among the Celts without implying that a particular deity's organized cultus was disseminated from one place to another.

== Name ==
A common interpretation of the name Olloudios is "[he of the] Big Tree" or "Mighty Tree", from *Ollo-u̯(i)dio-, compounded of Gaulish ollos, "large, great, whole" or "all, every", and uidu-, "tree; woodland, forest".

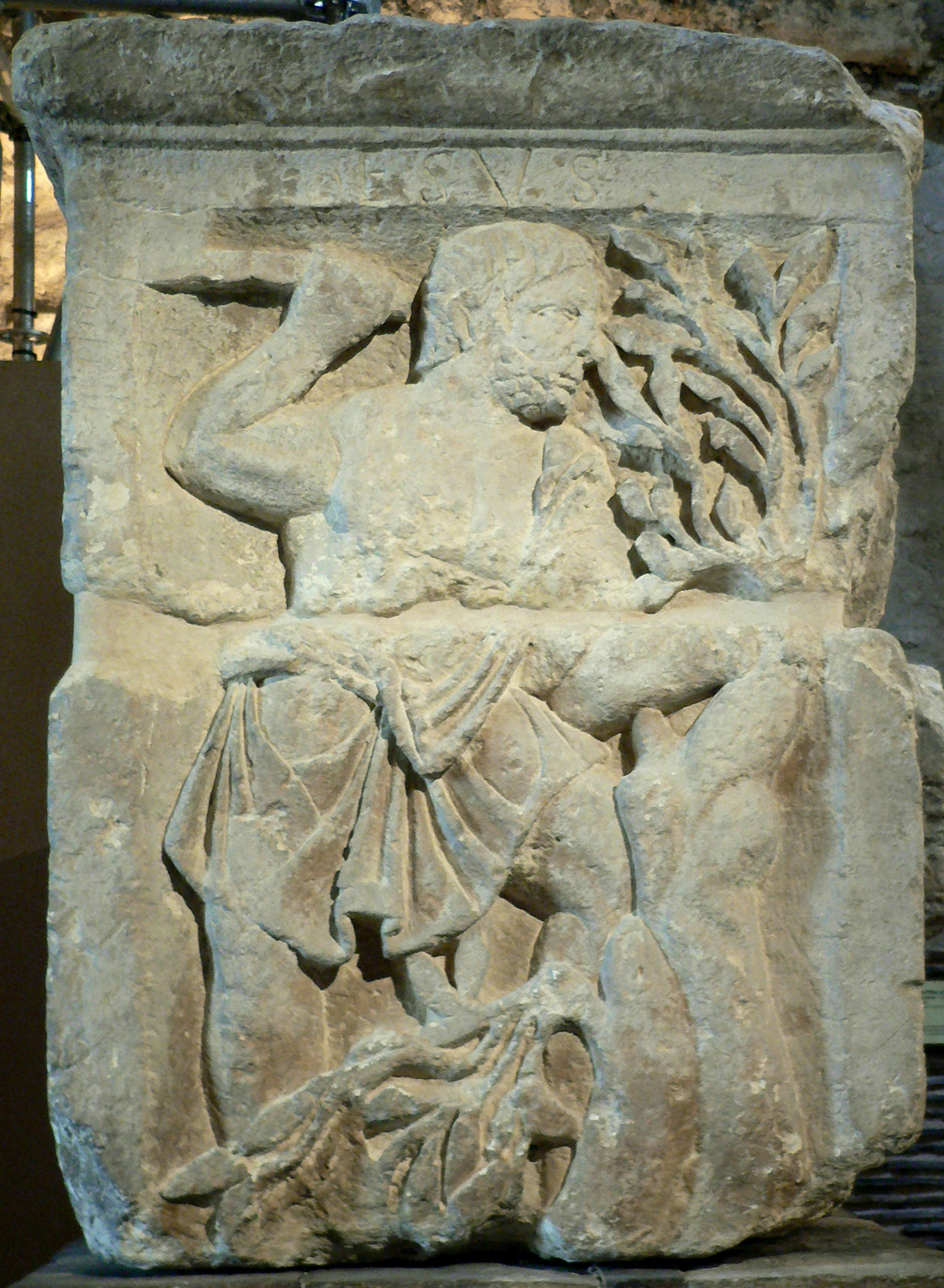
Esus with tree imagery on the Pillar of the Boatmen

Rudolf Thurneysen first proposed this derivation with comparison to an inscription Marti Uiduco, "to Mars Viducus", the woodland Mars, and with reference to the Celtic god Esus who received human sacrifice upon his tree, identified as Hesus Mars by the Berne scholiast. The alternate reading Olloubo does not affect the semantics of the name, if it is taken as a toponymic surname with the element loub meaning "woodland". The folklorist and archaeologist E. M. Clifford suggested that the British Olludius might be associated with local traditions of the Maypole, and that the iconography of Mars from Gloucestershire – with long spear and rounded shield under a Λ-shaped gable sometimes incised as a triangle at top – could refer to the underlying geometries of a maypole.

The second element of this compound name, on which the "tree" interpretation depends, permits an alternative. Alfred Holder equated oud- in the theonym Olloudius with aud-, giving among his examples bagauda, a word of vexed etymology referring to rural resistance fighters in the western provinces of the later Roman Empire. Also equating oud- and aud- but through a different semantic element, Joseph Loth preferred a derivation of Gaulish oudo- shared with Germanic *auða-, "wealth, good fortune, happiness," and thus saw Oll-oudios as the god who exercised sovereignty over the possession and distribution of the good things of life and their enjoyment. (Note: One premise of Loth's approach is that the study of Gaulish divine epithets "naturally" must draw on insular Celtic (l'étude des surnoms des divinités gauloises doit naturellement s'appuyer sur le celtique insulaire). He characterizes Holder's etymologies collectively as a minefield of conjecture (hypothèses hasardées).) Pursuant to Loth, Oswald Szemerényi seemed to accept or at least did not contest this interpretation of Olloudios, but landed on "give, grant" as the basic Germanic meaning of *auð- without returning to the epithet of Mars. Ellis Evans granted that the Celtic element aud-/oud- was likely cognate with Germanic in some but not all names, also without addressing the derivation of Olloudios specifically other than to mention it as an example of the word group at issue, while cautioning against the assumption that Indo-European *ou developed as au in Celtic. The role of Olloudios as "Master of All Destiny" was accepted as certain by Claude Sterckx.

Adolf Holtzmann suggested that Olloudios was a military epithet for Mars inspired by the Gaulish nickname of Legio V Alaudae, the "larks", a legion first raised in southern Gaul.

== Interpretations ==
Clébert mentions Olloudius among the highly localized but rather abstract deities who each served as a sort of genius loci before Roman influence in southern Gaul and were later attached to Mars; some, such as Olloudius, may instead represent new cult that localized the Roman Mars under a Gaulish epithet. The divine force or numen that Mars channeled was thus "dispersed in an infinity of centers". Jocelyn Toynbee saw the genius-like representations of Mars in Gloucestershire as revering him "in his capacity as god of agriculture, conquering sterility in crops and vanquisher of death and sickness", with Ross pointing to the cornucopia that appears in both images from Bisley as marking him as a "conveyor of fertility and plenty". Green interpreted the double cornucopia as a sign of the "prosperity function" of Olludius, with the more martial accompanying image embodying the pacific quality of Mars as "guardian against disease, barrenness and other evils" in a land at peace.

== Bibliography ==
- Allmer, Auguste (1902). "Dieux de la Gaule. I. Les dieux de la Gaule Celtique (suite 1482 à 1487)". Revue épigraphique (in French). 4 (104): 239–241. doi:10.3406/repig.1902.1418.
- Anthelmy, Joseph (Josephus Antelmius) (1726). Assertio pro unico S. Eucherio Lugdunensi Episcopo (in Latin). Briasson, Paris.
- Baddeley, W. St Clair (1906). "Certain Roman Remains at Watercombe, Near Bisley" (PDF). Transactions of the Bristol and Gloucestershire Archaeological Society. 29: 173–180.
- Baddeley, W. St Clair (1923). "Custom-Scrubs Roman Tump". Transactions of the Bristol and Gloucestershire Archaeological Society. 45: 87–90.
- Baker, Thomas (1846). "Roman Villa Discovered at Bisley, Gloucestershire". Archaeological Journal. 2: 42–47.
- Bémont, Colette (1981). "Observations sur quelques divinités gallo-romaines : les rapports entre la Bretagne et le continent". Études celtiques (in French). 18: 65–88. doi:10.3406/ecelt.1981.1674.
- Birley, Eric (1986). "The Deities of Roman Britain". Aufsteig und Niedgergang der Römischen Welt. II.18.1: 3–112.
- Blanc, Edmond (1878). Épigraphie antique du département des Alpes-Maritimes (in French). Malvano-Mignon.
- Burgers, Peter (1997). "The Narbonensian Colonial Elite". Ancient Society. 28: 89–106. JSTOR 44079780.
- Chastagnol, André (1992). Inscriptiones Latines de Narbonnaise: Antibes, Riez, Digne (in French). Vol. II. CNRS.
- Clébert, Jean-Paul (1970). Provence antique (in French). Vol. 2: L'époque gallo-romaine. Laffont.
- Clifford, E.M. (1938). "Roman Altars in Gloucestershire" (PDF). Transactions of the Bristol and Gloucestershire Archaeological Society. 60: 297–307.
- Clifford, E.M. (1944). "Cooper's Hill Wake". Folklore. 55 (3): 125–126.
- Collingwood, R.G.; Wright, R.P. (1965). The Roman Inscriptions of Britain. Vol. I: Inscriptions on Stone. Clarendon Press.
- Croxford, Ben (2016). "Art in Roman Britain". In Millett, Martin; Revell, Louise; Moore, Alison (eds.). The Oxford Handbook of Roman Britain. Oxford Handbooks (Oxford Academic ed.). Oxford University Press. pp. 599–618.
- Delamarre, Xavier (2003). Dictionnaire de la langue gauloise (in French) (2nd ed.). Errance.
- Fosbrooke, Thomas Dudley (1807). Abstracts of Records and Manuscripts Respecting the County of Gloucester, Formed into a History. Vol. 1. Jos. Harris.
- Evans, D. Ellis (1967). Gaulish Personal Names: A Study of Some Continental Celtic Formations. Clarendon.
- Green, Miranda J. (1986). "The Iconography and Archaeology of Romano-British Religion". Aufsteig und Niedgergang der Römischen Welt. II.18.1: 113–162.
- Green, Miranda (1997). Dictionary of Celtic Myth and Legend. Thames and Hudson.
- Joseph, Maxime (2021). "La Colonia Foroiuliensis (Fréjus) et ses dieux". Latomus (in French). 80 (4): 848–883.
- Hirschfeld, Otto (1888). Inscriptiones Galliae Narbonensis Latinae. Corpus Inscriptionum Latinarum (in Latin). Vol. XII.
- Holder, Alfred (1896). Alt-celtischer Sprachschatz (in German). Vol. 1. Teubner.
- Holtzmann, Adolf (1855). Kelten und Germanen (in German). Adolf Krabbe.
- Lawton, H. W. (1929). "The Religion of the Gallo-Romans". In Burkitt, F. C. (ed.). Speculum Religionis: Being Essays and Studies in Religion and Literature from Plato to Von Hügel. Clarendon Press. pp. 71–98.
- Loth, Joseph (1923). "Comptes rendus des séances de l'Académie des Inscriptions et Belles-Lettres". Études celtiques. 67 (4): 345–348. doi:10.3406/crai.1923.74813.
- Luján, Eugenio R. (2003). "Gaulish Personal Names: An Update". Études celtiques. 35: 181–247.
- Lysons, Samuel (1817). Reliquiae Britannico-Romanae: Containing Figures of Roman Antiquities Discovered in Various Parts of England. Vol. 2: Roman Antiquities Discovered in the County of Gloucestershire. Bensley, London.
- Ross, Anne (1967). Pagan Celtic Britain: Studies in Iconography and Tradition (rev. 1992 ed.). Constable.
- Spon, Jacob (Jacobus Sponius) (1685). Miscellanea eruditae antiquitatis (in Latin). Huguetan, Lyon.
- Sterckx, Claude (1986). "Review of The Wheel as a Cult-Symbol in the Romano-Celtic World with Special Reference to Gaul and Britain (Collection Latomus. 183) by Miranda Jane Green". L'Antiquité Classique. 55: 506–508. JSTOR 41656478.
- Stifter, David (2013). "Comments on the Chartres text, with a special attention on vowel-final forms". Études celtiques. 39: 169–180. doi:10.3406/ecelt.2013.2405.
- Szemerényi, Oswald (1955). "Lat. ūber". Glotta. 34: 272–287. JSTOR 40265698.
- Toynbee, J.M.C. (1963). Art in Roman Britain (2nd ed.). Phaidon.
- Weisgerber, Leo (1930). "Die Sprache der Festlandkelten". Bericht über die Fortschritte der römisch-germanischen Forschung (in German). 20: 272–287.
