= Dominique Garcia =

French archaeologist (born 1962)

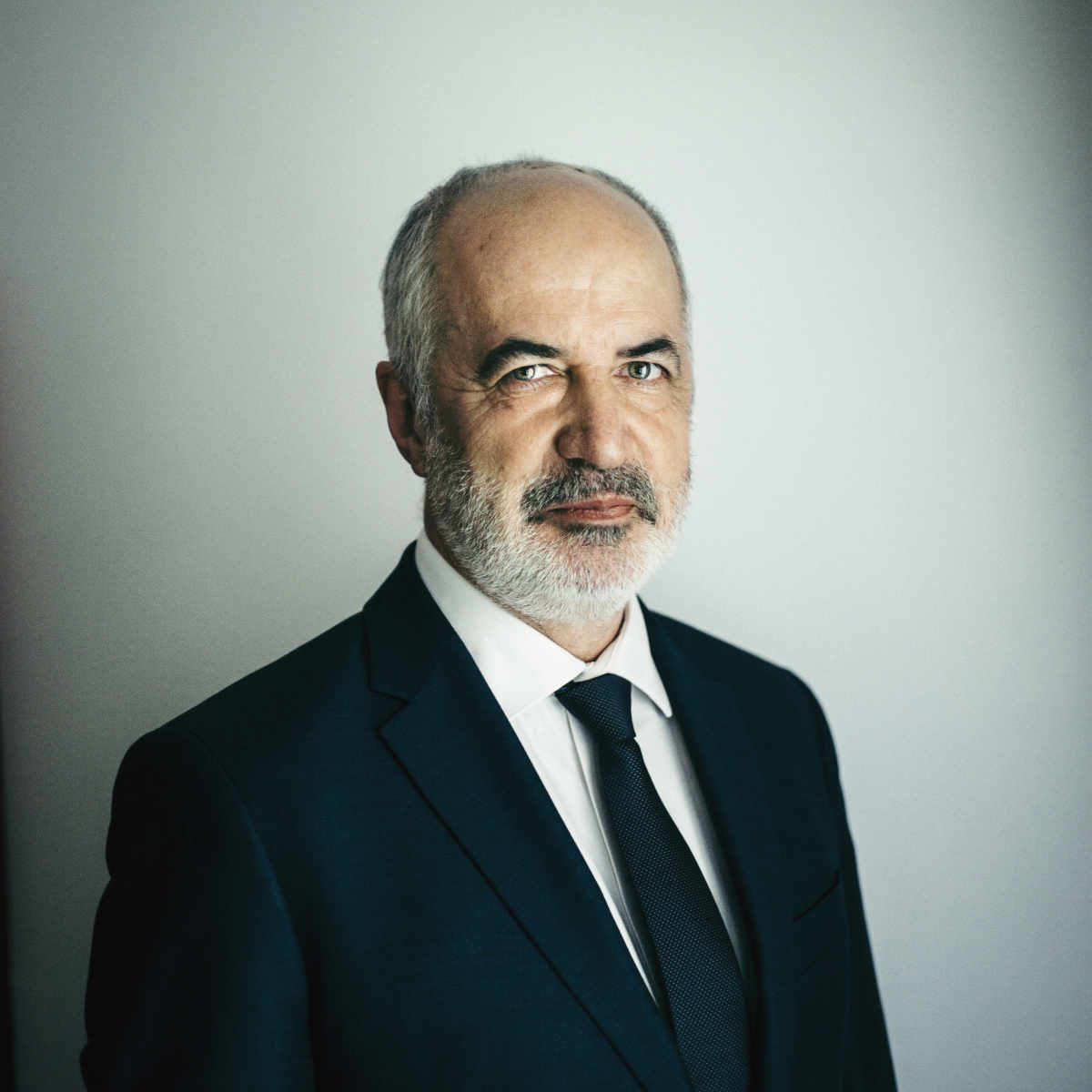
- Dominique Garcia in 2017
- Born: 3 June 1962 (age 64)
- Education: University of Montpellier Paul Valéry
- Known for: Protohistory of the western Mediterranean; presidency of INRAP
- Scientific career
- Fields: Archaeology, protohistory
- Workplaces: Aix-Marseille University; INRAP
- Thesis: Entre Ibères et Ligures : Lodévois et moyenne vallée de l'Hérault de la fin de l'Âge du Bronze au Principat d'Auguste (1990)
- Doctoral advisor: Christian Llinas

Dominique Garcia (born 3 June 1962) is a French archaeologist and historian. A specialist in the protohistory of the north-western Mediterranean and pre-Roman Gaul, he has been professor of archaeology at Aix-Marseille University since 2002 and president of the National Institute for Preventive Archaeological Research (INRAP), France's public body for rescue archaeology, since 2014. His research concerns the societies of the western Mediterranean in the 1st millennium BC, in particular the Celts, Gauls, Iberians and Ligurians, and their contacts with the Etruscan, Greek and Roman worlds.

== Early life and education ==
Garcia was born on 3 June 1962 in Clermont-l'Hérault, in the Hérault department of southern France. He grew up near the lake of Salagou. At the age of thirteen he joined an archaeology club run by his secondary-school teacher of classics, and learned to read the landscapes and geology of the region, from the Mediterranean coast to the Larzac plateau.

He enrolled at university in Montpellier to study psychology and art history, hoping to find his way into archaeology. From the late 1970s he took part in the rescue excavations prompted by large public-works schemes, working under the Association pour les fouilles archéologiques nationales (AFAN), the forerunner of INRAP. During the 1980s he excavated in Greece, Italy and Syria, before settling on the Mediterranean, and above all southern Gaul, as his main field.

Garcia obtained his doctorate in 1990 at University Paul Valéry in Montpellier, with a thesis that treated the middle valley of the Hérault and the Lodévois as a contact zone between the Iberian and Ligurian spheres. It was supervised by Christian Llinas. In 2000 he defended his habilitation at the University of Provence, supervised by Philippe Leveau.

== Career ==
Garcia was appointed a lecturer (maître de conférences) at the University of Provence in 1992 and became professor there in 2002, holding the chair of national antiquities and European protohistory at what is now Aix-Marseille University. He directed fieldwork in the Midi, notably at Lattes, and took part in excavations in France and abroad.

He was deputy director and then director of the Centre Camille Jullian, a joint research unit of the CNRS, Aix-Marseille University and the Ministry of Culture, from 2008 to 2011. He also headed the doctoral school "Espaces, Cultures, Sociétés" (ED 355).

From 2012 to 2014 Garcia was vice-president of the Conseil national de la recherche archéologique. In that capacity he chaired a commission on the scientific, economic and social assessment of rescue archaeology, whose 2013 white paper he submitted to the Minister of Culture, Aurélie Filippetti. The report argued for a measured view of the sector rather than an ideological contest between public and private operators.

By decree of 24 June 2014 Garcia was appointed president of INRAP, succeeding Jean-Paul Jacob, who had led the institute since July 2008. INRAP is France's largest archaeological operator, with some 2,000 staff and about as many field operations each year.

== Research ==
Garcia works on the protohistoric societies of the north-western Mediterranean during the 1st millennium BC. He is concerned above all with ethnogenesis, the process by which communities descended from the Bronze Age formed new cultures through contact with literate Mediterranean peoples such as the Greeks, Etruscans and Romans. His doctoral work treated the middle Hérault as a frontier between the Iberian and Ligurian worlds, shaped by its copper deposits and the trade they generated.

He argues that ancient peoples were not fixed identities but historical constructions, and that there is no single origin of the French. In his account, archaeology offers "landmarks for all" rather than "roots for some". He set out this view for a general readership in Les Gaulois à l'œil nu (2021), which presents Gaul as an entity largely defined by Caesar during his conquest, and Gaulish culture as a product of interaction with neighbouring societies.

The prehistorian Jean Guilaine, a professor emeritus at the Collège de France who sat on Garcia's doctoral jury and later worked with him, has described him as a man of the frontier, connecting his taste for synthesis to his origins in the Hérault valley, a historical meeting point of Ligurian and Iberian influences.

== Honours ==
- Senior member of the Institut universitaire de France (2011).
- Chevalier (Knight) of the Legion of Honour. He was appointed in 2013, and the insignia were presented in April 2014 by Aurélie Filippetti.

== Selected publications ==
- Garcia, Dominique (1993). Entre Ibères et Ligures. Lodévois et moyenne vallée de l'Hérault protohistoriques. Revue archéologique de Narbonnaise, suppl. 26 (in French). Paris: CNRS.
- Garcia, Dominique; Verdin, Florence, eds. (2002). Territoires celtiques : espaces ethniques et territoires des agglomérations protohistoriques d'Europe occidentale (in French). Paris: Errance.
- Garcia, Dominique (2004) [rev. ed. 2014]. La Celtique méditerranéenne : habitats et sociétés en Languedoc et en Provence, VIIIe–IIe siècles av. J.-C (in French). Paris: Errance.
- Guilaine, Jean; Carozza, Laurent; Garcia, Dominique; et al. (2017). Launac et le Launacien : dépôts de bronzes protohistoriques du sud de la Gaule (in French). Montpellier: Presses universitaires de la Méditerranée.
- Bouffier, Sophie; Garcia, Dominique, eds. (2017). Greek Marseille and Mediterranean Celtic Region. Oxford: Peter Lang.
- Garcia, Dominique, ed. (2017). Archéologie des migrations (in French). Paris: La Découverte / INRAP.
- Guilaine, Jean; Garcia, Dominique (2018). La Protohistoire de la France (in French). Paris: Hermann.
- Demoule, Jean-Paul; Garcia, Dominique; Schnapp, Alain, eds. (2018). Une histoire des civilisations : comment l'archéologie bouleverse nos connaissances (in French). Paris: La Découverte. ISBN 978-2-7071-8878-6.
- Garcia, Dominique (2021). Les Gaulois à l'œil nu (in French). Paris: CNRS Éditions. ISBN 978-2-271-13221-5.
- Garcia, Dominique (2021). La Fabrique de la France (in French). Paris: Flammarion / INRAP. ISBN 978-2-08-023470-4.
- Guilaine, Jean; Garcia, Dominique; Gascó, Jean (2022). Rochelongue (Agde, Hérault) : lingots et bronzes protohistoriques par centaines dans la mer (in French). Montpellier: Presses universitaires de la Méditerranée.
- Garcia, Dominique; Bouiron, Marc, eds. (2023). Atlas archéologique de la France (in French). Paris: Tallandier. ISBN 979-10-210-5938-2.
