= Colette Bémont =

French archaeologist (1933–2023)

- Born: 1933
- Died: 16 April 2023
- Known for: Studies of the terra sigillata of Roman Gaul

Academic background
- Education: University of Paris
- Thesis: Recherches méthodologiques sur la céramique sigillée. Les vases estampillés de Glanum (1976)

Academic work
- Discipline: Archaeology
- Sub-discipline: Roman terra sigillata
- Institutions: Centre national de la recherche scientifique; University of Poitiers; Pantheon-Sorbonne University; École pratique des hautes études

Colette Bémont (1933 – 16 April 2023) was a French archaeologist and a research director at the Centre national de la recherche scientifique (CNRS). A specialist in Roman fine pottery, she is known for her work on the terra sigillata (samian ware) of Roman Gaul, for directing standard reference works on Gaulish pottery workshops and terracotta figurines, and for the part she played in the renewal of Roman ceramic studies in France.

== Life and career ==
Bémont was a member of the École française de Rome from 1957 to 1960, in the same cohort as the historian Claude Nicolet. She held a doctorat ès lettres and taught first at the University of Poitiers. She then spent the whole of her career at the CNRS, where she became a research director (directrice de recherche), latterly emeritus, while continuing to teach, first at Paris 1 and afterwards at the École pratique des hautes études. She published more than sixty works. She died on 16 April 2023.

== Research ==
Bémont specialised in Roman, and particularly Gallo-Roman, fine pottery, above all the stamped and moulded terra sigillata made in Gaul. Her doctoral thesis appeared in 1976 in the Bibliothèque des Écoles françaises d'Athènes et de Rome as Recherches méthodologiques sur la céramique sigillée. Les vases estampillés de Glanum, a study of potters' stamps and of the method for treating them. Her work was closely bound up with the production centres of Glanum and La Graufesenque.

Bémont brought together, under a succession of institutional arrangements, a large group of pottery specialists of varied backgrounds, several of whom went on to hold senior posts, among them Jean-Paul Jacob, later the second president of the National Institute for Preventive Archaeological Research (Inrap). Through this network she wrote the chronicle of Gallo-Roman ceramics that ran in the Revue des Études Anciennes from 1978 to 1996, and she directed several collaborative works. The most substantial are two reference volumes in the Documents d'archéologie française series that she co-directed, on the terra sigillata of Roman Gaul in 1986 and on Gallo-Roman terracotta figurines in 1993. The first updated an inventory of the production sites whose previous state dated from 1968.

Bémont also held an important editorial role at the journal Gallia under its director Paul-Marie Duval. As Duval was then chiefly occupied with the Celtic world, he left her broad responsibility for the journal's Gallo-Roman material, in which capacity she trained and corrected many contributors. Although she formally directed few doctoral theses, she in practice supervised a substantial number of students. Away from ceramics she also published on Gallo-Roman religion and iconography, including a 1979 study of the vegetal ornament of the Gundestrup cauldron and a 1981 examination of Gallo-Roman deities attested on both sides of the English Channel.

== Selected publications ==
- Bémont, Colette (1976). Recherches méthodologiques sur la céramique sigillée. Les vases estampillés de Glanum. Bibliothèque des Écoles françaises d'Athènes et de Rome. Vol. 227. Rome: École française de Rome.
- Bémont, Colette (1979). "Le bassin de Gundestrup: remarques sur les décors végétaux". Études Celtiques. 16: 69–99.
- Bémont, Colette (1981). "Observations sur quelques divinités gallo-romaines: les rapports entre la Bretagne et le continent". Études Celtiques. 18: 65–88.
- Bémont, Colette; Jacob, Jean-Paul, eds. (1986). La terre sigillée gallo-romaine. Lieux de production du Haut-Empire: implantations, produits, relations. Documents d'archéologie française. Vol. 6. Paris: Éditions de la Maison des sciences de l'homme.
- Bémont, Colette; Vernhet, Alain; Beck, Françoise (1987). La Graufesenque. Village de potiers gallo-romains. Paris: Ministère de la Culture et de la Communication.
- Bémont, Colette; Jeanlin, Micheline; Lahanier, Christian, eds. (1993). Les figurines en terre cuite gallo-romaines. Documents d'archéologie française. Vol. 38. Paris: Éditions de la Maison des sciences de l'homme.
