= Jean-Paul Jacob =

French archaeologist (born 1948)

President of the National Institute for Preventive Archaeological Research
- In office July 2008 – March 2014
- Preceded by: Jean-Paul Demoule
- Succeeded by: Dominique Garcia

Personal details
- Born: 21 March 1948 (age 78)
- Occupation: Archaeologist

Jean-Paul Jacob (born 21 March 1948) is a French archaeologist and heritage official who was president of the National Institute for Preventive Archaeological Research (Inrap), the national body for preventive archaeology, from 2008 to 2014. A conservateur général du patrimoine, the senior grade of the French heritage service, he specialises in ceramology and the archaeology of mining.

== Career ==
Jacob holds a doctorat d'État and became a conservateur général du patrimoine. He was in turn a researcher at the Centre national de la recherche scientifique (CNRS), director of antiquities for Franche-Comté, regional curator of archaeology for Provence-Alpes-Côte d'Azur, regional director of cultural affairs for French Guiana and then for Pays de la Loire, and inspector-general of architecture and heritage at the Ministry of Culture.

By decree of 2 July 2008 Jacob was appointed president of Inrap, in succession to Jean-Paul Demoule, who had held the post since 2002. His term was renewed by decree of 28 June 2011. He remained president until March 2014, when he was succeeded by Dominique Garcia. Inrap is the largest archaeological research body in France, carrying out around 2,000 field operations a year.

Jacob was also a member of the Commission nationale des monuments historiques and of the Conseil national de la recherche archéologique. From 2007 he served as vice-president and then president of the jury of the competitive examination for heritage curators.

== Research ==
Jacob trained as a historian of law and an archaeologist of the classical period, and works chiefly on ceramology and the archaeology of mining. His study Le monde des potiers gallo-romains approached the production of Gallo-Roman terra sigillata as a social, economic and legal question. With Colette Bémont he directed La terre sigillée gallo-romaine (1986), a reference survey of the terra sigillata workshops of Roman Gaul. With Michel Mangin he co-edited a study of mining and metalworking in Franche-Comté (1990). He has also published articles on the archaeology of death, Saharan prehistory and ancient pottery. Jacob is a native of the Yonne.

== Selected publications ==
- Jacob, Jean-Paul (1981). Le monde des potiers gallo-romains: esquisse d'une problématique sociale, économique et juridique.
- Bémont, Colette; Jacob, Jean-Paul, eds. (1986). La terre sigillée gallo-romaine. Lieux de production du Haut-Empire: implantations, produits, relations. Documents d'archéologie française. Vol. 6. Paris: Éditions de la Maison des sciences de l'homme.
- Jacob, Jean-Paul; Mangin, Michel, eds. (1990). De la mine à la forge en Franche-Comté, des origines au XIXe siècle.
