= Jean-Paul Demoule =

French archaeologist (born 1947)

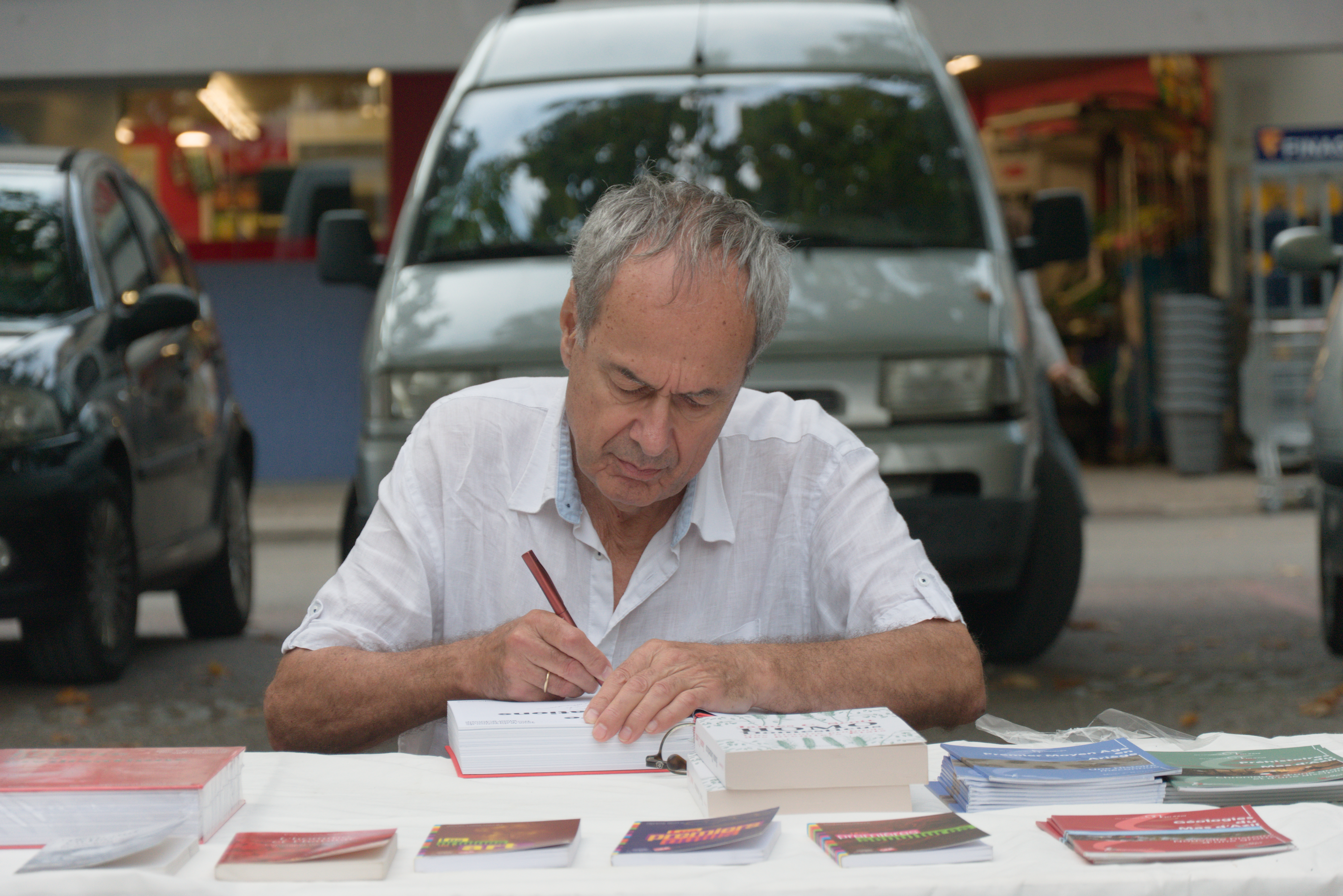
- Jean-Paul Demoule in 2019
- Born: 7 August 1947 (age 79); Neuilly-sur-Seine, France

Academic background
- Education: École normale supérieure; Saarland University; University of Paris

Academic work
- Discipline: Archaeology
- Sub-discipline: European protohistory
- Institutions: Paris 1 Panthéon-Sorbonne
- Main interests: Neolithic and Iron Age Europe; history and social role of archaeology
- Notable works: The Indo-Europeans (2014)

Jean-Paul Demoule (born 7 August 1947) is a French archaeologist and prehistorian. He is professor emeritus of European protohistory at Paris 1 Panthéon-Sorbonne and an honorary member of the Institut Universitaire de France. He was the first president of the National Institute for Preventive Archaeological Research (Inrap), from its establishment in 2002 until 2008, and had taken a leading part in the reform that created preventive archaeology in France. His research concerns the Neolithic and the Iron Age of Europe and the history and social role of archaeology, and he is widely known to the general public for his 2014 book The Indo-Europeans, a critique of the idea of an original Indo-European people whose linguistic claims were rejected by specialists.

== Early life and education ==
Demoule was born on 7 August 1947 at Neuilly-sur-Seine. He was a student at the École normale supérieure in Paris, and took a doctorat de troisième cycle in art history and archaeology in 1975, a doctorate in prehistory at the University of Saarbrücken in 1979, and a doctorat d'État ès lettres in 1992. As a student he excavated in Greece, from 1969, at the Neolithic site of Dikili Tash, under Jean Deshayes.

== Career ==
Demoule was a lecturer (maître de conférences) in protohistory at Paris 1 from 1983 to 1992 and then professor of protohistory there from 1992, a post he held, apart from his years at Inrap, until his retirement in 2016, when he became professor emeritus. He was a member of the Institut Universitaire de France from 2011 to 2016 and an honorary member thereafter.

Demoule was closely involved with rescue archaeology and with the professionalisation of the discipline in France. In 1998 the minister of culture Catherine Trautmann entrusted a working group made up of Demoule, the conseiller d'État Bernard Pêcheur and the mayor of Quimper Bernard Poignant with preparing a new law for the protection of archaeological heritage. The law of January 2001, which created Inrap, followed from this work. Demoule became the institute's first president on its establishment in 2002 and held the office until 2008, when he was succeeded by Jean-Paul Jacob.

== Research ==
Demoule specialises in the Neolithic and the Iron Age, in particular the neolithisation of Europe and Iron Age societies, as well as in the history of archaeology and its social and ideological uses. He carried out excavations in the regional rescue programme of the Aisne valley and in Greece and Bulgaria, including several decades of work at the Neolithic site of Kovačevo in Bulgaria. In 2010, with the anthropologist Bernard Müller, he excavated Le Déjeuner sous l'herbe, a 1983 work by the artist Daniel Spoerri, in what has been described as the first archaeological excavation of a work of contemporary art.

=== The Indo-European question ===
Demoule's best-known book among the general public, The Indo-Europeans, published in French in 2014 and translated into English in 2023, argues that, although the Indo-European languages are demonstrably related, the reconstruction of a single ancestral people speaking a common language in a definite homeland is a modern myth of Western origins, and it traces the ideological and political uses of the idea. The book reached a wide readership, but its central linguistic claims were rejected by specialists in Indo-European studies. In a detailed rebuttal, the linguists Thomas Pellard, Laurent Sagart and Guillaume Jacques argued that his criticisms rest on a biased and outdated reading of the field and contain numerous errors, and they held that a common ancestral language remains the only model that accounts for the inflectional morphology shared across the family. Demoule contested these criticisms in turn, in a reply written with the linguist Gabriel Bergounioux.

== Selected publications ==
- Demoule, Jean-Paul, ed. (2004). La France archéologique: vingt ans d'aménagements et de découvertes. Paris: Hazan/Inrap.
- Demoule, Jean-Paul; Stiegler, Bernard, eds. (2008). L'Avenir du passé: modernité de l'archéologie. Paris: La Découverte.
- Demoule, Jean-Paul (2009). L'Europe: un continent redécouvert par l'archéologie. Paris: Gallimard.
- Demoule, Jean-Paul (2012). On a retrouvé l'histoire de France: comment l'archéologie raconte notre passé.
- Demoule, Jean-Paul (2014). Mais où sont passés les Indo-Européens? Le mythe d'origine de l'Occident. Paris: Seuil.
  - Demoule, Jean-Paul (2023). The Indo-Europeans: Archaeology, Language, Race, and the Search for the Origins of the West. Oxford University Press. ISBN 978-0-19-750647-9.
- Demoule, Jean-Paul; Garcia, Dominique; Schnapp, Alain, eds. (2018). Une histoire des civilisations: comment l'archéologie bouleverse nos connaissances. Paris: La Découverte/Inrap.
- Demoule, Jean-Paul (2019). Trésors: les petites et grandes découvertes qui font l'archéologie. Paris: Flammarion.
- Demoule, Jean-Paul (2020). Aux origines, l'archéologie: une science au cœur des grands débats de notre temps. Paris: La Découverte.
- Demoule, Jean-Paul (2022). Homo migrans: de la sortie d'Afrique au Grand Confinement. Paris: Payot.
