= Joseph Anthelmi =

French ecclesiastical historian (1648– 1697)

Joseph Anthelmi (Antelmi; 25 July 1648 at Fréjus – 21 June 1697 at Fréjus) was a French ecclesiastical historian.

== Life ==
Several of Anthelmi's ancestors had occupied canonries in Fréjus, the history and traditions of which they had investigated and preserved. Joseph, feeling himself called to the priesthood, betook himself to Lyon, where he entered on the study of theology under the François de la Chaise, a Jesuit priest.

On being ordained, Anthelmi returned to Provence, and was soon made canon of Fréjus Cathedral, though he preferred study. His uncles, Pierre and Nicolas, had published a work on the former incumbents of the See of Fréjus; Anthelmi resolved to devote himself especially to the history of the French Catholic Church, beginning with his own diocese.

In 1694, Anthelmi was made vicar-general to the Bishop of Pamiers; but his health was bad, and he returned to his native city in a vain attempt to recuperate. Here he died in his forty-ninth year.

== Controversy ==
Anthelmi's first work appeared in 1680, De inito ecclesiae Forojuliensis dissertatio chronologica, critica, profano-sacra. Pasquier Quesnel, was then at the height of his reputation, and was agitating France on the question of the real author of the De vocatione gentium, the Responsiones pro Augustino ad Capitula Gallorum and the Epistola ad Demetriadem (Patrologia Latina, LI, 647,158; LV, 162). In his opinion these had been written by Leo the Great. Against him Anthelmi supported the authorship of Prosper of Aquitaine. The contest was maintained by both parties, their letters being published in the Journal des Savants, in 1689.

Toward the close of the same year, Anthelmi vindicated his position by the publication at Paris of his work De veris operibus SS. Patrum Leonis et Prosperi. The opposition between Anthelmi and Quesnel burst out anew in regard to the authorship of the Athanasian Creed. Quesnel thought it the work of Vigilius, Bishop of Thapsus, in Africa, who towards the end of the fifth century was driven from his see by Huneric, King of the Vandals, and taking refuge in Constantinople wrote against the Arians, Eutychians, and Nestorians, attributing his own works to Augustine of Hippo and Athanasius of Alexandria. Anthelmi, on the contrary, inclined to the view of Pithou, père, (Note: Pierre Pithou (1496—1554) was a distinguished scholar and lawyer, the father of François Pithou, Jean Pithou, Nicolas Pithou and Pierre Pithou, fils.) who attributed it to Vincent of Lérins; and in 1693 he published his Nova de symbolo Athanasiano disquisitio. In this work Anthelmi sought to prove that the Creed cannot be the production of Athanasius, as it was composed not earlier than the fifth century; and that its author was a Gaul. Vincent was known to have had the intention of filling out at length a confession of faith in the mysteries of the Trinity and the Incarnation; this, taken in conjunction with the similarity of style and expression between the Athanasian Creed and the writings of Vincent, is the foundation of Anthelmi's argument.

== Family ==
His brother Charles, Bishop of Grasse, collected and published several other historical papers, the most notable of which was a pamphlet, The Life and Death of St. Martin of Tours.
