= Welbore St Clair Baddeley =

Welbore St Clair Baddeley (1856–1945) was an English historian, archaeologist, dramatist, travel-writer, and poet.

== Works ==
Baddeley composed a number of travel guides to Italy (including Venice, Sicily, and Florence), frequently co-writing with Augustus J. C. Hare, and making use of his acquaintance with the Italian archaeologists Rodolfo Lanciani and Giacomo Boni. He also wrote historical studies of the region, including Robert the Wise and His Heirs, 1278–1352 (Heinemann, 1897). His drama and poetry included the following publications:

- George Villiers, Duke of Buckingham; a Drama, and other Poems (1878)
- John Dudley, Duke of Northumberland, an Historical Tragedy, and Songs and Poems (1879)
- The Daughter of Jepthah, a Lyrical Tragedy, and other Poems (1879)

He also wrote on Gloucestershire history, publishing:

- Place-names of Gloucestershire: A Handbook (1913)
- A History of Cirencester (1924)
- A Cotteswold Manor, Being the History of Painswick (1929)

He was a friend of James McNeill Whistler.

== Archives ==
- Gloucestershire Record Office (a collection of Baddeley's papers, notebooks, and diaries)
- Leeds University Library (letters to Lilias, Countess Bathurst, 1920–36)
- Leeds University Library (letters to Lord Bathurst, 1923–31)
