= Elsie Margaret Clifford =

English county archaeologist (1886 – 1976)

- Born: 4 June 1886
- Died: 3 September 1976 (aged 90)
- Occupation: Author, archaeologist
- Awards: Officer of the Order of the British Empire

Elsie Margaret Clifford FSA OBE (1886 – 1976) was a British archaeologist.

== Life ==
Elsie Margaret Chambers was born on 4 June 1886 at 54 Regent Street, Gloucester to Frederick William Chambers, a railway engine driver, and his second wife Mary Ann, née Hughes. She was baptised Elsie Margaret Annie Chambers at All Saints, Gloucester on her first birthday.

Elsie's parents had married in 1883 at Bagendon, where her mother was in service, but this appears to be entirely coincidental and of no relevance to Elsie’s subsequent interest in Bagendon as an archaeological site. Her parents were from comparatively humble origins. Her father was the son of an excise officer who began as a stoker on the railways, progressing to become an engine driver, and later somehow earned enough money to become the owner of a small farm called Fairmile in Hucclecote, Gloucester, as well as running a brickyard and the gravel pits at Barnwood. Her mother was the daughter of a furnaceman in the Forest of Dean, and was working as a domestic servant when she married Elsie's father.

Elsie married Harold Brookes Clifford at the Wesleyan Methodist Church, Hucclecote, near Gloucester, in 1909. Her husband was the manager and later chairman of the haulage contractor, motor garage and car sales company F.W. Chambers & Co., Barnwood Garages, that had evolved out of her father's business interests. They lived in Hucclecote with Elsie's parents initially, but moved to Chandler's Farm, Little Witcombe in the late 1920s.

Elsie became interested in archaeology as a result of the discovery of various prehistoric and Roman finds on her father's property, in particular the gravel pits at Barnwood. In the 1920s she was invited by M.C. Burkitt to attend his archaeology lectures at the University of Cambridge for a year. Her first published work did not come until 1930, when she was already in her mid-40s, and, appropriately enough, discussed finds from her family's gravel beds at Barnwood over the preceding 25 years. From this date onwards, however, she published widely and frequently, mostly on archaeology, but also on folklore and local history. Over the next 37 years, she authored over 40 articles in at least 8 different journals, including two that appeared in the BGAS Transactions in 1967, when she was aged 81.

Though prolific, she maintained her status as an amateur archaeologist. Her archaeological work often consisted of re-excavating existing sites, such as the Neolithic barrows at Notgrove (1934 – 6), Nympsfield and Rodmarton, and Roman villas at Hucclecote, Barnwood and Witcombe. She identified a Late Iron Age settlement at Minchindon.

In the 1930s, she discovered Belgic pottery in a gravel quarry near Bagendon. She returned in 1961 to direct a dig at the previously unexcavated Iron Age settlement there. Her most extensive and best known published work is her account of her work at this site, Bagendon: A Belgic Oppidum.

She was elected as a fellow of the Society of Antiquaries of Scotland in 1929, but her first application to become a fellow of the Society of Antiquaries of London, in 1937, was unsuccessful (women having only been admitted since 1920). She was elected at the second attempt in 1944. She also served as President of the Cotteswold Naturalists' Field Club (1936-8), and as the first woman president of the Bristol and Gloucestershire Archaeological Society (BGAS) in 1949.

She received an OBE for services to archaeology in 1968.

== Bibliography ==
- Clifford, E. M. (1930). "A Prehistoric and Roman Site at Barnwood near Gloucester". Trans. Bristol Gloucestershire Archaeol. Soc. 52: 201–254.
- Clifford, Mrs Brookes (1933). "An Anglian cross in Gloucestershire". The Antiquaries Journal. 13 (3): 301–302. doi:10.1017/S0003581500093793.
- Clifford, E. M. (1933). "The Roman Villa, Hucclecote". Trans. Bristol Gloucestershire Archaeol. Soc. 55: 323–376.
- Clifford, E. M. (1934). "An Early Iron Age Site at Barnwood, Gloucestershire". Trans. Bristol Gloucestershire Archaeol. Soc. 56: 227–230.
- Clifford, E. M. (1934). "Finds at Barnwood, Gloucestershire". Trans. Bristol Gloucestershire Archaeol. Soc. 56: 231–235.
- Clifford, Mrs Brookes (1934). "An Early British Fragment". The Antiquaries Journal. 14 (1): 59–61. doi:10.1017/S0003581500037938.
- Clifford, E. M. (1935). "13th century pendant, Barnwood". Trans. Bristol Gloucestershire Archaeol. Soc. 57: 278–279.
- Clifford, E. M. (1935). "Notes on some Roman viilas in Gloucestershire". Proceedings of the Cotteswold Naturalists' Field Club. 25 (3): 237–256.
- Clifford, E. M. (1935). "Notgrove long barrow". Proceedings of the Cotteswold Naturalists' Field Club. 25 (3): 302.
- Clifford, E. M. (1935). "Palaeolithic hand-axe, Barnwood". Proceedings of the Cotteswold Naturalists' Field Club. 25 (3): 303.
- Clifford, E. M. (1936). "Notgrove Long Barrow, Gloucestershire". Archaeologia. 86: 119–161. doi:10.1017/S0261340900015393.
- Clifford, E. M. (1936). "Notes on the Neolithic period in the Cotteswolds". Proceedings of the Cotteswold Naturalists' Field Club. 26 (1): 33–49.
- Clifford, E. M. (1936). "Jackbarrow". Proceedings of the Cotteswold Naturalists' Field Club. 26 (1): 101.
- Clifford, E. M. (1936). "Excavations at Rodborough". Proceedings of the Cotteswold Naturalists' Field Club. 26 (1): 101.
- Clifford, E. M. (1936). "Possible prehistoric site near Cross Hands". Proceedings of the Cotteswold Naturalists' Field Club. 26 (1): 101–2.
- Clifford, E. M. (1936). "Mollusca from Barnwood gravels". Proceedings of the Cotteswold Naturalists' Field Club. 26 (1): 102.
- Clifford, E. M. (1937). "A Palaeolith from Gloucestershire". Proceedings of the Prehistoric Society. 3: 465–466. doi:10.1017/S0079497X00021496.
- Clifford, E. M. (1937). "The Beaker Folk in the Cotswolds". Proceedings of the Prehistoric Society. 3: 159–163. doi:10.1017/S0079497X00021368.
- Clifford, E. M. (1937). "The Earthworks at Rodborough, Amberley, and Minchinhampton, Gloucestershire". Trans. Bristol Gloucestershire Archaeol. Soc. 59: 287–307.
- Clifford, E. M. (1937). "Jackbarrow, Duntisbourne Abbots". Trans. Bristol Gloucestershire Archaeol. Soc. 59: 334–337.
- Clifford, E. M. (1937). "Archaeological objects of special interest in Gloucestershire". Proceedings of the Cotteswold Naturalists' Field Club. 26 (2): 159–168.
- Clifford, E. M. (1937). "Discovery of beaker at Prestbury". Proceedings of the Cotteswold Naturalists' Field Club. 26 (2): 206.
- Clifford, E. M. (1937). "Nympsfield long barrow". Proceedings of the Cotteswold Naturalists' Field Club. 26 (2): 206.
- Clifford, E. M. (1938). "The Excavation of Nympsfield Long Barrow, Gloucestershire". Proceedings of the Prehistoric Society. 4(1): 188–213. doi:10.1017/S0079497X00021186.
- Clifford, E. M. (1938). "The Soldier's Grave, Frocester, Gloucestershire". Proceedings of the Prehistoric Society. 4(1): 214–218. doi:10.1017/S0079497X00021198.
- Clifford, E. M. (1938). "Roman Altars in Gloucestershire". Trans. Bristol Gloucestershire Archaeol. Soc. 60: 297–307.
- Clifford, E. M. (1938). "Underground Chambers, Miserden". Trans. Bristol Gloucestershire Archaeol. Soc. 60: 343–346.
- Clifford, E. M.; Cave, A. J. E. (1938). "Beaker found at Prestbury". Trans. Bristol Gloucestershire Archaeol. Soc. 60: 348–349.
- Clifford, E. M.; Cave, A. J. E. (1938). "Human Remains, Charlton Kings". Trans. Bristol Gloucestershire Archaeol. Soc. 60: 350–351.
- Clifford, E. M. (1938). "The Beaker phase in Cotswold". Proceedings of the Cotteswold Naturalists' Field Club. 26 (3): 256–264.
- Clifford, E. M. (1938). "Witcombe Roman villa". Proceedings of the Cotteswold Naturalists' Field Club. 26 (3): 328.
- Clifford, E. M. (1938). "An early British enamel". The Antiquaries Journal. 18: 75–76.
- Clifford, E. M.; Simpson, C. A. (1939). "A Possible Neolithic Trackway". Geography. 24: 230–39. JSTOR 40561666.
- Clifford, E. M. (1939). "Witcombe Roman villa". Proceedings of the Cotteswold Naturalists' Field Club. 27 (1): 54.
- Clifford, E. M. (1939). "Rodmarton long barrow". Proceedings of the Cotteswold Naturalists' Field Club. 27 (1): 54.
- Clifford, E. M. (1939). "Palaeolith from the Upper Thames". The Antiquaries Journal. 19: 193.
- Clifford, E. M. (1939). "Roman fir-cone of terracotta". The Antiquaries Journal. 19: 194.
- Clifford, E. M. (1948). "Archaeology (notes)". Proceedings of the Cotteswold Naturalists' Field Club. 30 (1): 50.
- Clifford, E. M. (1949). "The Severn as a Highway in Prehistoric Times". Trans. Bristol Gloucestershire Archaeol. Soc. 68: 5–13.
- Clifford, E. M. (1949). "Archaeology (notes)". Proceedings of the Cotteswold Naturalists' Field Club. 30 (2): 201.
- Clifford, E. M. (1950). "The Ivy Lodge Round Barrow". Trans. Bristol Gloucestershire Archaeol. Soc. 69: 59–77.
- Clifford, E. M.; Garrod, D. A. E.; Gracie, H. S. (1954). "Flint Implements from Gloucestershire". The Antiquaries Journal. 34(3-4): 178–187. doi:10.1017/S0003581500059849.
- Clifford, E. M. (1954). "The Roman Villa at Witcombe, Gloucestershire". Trans. Bristol Gloucestershire Archaeol. Soc. 73: 5–69.
- Clifford, E. M. (1955). "Stamped Tiles found in Gloucestershire". Journal of Roman Studies. 45(1-2): 68–72. doi:10.2307/298745.
- Clifford, E. M.; Brothwell, D. R. (1957). "A Romano-British Burial at South Cerney, Gloucestershire". Trans. Bristol Gloucestershire Archaeol. Soc. 76: 157–160.
- Clifford, E. M. (1959). "Fossil reptiles and other animals". Proceedings of the Cotteswold Naturalists' Field Club. 33 (3): 94–99.
- Clifford, E. M. (1959). "Review of W.J. Wedlake, 'Excavations at Camerton, Somerset, 1926-1956'". The Antiquaries Journal. 33: 308–309.
- Clifford, E. M. (1960). "H.R. Cox (obituary)". Proceedings of the Cotteswold Naturalists' Field Club. 33 (4): 232.
- Clifford, E. M. (1960). "Miss C.A. Simpson (obituary)". Proceedings of the Cotteswold Naturalists' Field Club. 33 (4): 235.
- Clifford, E. M. (1961). "The Hucclecote Roman Villa". Trans. Bristol Gloucestershire Archaeol. Soc. 80: 42–49.
- Clifford, E. M. (1961). "Quenington, Gloucestershire". Trans. Bristol Gloucestershire Archaeol. Soc. 80: 93–98.
- Clifford, E. M. (1963). "A Burial at Kingscote, Gloucestershire". Trans. Bristol Gloucestershire Archaeol. Soc. 82: 205–207.
- Clifford, E. M. (1963). "Hailes Church". Trans. Bristol Gloucestershire Archaeol. Soc. 82: 208–209.
- Clifford, E. M. (1963). "Palaeolithic Implements from Little Alne, Alcester, Warwickshire (note)". Proceedings of the Prehistoric Society. 29: 429.
- Clifford, E. M. (1964). "Two Finds of Beaker Pottery from Gloucestershire". Trans. Bristol Gloucestershire Archaeol. Soc. 83: 34–39.
- Clifford, E. M. (1964). "Early Iron Age Pottery from Rodborough Common and Duntisbourne Abbots". Trans. Bristol Gloucestershire Archaeol. Soc. 83: 145–146.
- Clifford, E. M. (1964). "An Enclosure on Crickley Hill, Gloucestershire". Trans. Bristol Gloucestershire Archaeol. Soc. 83: 40–48.
- Clifford, E. M. (1965). "The prehistory of Gloucestershire. (Report of the RAI Summer Meeting, Cheltenham, 1965)". The Archaeological Journal. 122: 175–177.
- Clifford, E. M. (1966). "Tumulus near Bownhill Long Barrow". Trans. Bristol Gloucestershire Archaeol. Soc. 85: 214–215.
- Clifford, E. M. (1966). "Hetty Pegler's Tump". Antiquity. 40 (158): 129–132. doi:10.1017/S0003598X00032300.
- Clifford, E. M. (1967). "Skeletons from Gloucester". Trans. Bristol Gloucestershire Archaeol. Soc. 86: 199–199.
- Clifford, E. M. (1967). "Underground Chambers, Miserden (note)". Trans. Bristol Gloucestershire Archaeol. Soc. 86: 200–200.
- Clifford, E. M. (1968). "Professor H.L. Hawkins D.Sc., F.R.S. (obituary)". Proceedings of the Cotteswold Naturalists' Field Club. 35 (3): 151.
- Clifford, Elsie Margaret (1961). Bagendon: A Belgic Oppidum; a Record of the Excavations of 1954-56. Cambridge: W. Heffer & Sons Ltd.
- Cox, M. M.; Clifford, E. M. (1950). A history of the parish of Great Witcombe, Gloucestershire. Witcombe & Bentham W.I.
- Clifford, E. M.; Daniel, G. E. (1940). "The Rodmarton and Avening portholes". Proceedings of the Prehistoric Society. 6: 133–165.
- Clifford, E. M. (1942). "Working oxen at Cirencester". Trans. Bristol Gloucestershire Archaeol. Soc. 63: 168–171.
- Clifford, E. M. (1943). "Palaeolithic Implements from Little Alne, Alcester, Warwickshire". Proceedings of the Prehistoric Society. 9: 52–54.
- Clifford, E. M. (1944). "Graves found at Hailes, Gloucestershire". Trans. Bristol Gloucestershire Archaeol. Soc. 65: 187–198.
- Clifford, E. M. (1947). "Mosaic floor at Cirencester". Trans. Bristol Gloucestershire Archaeol. Soc. 67: 381–395.
- Clifford, Elsie M (1935). "Deep into the Past: the Early History of Man". In H. A. T. Child and Sir Arthur Smith Woodward (ed.). The Earth and Its Peoples. The Modern Home University. London: Odhams Press Ltd. pp. 233–346.
- Clifford, Elsie (October 1937). "Barrows of the New Stone Age: The Drift from the Land". Gloucestershire Countryside. Vol. 3, no. 1. pp. 274–275.
- Clifford, Elsie M. (October 1938). "Shepherds' Cots in the Cotswolds: The Cotswold Stone "Quars"". Gloucestershire Countryside. Vol. 3, no. 5. p. 388.
- Clifford, Elsie M. (July 1937). "Earthworks of the Early Iron Age". Gloucestershire Countryside. Vol. 2, no. 12. pp. 247–249.
- Clifford, Elsie M. (January 1941). "Avening and Rodmarton Long Barrow". Gloucestershire Countryside. Vol. 4, no. 2. pp. 33–34.
- Clifford, Elsie (1950). "The Cotswold Megalithic Culture: The Grave Goods and Their Background". In Cyril Fox and Bruce Dickins (ed.). The Early Cultures of North-West Europe. H. M. Chadwick Memorial Studies. Cambridge: Cambridge University Press. pp. 23–40.
- Clifford, E. M. (1944). "St Briavels". Folklore. 55 (4): 169–170. doi:10.1080/0015587X.1944.9717746.
- Clifford, E. M. (1944). "Cooper's Hill Wake". Folklore. 55 (3): 125–126. doi:10.1080/0015587X.1944.9717734.
- Clifford, Elsie M. (1955). "Some earthworks in Gloucestershire". The Archaeological Newsletter. 5 (8): 154–155.
- Clifford, Elsie M. "Bagendon". Bulletin of the Standing Conference for Local History. 17: 6.
- Clifford, Mrs E.M. (1 February 1958). "The Predecessor of Roman Cirencester discovered: a Belgic capital of the Dobunni excavated at Bagendon". Illustrated London News. Vol. 232, no. 6191. pp. 180–181.
