= National Institute for Preventive Archaeological Research =

French public institution

- Institut national de recherches archéologiques préventives
- Predecessor: Association for National Archaeological Excavations (Afan)
- Formation: February 1, 2002
- Type: Public administrative establishment
- Purpose: Preventive archaeology, archaeological research, education, and cultural outreach
- Headquarters: 121 Rue d'Alésia, Paris, France
- President: Dominique Garcia
- Director General: Daniel Guérin
- Parent organization: Ministry of Culture, Ministry of Higher Education and Research
- Affiliations: CNRS, Europeae Archaeologiae Consilium, European Association of Archaeologists
- Budget: €191 million (2023)
- Staff: Approximately 2,400 (2023)
- Website: www.inrap.fr

The National Institute for Preventive Archaeological Research (Inrap, French: Institut national de recherches archéologiques préventives) is a French public administrative establishment dedicated to archaeological research, created under the law of January 17, 2001, concerning preventive archaeology. It replaced the Association for National Archaeological Excavations (AFAN), a 1901 law association.

Inrap operates under the joint supervision of the French Ministry of Culture and the Ministry of Higher Education and Research.

== History ==
In 1973, the Association for National Archaeological Excavations (AFAN) was established. The Ministry of Culture allocated funds to AFAN, which distributed them between planned and rescue excavations. AFAN negotiated excavation costs among three parties: the state, AFAN, and the developer. Despite increased resources, challenges persisted. AFAN created the national archaeological map, an inventory to assess the archaeological potential of municipalities. In 1977, AFAN established the Emergency Archaeology Intervention Fund (FIAS). That same year, Article R.111-3-2 of the Urban Planning Code allowed the refusal of a building permit if it endangered an archaeological site or remains. In 1979, the Sub-Directorate of Archaeology was created within the Ministry of Culture's Heritage Directorate, recognizing archaeology as an integral part of cultural heritage.

In 1999, following numerous scandals involving the destruction of archaeological sites, the Minister of Culture, Catherine Trautmann, commissioned a working group to propose a new law to protect archaeological heritage from land development. The group included Jean-Paul Demoule, a university professor, Bernard Pêcheur, a state councilor, and Bernard Poignant, mayor of Quimper. On January 7, 2001, the preventive archaeology law was enacted, based on the European Convention on the Protection of the Archaeological Heritage, signed in Malta in January 1992. This law introduced a fee to fund archaeological diagnostics and excavations, dissolved AFAN, and established a public administrative institution with staff employed under public contracts. On February 1, 2002, Inrap was officially founded.

== Missions ==
The law mandates that, before any development project or upon submission of a building permit, the archaeology service of the Regional Directorate for Cultural Affairs may require an archaeological diagnostic if deemed necessary.

Inrap's primary mission is to conduct these preventive archaeology diagnostics. When a land development project is subject to an archaeological prescription by the regional archaeology service—indicating potential or confirmed archaeological significance—a diagnostic is performed before construction begins. This may lead to preventive excavations, assigned through a tender process. Inrap also ensures the scientific exploitation of preventive archaeology operations and disseminates their results. It contributes to education, cultural outreach, and the promotion of archaeology (Article L.523-1 of the French Heritage Code).

Some aspects of archaeological research at Inrap
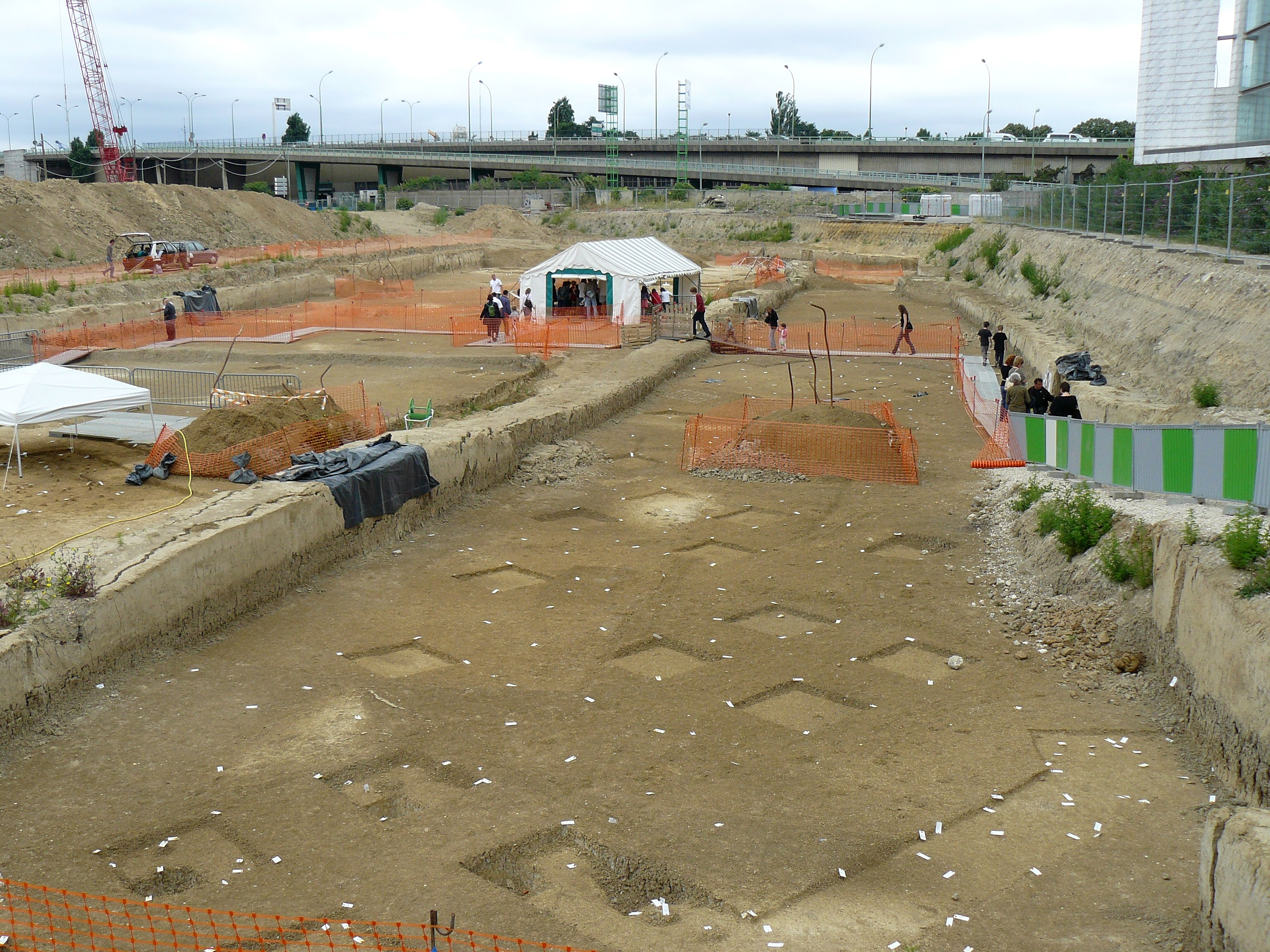
Excavations at an open-air Mesolithic site (Rue Henry-Farman, Paris 15th) in 2008.

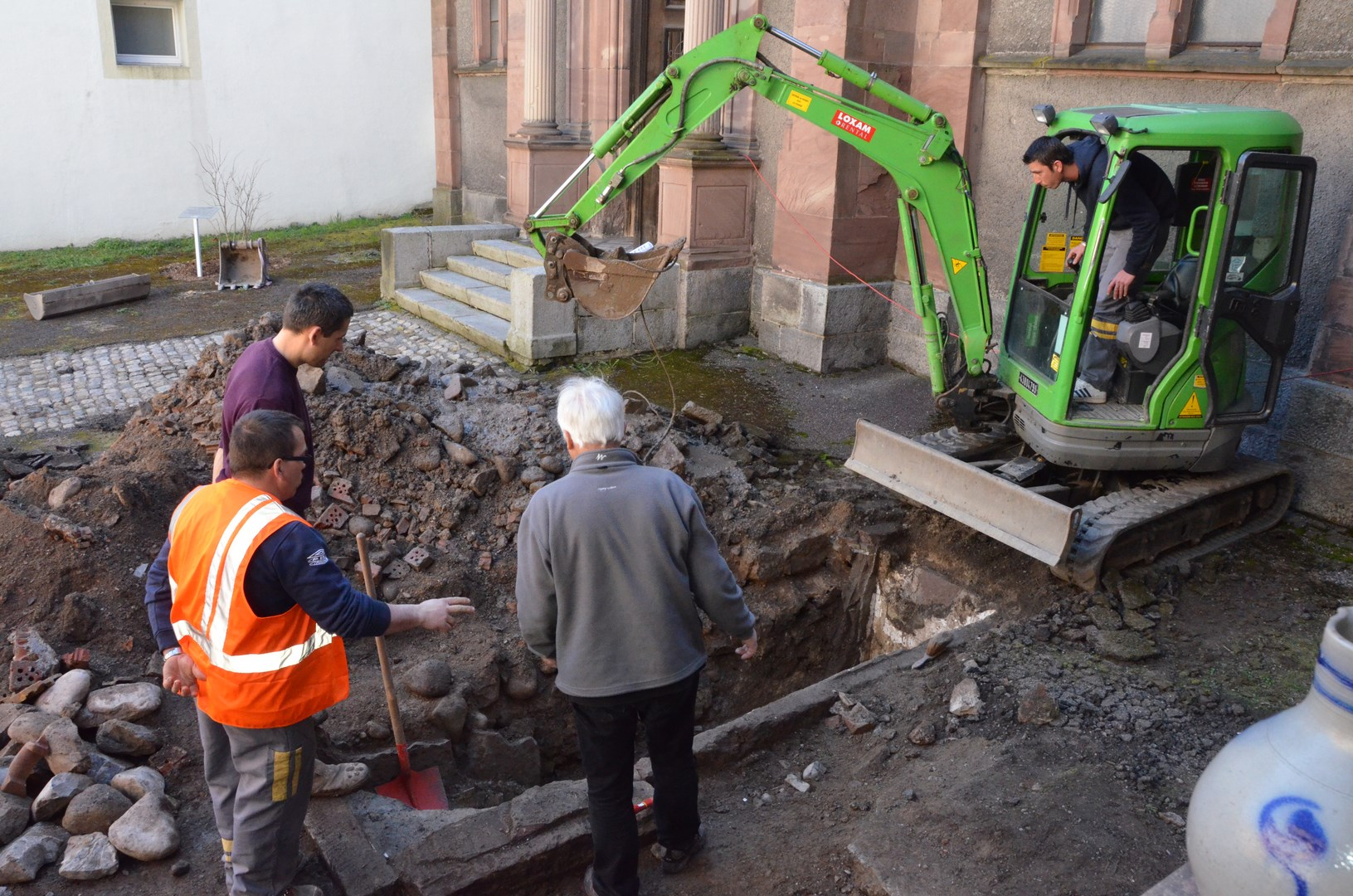
Mechanical excavation in the courtyard of the Thann Synagogue (Haut-Rhin), uncovering a ritual bath in 2014.

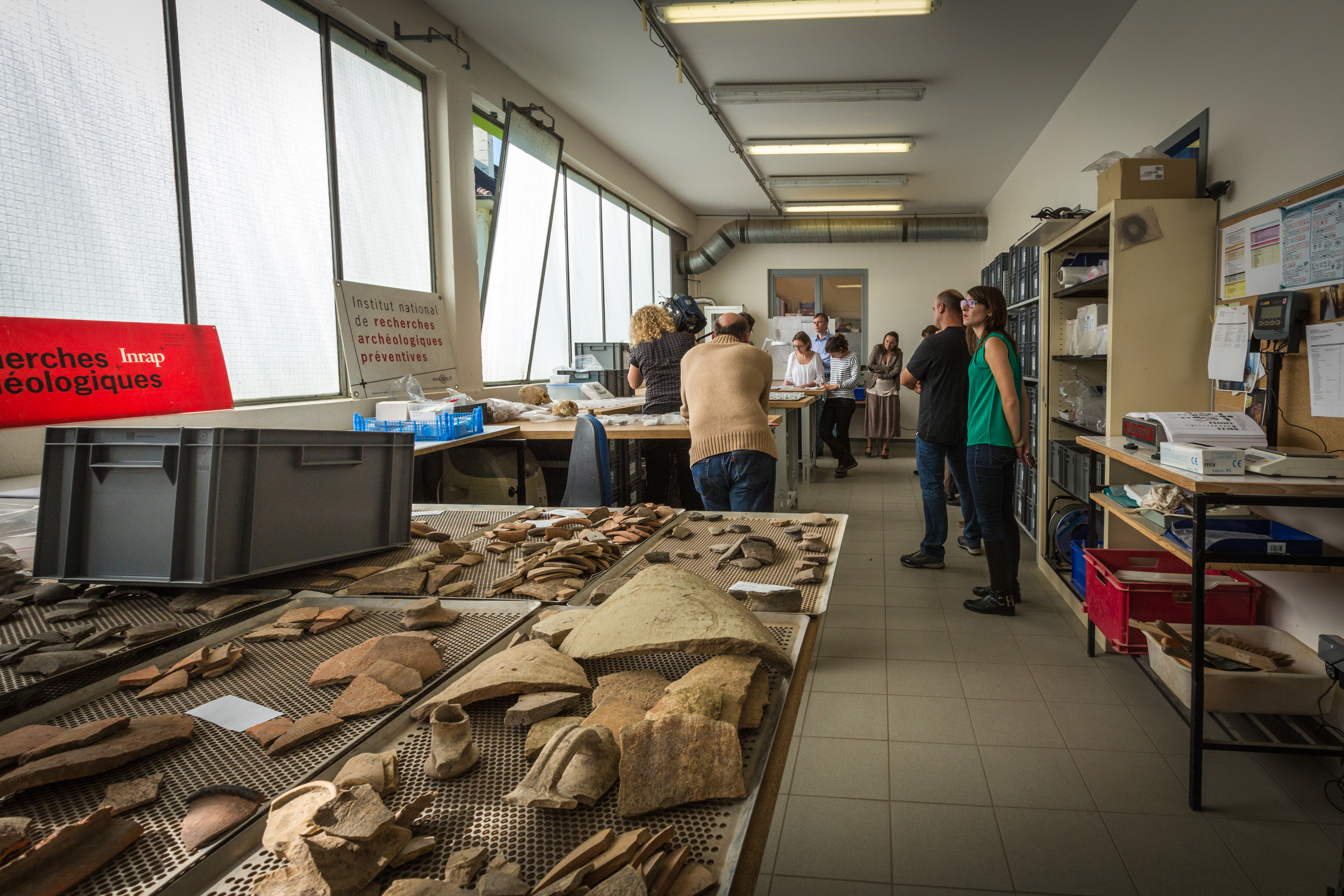
Presentation of artifacts from excavations at Obernai (Bas-Rhin) in 2013.

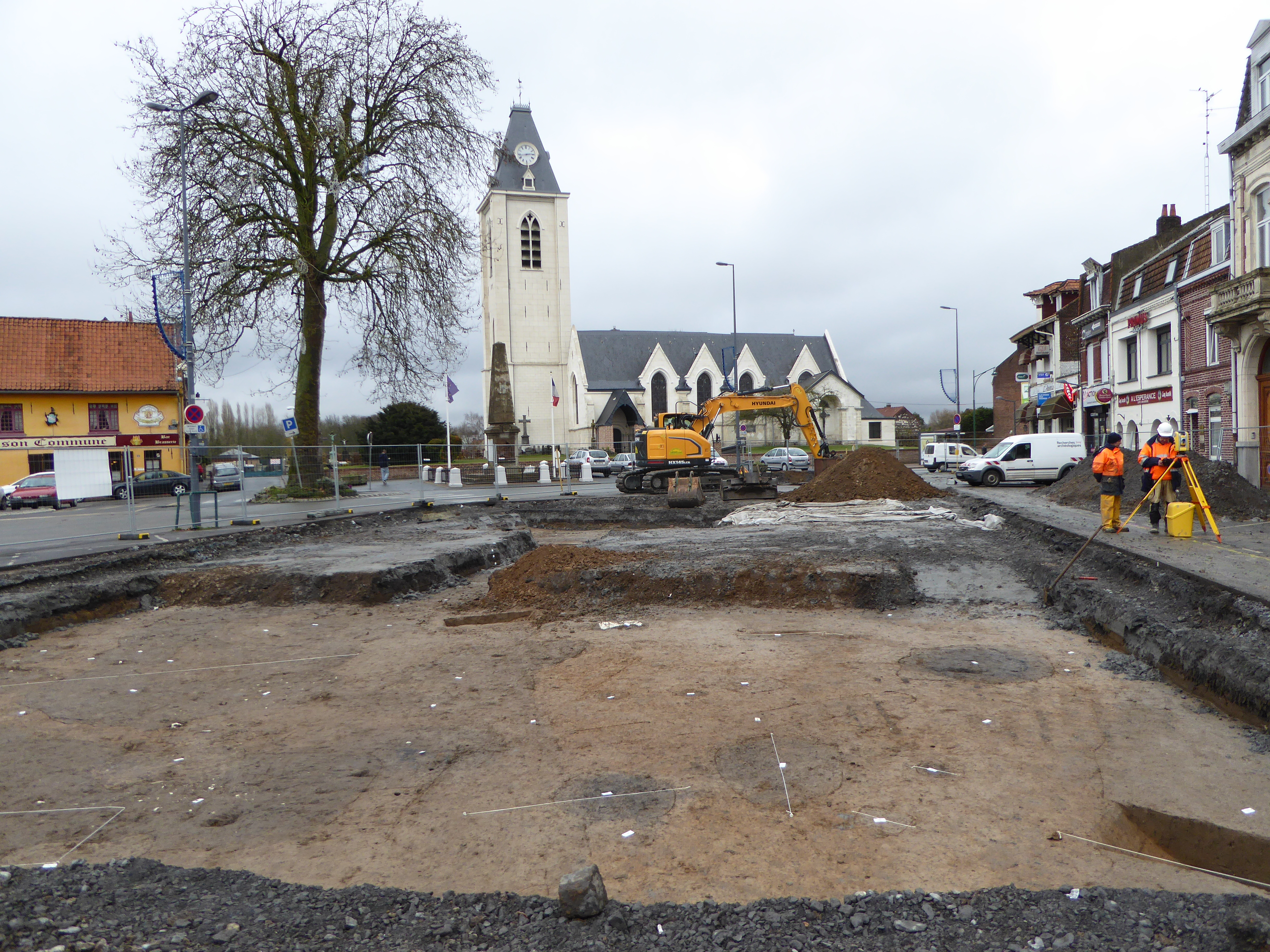
Excavations at an open-air site, Place de la République, Annappes, in 2017.

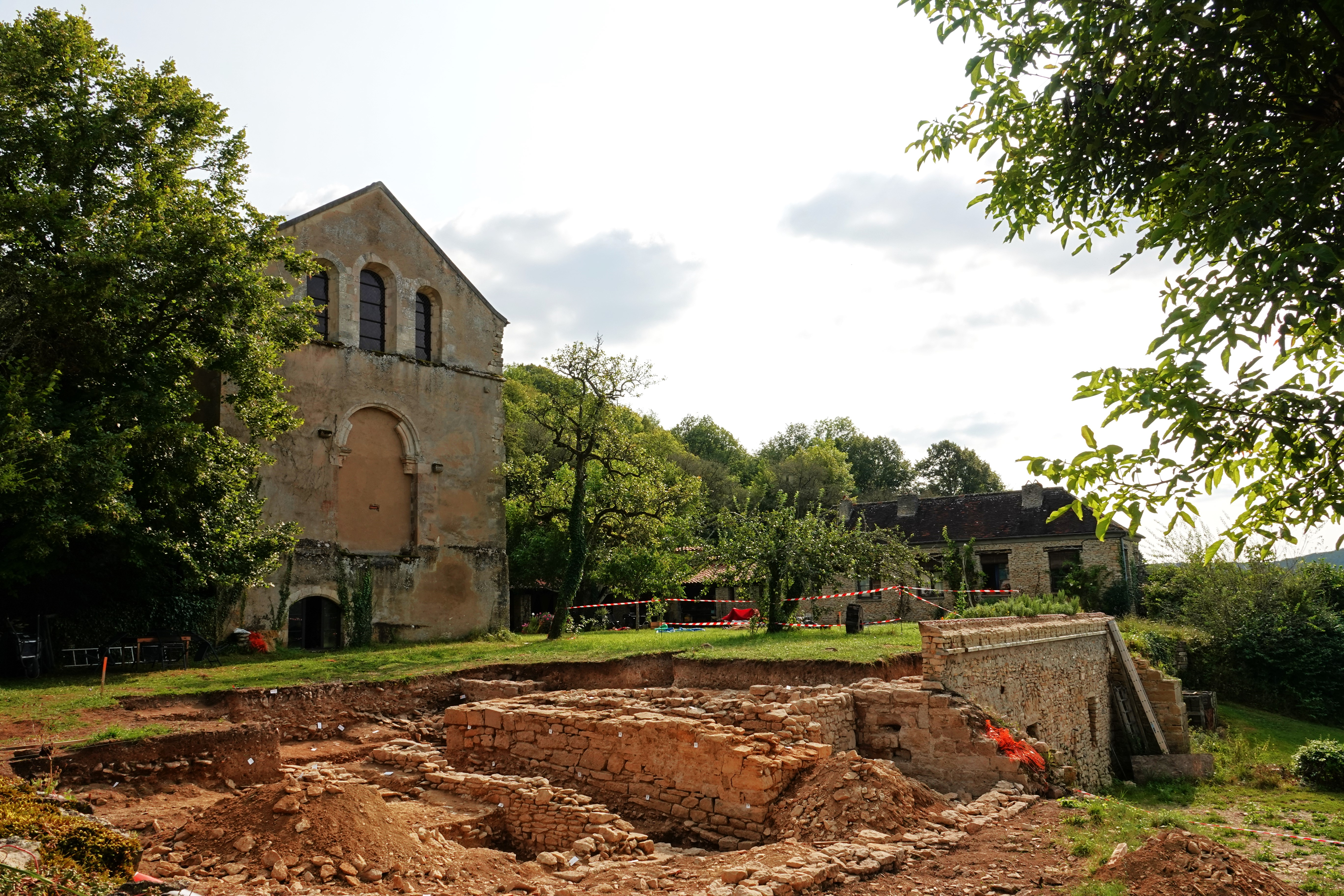
Excavations at La Cordelle site, Vézelay (Yonne), August 2024.

=== Preventive archaeology operations ===
Diagnostics involve mechanically testing approximately 10% of a project's land area to assess archaeological potential. These tests, conducted with mechanical diggers, vary in depth based on the burial level of remains. They aim to confirm or rule out the presence of remains, and if present, to identify their nature, density, extent, and preservation state. A report summarizing the findings is submitted to the Regional Archaeology Service. Excavations are prescribed when remains are deemed significant, occurring before construction starts. Excavations focus on areas with the most important remains to collect and analyze data, providing a comprehensive understanding of the site's evolution. Post-excavation analysis allows archaeologists to interpret field data, culminating in a final operation report, which may serve as the basis for scientific publication.

=== Research ===
Research is central to Inrap's mission. The institute extends its diagnostic and excavation work through research, contributing to international archaeological studies. Inrap's discoveries align with global research themes, and the institute participates in colloquia, seminars, publications, and scientific conferences. It collaborates with French universities, the CNRS, and international partners, including the Europeae Archaeologiae Consilium, the European Association of Archaeologists, and European projects like Planarch and NEARCH.

=== Outreach ===
Under the January 17, 2001 law, Inrap is tasked with the "scientific exploitation of preventive archaeology operations and the dissemination of their results," contributing to education, cultural outreach, and archaeology promotion (Article L.523-1 of the Heritage Code). Inrap undertakes various public engagement activities:

- Open excavation site days provide public access with guided tours by Inrap archaeologists, informational leaflets, and activities showcasing archaeology's methods and professions.
- Lightweight Inrap exhibitions are loaned to partner cultural institutions for events or exhibitions related to archaeology.
- Inrap publishes and co-publishes books on archaeology for the general public, including adults and young audiences.
- The institute participates in major national cultural and scientific events, such as Fête de la Science, European Museum Night, and European Heritage Days.
- Since 2010, Inrap, in collaboration with Arte, has organized the National Archaeology Days (JNA) under the Ministry of Culture's auspices, promoting archaeology, its stakes, professions, tools, and disciplines nationwide.

== Funding ==
Since the law of August 1, 2003, preventive archaeology operations are funded through two mechanisms:

- The Preventive Archaeology Fee (RAP), payable by anyone planning subsoil-affecting development works subject to specific declarations or authorizations under the Urban Planning Code or Environmental Code, above a threshold tied to the project's nature.
- Excavation costs, paid by the developer directly to the operator (Inrap, an approved территориал archaeology service, or another state-approved entity) for conducting excavations.

== Organization ==
Inrap is governed by a board of directors, assisted by a scientific council. Members of both councils are appointed or elected for three-year terms, with a limit of two consecutive terms. Both councils are chaired by Inrap's president, selected for archaeological expertise and appointed by a presidential decree upon the joint proposal of the Ministers of Culture and Research. The president is supported by a deputy director general, responsible for administration and management, appointed by interministerial order.

=== Board of directors ===
The board includes the president, seven state representatives, two representatives from research and higher education institutions, two from territorial authorities, two from public or private entities involved in preventive archaeology, four elected Inrap staff members, and four qualified archaeology experts.

The state representatives are the secretary general of the Ministry of Culture, the director general of heritage, the director of research at the Ministry of Research, the director of higher education, the budget director, the director general of urban planning, housing, and construction, and a regional archaeology curator designated by the Minister of Culture. Research and higher education representatives include the director general of the CNRS and the first vice-president of the Conference of University Presidents. Territorial authority and public/private entity representatives are jointly appointed by the Ministers of Culture and Research. The four qualified experts are appointed similarly. Non-voting attendees include Inrap's director general, scientific and technical director, financial controller, and accounting officer.

=== Scientific council ===
The scientific council comprises the Inrap president, the vice-president of the National Archaeological Research Council, seven elected members from scientific archaeology roles (two from higher education, two from research institutions, one from territorial archaeology services, and two from Ministry of Culture regional archaeology staff), four experts in preventive archaeology (two appointed by each minister), and five elected Inrap scientific and technical staff members.

=== Presidents ===
- Jean-Paul Demoule, 2001–2008.
- Jean-Paul Jacob, 2008–2014.
- Dominique Garcia, 2014–present (reappointed in 2017, 2020, and 2024).

== See also ==
- Rescue archaeology
- Underwater archaeology
- Ministry of Culture (France)
- CNRS

== Bibliography ==
- Chapelot, Jean (2010). 30 ans d'archéologie médiévale en France [30 Years of Medieval Archaeology in France] (in French). Caen: Publications du CRAHM. ISBN 978-2-902685-72-1.
- Gaillard, Yann (2005). Rapport d'information sur l'Institut national de recherches archéologiques préventives, INRAP [Information Report on the National Institute for Preventive Archaeological Research, INRAP] (in French). Paris: Sénat, Commission des finances. ISBN 2-11-113086-9.
- Négri, Vincent (2002). "Le statut juridique de l'archéologie préventive en France" [The Legal Status of Preventive Archaeology in France]. Le projet Planarch. Archéologie et aménagement du territoire [The Planarch Project: Archaeology and Land Use Planning] (in French). Wavre: Éditions Mardaga. pp. 42–44. ISBN 978-2-87009-830-1.
- Inrap (2012). "Nouveaux champs de la recherche archéologique : Inrap 10 ans" [New Fields of Archaeological Research: Inrap 10 Years] (PDF). Archéopages (in French) (Special issue). Paris: Inrap.
- Pot, Nicole (2009). "L'Inrap, une construction difficile et mouvementée". La fabrique de l'archéologie en France [Inrap, a Difficult and Eventful Construction] (in French). Paris: La Découverte. pp. 266–280. ISBN 978-2-7071-5882-6.
- Sauvant, Pascale (2010). "La littérature grise à l'Inrap" [Grey Literature at Inrap]. Travaux de la Maison René-Ginouvès [Works by René Ginouvès] (in French). Vol. 11. Paris: Maison René-Ginouvès. ISBN 978-2-7018-0289-3.
- Demoule, Jean-Paul (2020). Aux origines, l'archéologie : une science au cœur des grands débats de notre temps [At the Origins, Archaeology: A Science at the Heart of Our Time's Major Debates] (in French). Paris: La Découverte. ISBN 978-2-7071-9992-8.
- Garcia, Dominique (2021). La Fabrique de la France [The Making of France] (in French). Paris: Flammarion. ISBN 978-2-08-151954-1.
- Barthélémy, Pierre (2022a). "Archéologie : à 20 ans, l'Inrap entre dans l'âge adulte" [Ar daylight archaeology: At 20, Inrap Comes of Age]. Le Monde (in French).
