= Lattara =

Coordinates: 43°34′05″N 3°54′12″E

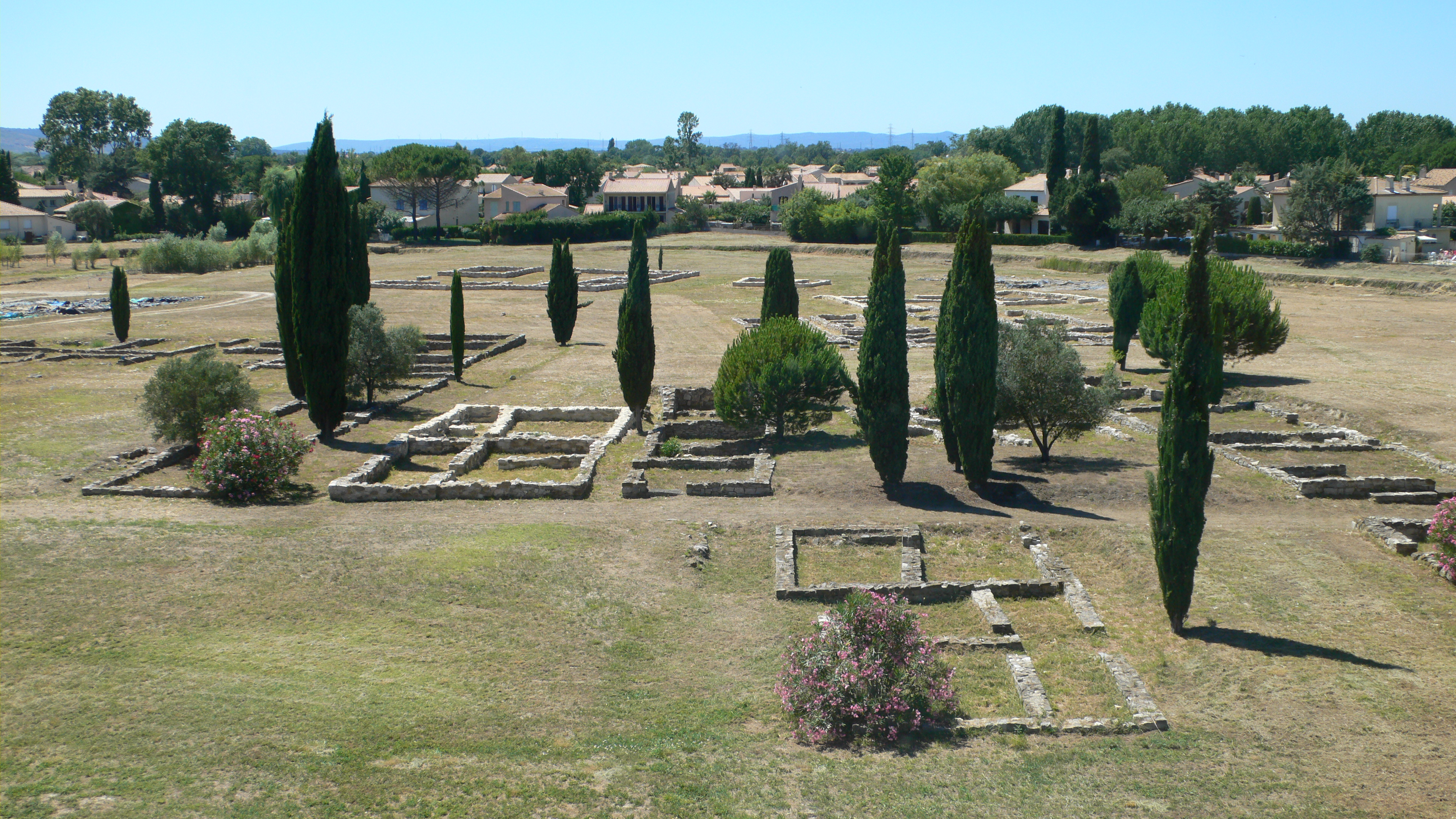
Archaeological site

Lattara is an ancient Etruscan port city in southern France, mentioned by many Roman authors and discovered in 1963. The site is now home to the Musée Archéologique Henri Prades.

Roman-era remains of a gray whale, now an extinct species in the North Atlantic, have been found here.

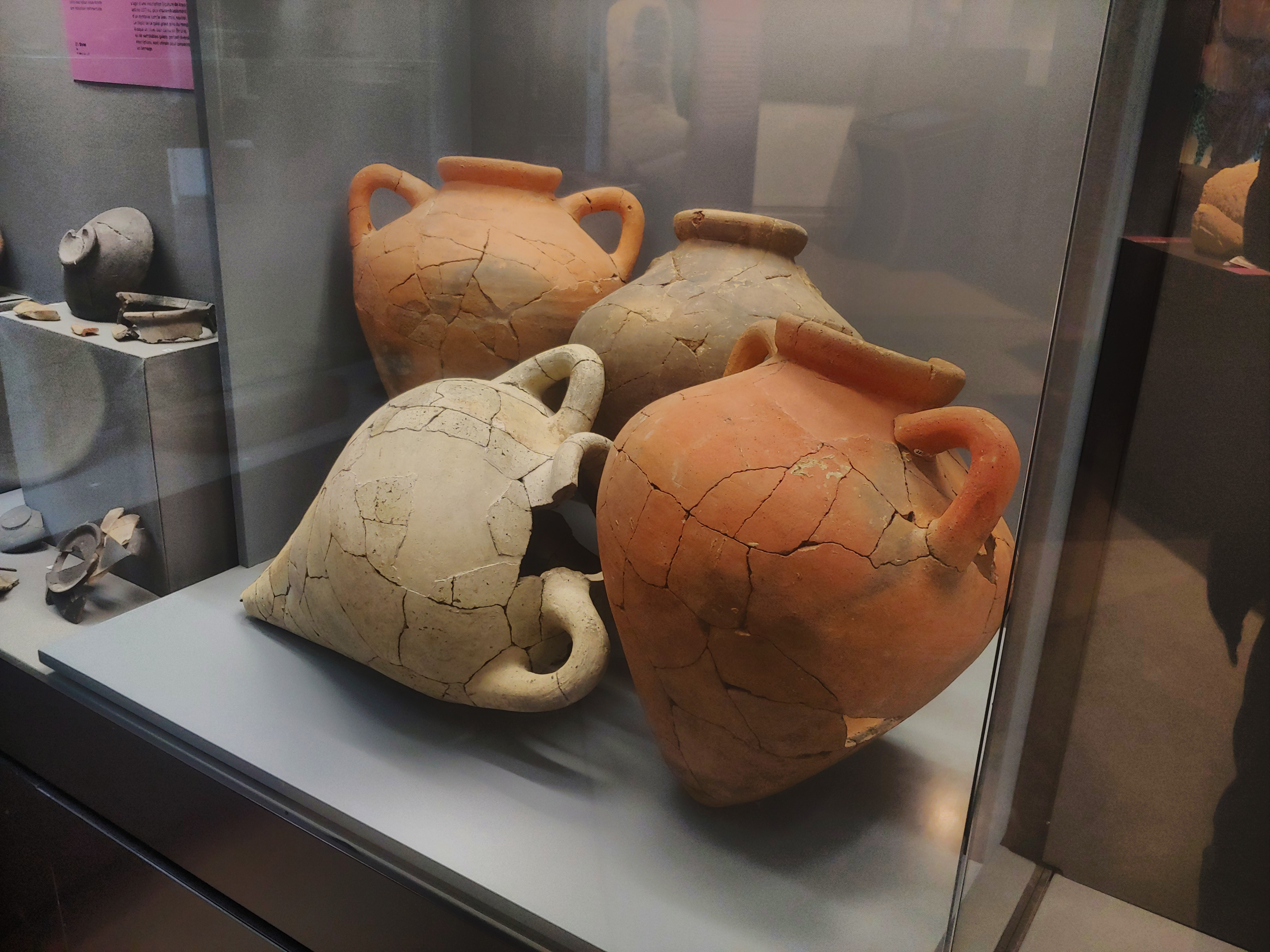
Gallic ceramics in Lattara.

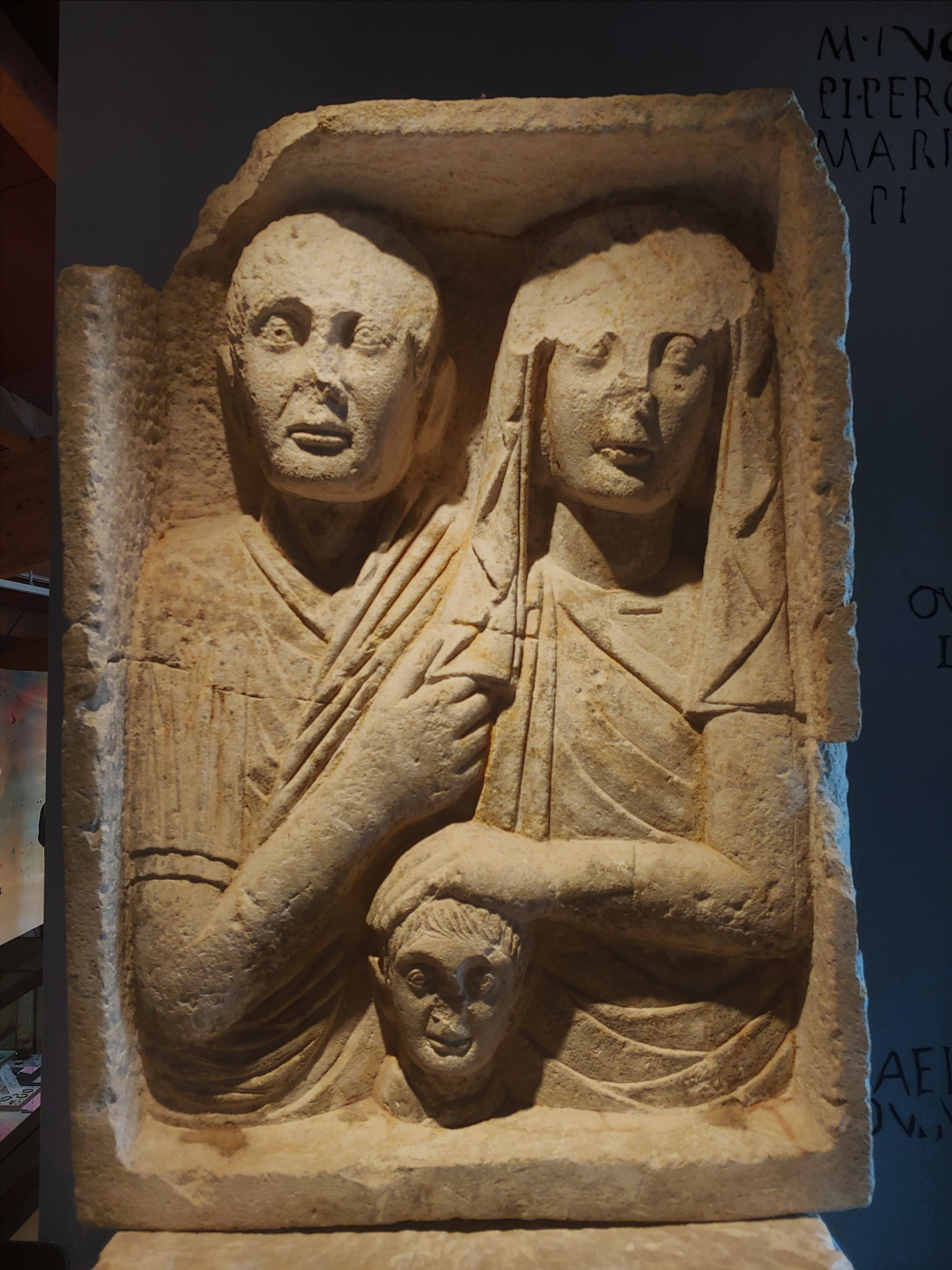
Gallo Roman funerary stele

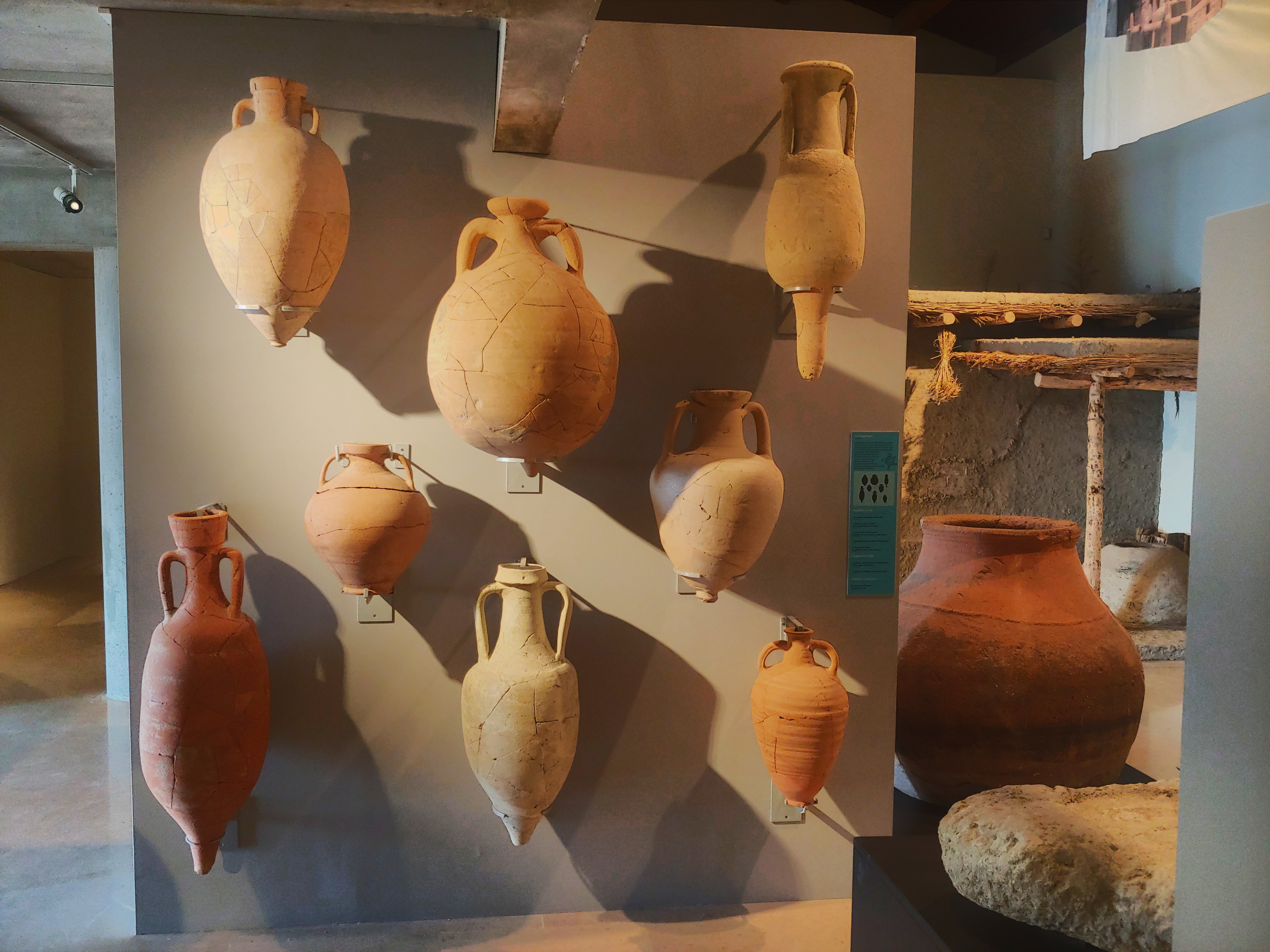
Amphorae discovered at Lattara

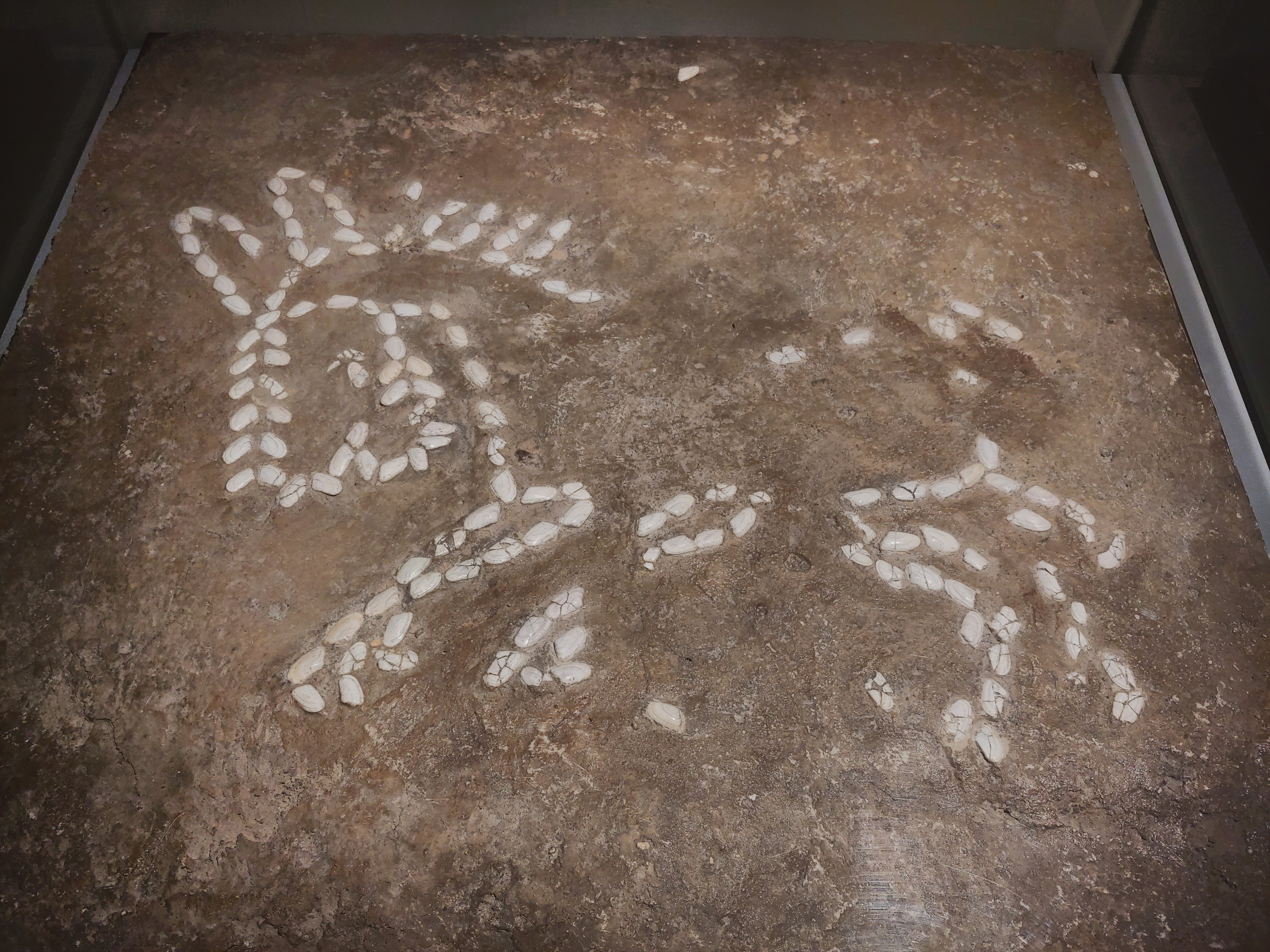
Gallic decor made with shells.

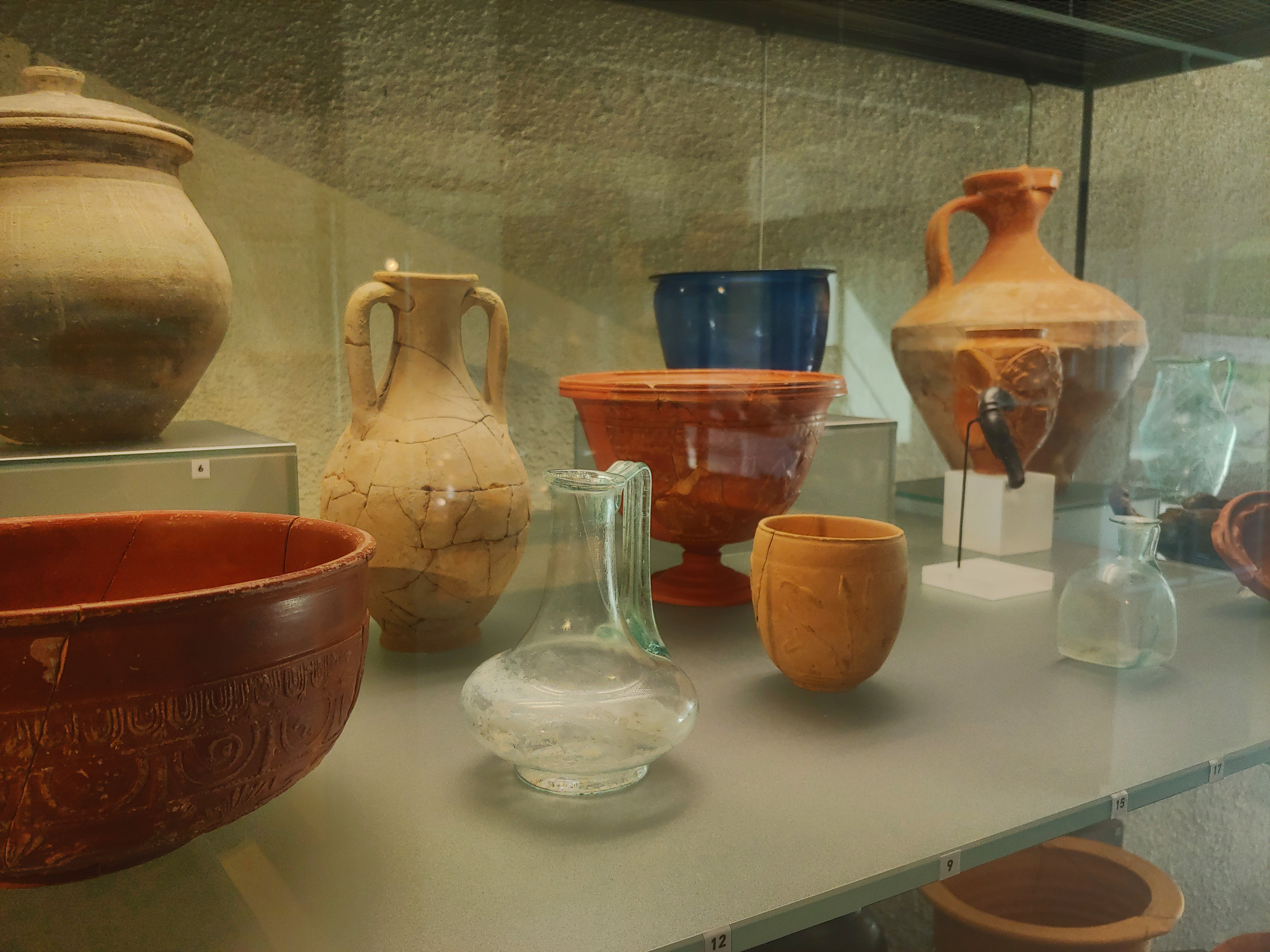
Gallic Flasks.

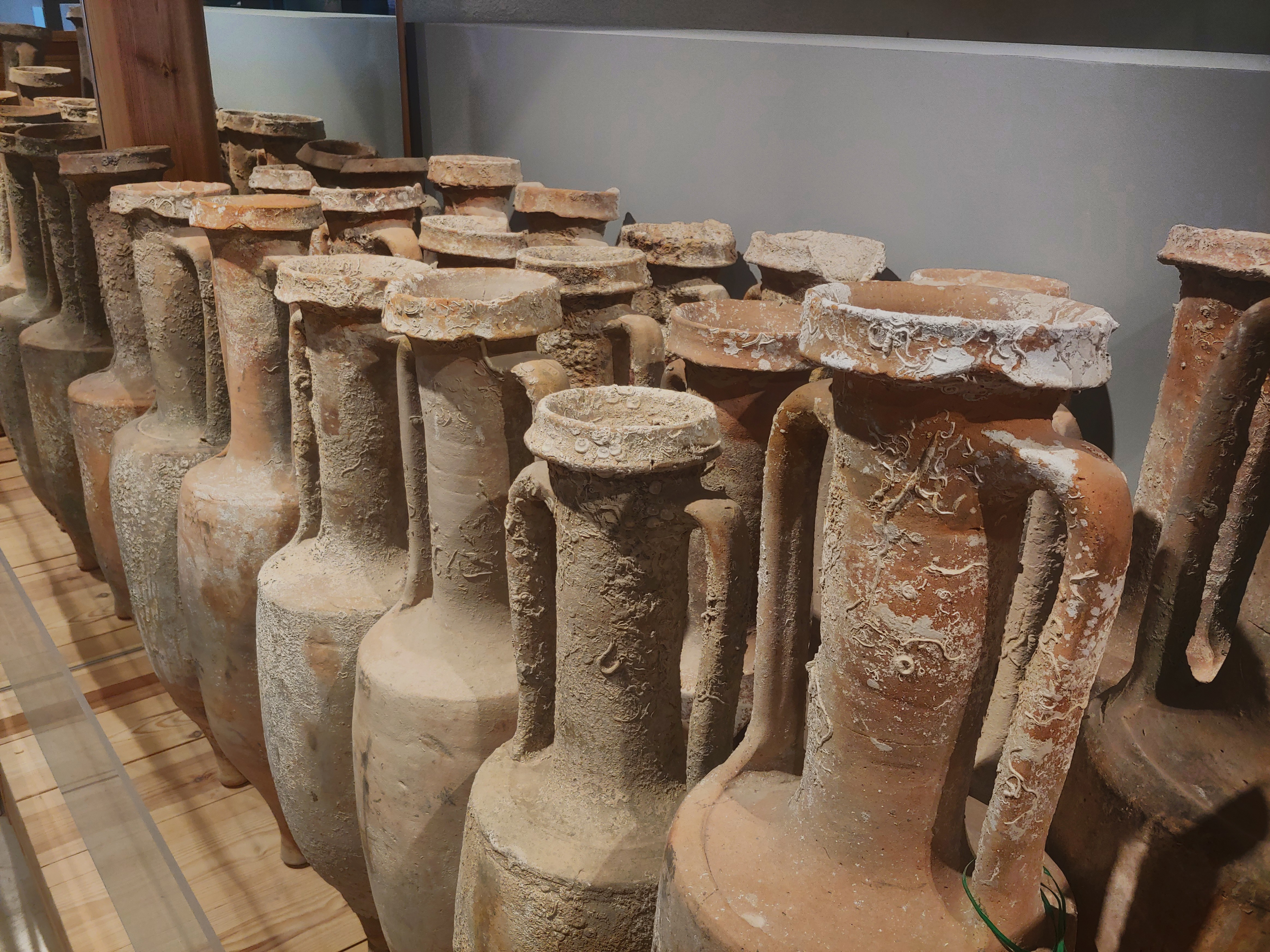
Amphorae in Lattara.
