= College of Pontiffs =

High priests of ancient Rome

The College of Pontiffs (Latin: Collegium Pontificum; see collegium) was a body of the ancient Roman state whose members were the highest-ranking priests of the state religion. The college consisted of the pontifex maximus and the other pontifices, the rex sacrorum, the fifteen flamens, and the Vestals. The College of Pontiffs was one of the four major priestly colleges; originally their responsibility was limited to supervising both public and private sacrifices, but as time passed their responsibilities increased. The other colleges were the augures (who read omens), the quindecimviri sacris faciundis ("fifteen men who carry out the rites"), and the epulones (who set up feasts at festivals).

The title pontifex comes from the Latin for "bridge builder", a possible allusion to a very early role in placating the gods and spirits associated with the Tiber River, for instance. Also, Varro cites this position as meaning "able to do".

The pontifex maximus was the most important member of the college. Until 104 BC, the pontifex maximus held the sole power in appointing members to the other priesthoods in the college.

The flamens were priests in charge of fifteen official cults of Roman religion, each assigned to a particular god. The three major flamens (flamines maiores) were the flamen Dialis, the high priest of Jupiter; the flamen Martialis, who cultivated Mars; and the flamen Quirinalis, devoted to Quirinus. The deities cultivated by the twelve flamines minores were Carmenta, Ceres, Falacer, Flora, Furrina, Palatua, Pomona, Portunus, Volcanus (Vulcan), Volturnus, and two whose names are lost.

The Vestal Virgins were the only female members of the college. They were in charge of guarding Rome's sacred hearth, keeping the flame burning inside the Temple of Vesta. Around age 6 to 10, girls were chosen for this position and were required to perform the rites and obligations for 30 years, including remaining chaste.

== Membership ==
Membership in the various colleges of priests, including the College of Pontiffs, was usually an honor offered to members of politically powerful or wealthy families. Membership was for life, except for the Vestal Virgins whose term was 30 years. In the early Republic, only patricians could become priests. However, the Lex Ogulnia in 300 BC granted the right to become pontifices and augures to plebeians. Nevertheless, even in the late Republic it was still believed that the auspices ultimately resided with patrician magistrates, and certain ancient priesthoods: the Dialis, Martialis and Quirinalis flamines, and the college of the Salii were never opened to the plebeians.

The number of members in the College of Pontiffs grew over time. Originally consisting of three members, the number was increased to nine by the third century BC; Sulla increased the number to fifteen; Augustus increased the number even further, perhaps to as many as twenty-five.

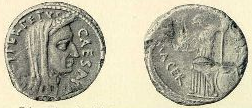
Denarius depicting Julius Caesar as pontifex maximus

Until the 3rd century BC, the College elected the pontifex maximus from their own number. The right of the college to elect their own pontifex maximus was returned, but the circumstances surrounding this are unclear. This changed again after Sulla, when in response to his reforms, the election of the pontifex maximus was once again placed in the hands of an assembly of seventeen of the twenty-five tribes. However, the College still controlled which candidates the assembly voted on. During the Empire, the office was publicly elected from the candidates of existing pontiffs, until the Emperors began to automatically assume the title, following Julius Caesar’s example. The pontifex maximus was a powerful political position to hold and the candidates for office were often very active political members of the College. Many, such as Julius Caesar, went on to hold consulships during their time as pontifex maximus.

However, after 44 BC the pontiffs, as with the other official priests of Rome, lost their political influence. Martha Hoffman Lewis could only find four instances where the pontiff's advice was asked: before Augustus' marriage to Livia; in 37 BC when they ordered the removal of the body of one of the proscribed from the Campus; they made expiatory sacrifices on the day the emperor Claudius married Agrippina; and their advice was sought concerning reforms of the discipline of the haruspices.

== Role in the Roman State ==
During the Kingdom of Roman history, the pontiffs were primarily concilia (advisers) of the kings, but after the expulsion of the last Roman King in 510 BC, the College of Pontiffs became religious advisers to the Roman Senate. As the most important of the four priestly colleges, the College of Pontiffs’ duties involved advising the Senate on issues pertaining to the gods, the supervision of the calendar and thus the supervision of ceremonies with their specific rituals, and the appeasement of the gods upon the appearance of prodigies.

One of their most important duties was their guardianship of the libri pontificales (pontifical books). Among these were the acta, indigitamenta (lists of invocations or names of deities), ritualia, commentarii, fasti, and annales (yearly records of magistrates and important events). These items were under the sole possession of the College of Pontiffs and only they were allowed to consult these items when necessary.

The Lex Acilia de intercalando bestowed power on the College to manage the calendar. Thus, they determined the days which religious and political meetings could be held, when sacrifices could be offered, votes cast, and senatorial decisions brought forth.

The College of Pontiffs came to occupy the Regia (the old palace of the kings) during the early Republican period. They came to replace the religious authority that was once held by the king. A position, the rex sacrorum, was even created to replace the king for purposes of religious ceremonies.

When Christianity became the official religion of the Roman Empire, Pope Leo I began using the title pontifex maximus around 440 to emphasize the authority of the pope. The term "chief priests" in the New Testament (e.g. Mark 15:11) is translated as Pontifices in the Latin Vulgate and "high priest" as Pontifex in Hebrews 2:17.

== Pontifex minor ==
The pontiffs were assisted by pontifical clerks or scribes (scribae), a position known in the earlier Republican period as a scriba pontificius but by the Augustan period as a pontifex minor. A pontifex minor assisted at the rite (res divina) for Juno performed each Kalends, the first day of the month. He took up a position in the Curia Calabra, a sacred precinct (templum) on the Capitoline Hill, to observe the new moon.

== Sources ==
- Beard, Mary. "Roman Priesthoods", in Civilization of the Ancient Mediterranean: Greece and Rome. 3 vols. New York: Scribner's, 1988.
- Dionysius of Halicarnassus, Roman Antiquities II. p. lxxiii. Loeb Classical Library, Harvard University Press, Cambridge Massachusetts.
- Szemler, G.J., The Priests of the Republic: A Study of the Interactions between Priesthoods and Magistracies. Collection Latomus. 127 (1972)
