= Rex Sacrorum =

Ancient Roman religious office

In ancient Roman religion, the rex sacrorum ("king of the sacred things", also sometimes rex sacrificulus) was a senatorial priesthood reserved for patricians. Although in the historical era, the pontifex maximus was the head of Roman state religion, Festus says that in the ranking of the highest Roman priests (ordo sacerdotum), the rex sacrorum was of highest prestige, followed by the flamines maiores (Flamen Dialis, Flamen Martialis, Flamen Quirinalis) and the pontifex maximus. The rex sacrorum was based in the Regia.

== Description ==
During the Roman Republic, the rex sacrorum was chosen by the pontifex maximus from a list of patricians submitted by the College of Pontiffs. A further requirement was that he be born from parents married through the ritual of confarreatio, which was also the form of marriage he himself had to enter. His wife, the regina sacrorum, also performed religious duties specific to her role. Marriage was thus such a fundamental part of the priesthood that if the regina died, the rex had to resign. The rex sacrorum was above the pontifex maximus, although he was more or less a powerless figurehead.

The rex sacrorum wore a toga, the undecorated soft "shoeboot" (calceus), and carried a ceremonial axe; as a priest of archaic Roman religion, he sacrificed capite velato, with head covered. The rex held a sacrifice on the Kalends of each month. On the Nones, he announced the dates of festivals for the month. On March 24 and May 24, he held a sacrifice in the Comitium. In addition to these duties the rex sacrorum seems to have functioned as the high priest of Janus.

The rex sacrorum was a feature of Italic religion and possibly also Etruscan. The title is found in Latin cities such as Lanuvium, Tusculum, and Velitrae. At Rome the priesthood was deliberately depoliticized; the rex sacrorum was not elected, and his inauguration was merely witnessed by a comitia calata, an assembly called for the purpose. Like the flamen Dialis but in contrast to the pontiffs and augurs, the rex was barred from a political and military career. After the overthrow of the kings of Rome, the office of rex sacrorum fulfilled at least some of the sacral duties of kingship, with the consuls assuming political power and military command, as well as some sacral functions. It is a matter of scholarly debate as to whether the rex sacrorum was a "decayed king" and it's discussed if this figure was created during the formation of the Republic, as Arnaldo Momigliano argued, or had existed in the Regal period.

== Regina sacrorum ==
As the wife of the rex sacrorum, the regina sacrorum ("queen of the sacred things") was a high priestess who carried out ritual duties only she could perform. On the Kalends of every month, the regina presided at the sacrifice of a sow (porca) or female lamb (agna) to Juno. The highly public nature of these sacrifices, like the role of the Vestals in official Roman religion, contradicts the commonplace notion that women's religious activities in ancient Rome were restricted to the private or domestic sphere. Unlike the Vestals, however, the regina sacrorum and the flaminica Dialis (the wife of the flamen Dialis or high priest of Jupiter) were complements to a male partner; these two priesthoods were gender-balanced and had shared duties.

While performing her rituals, the regina wore a headdress called the arculum, formed from a garland of pomegranate twigs tied up with a white woolen thread. The rex and regina sacrorum were required to marry by the ritual of confarreatio, originally reserved for patricians, but after the Lex Canuleia of 445 BC, it is possible that the regina could have been plebeian.

Inscriptions record the names of a few reginae sacrorum, including Sergia Paullina, the wife of Cn. Pinarius Cornelius Severus, shortly before 112 AD, and Manlia Fadilla around the 2nd/3rd century AD.

== Decline and later use ==
The office of rex sacrorum was not a highly coveted position among the patricians, for although the rex sacrorum was technically superior to the pontiffs, the rank conferred no real political gain. Because of this there would be some years without a rex sacrorum at all. By the time of Antony's civil war the office was entirely in disuse, but seems to have been revived later by Augustus as there was mention of it during the empire until it was probably abolished by Theodosius I.

== In popular culture ==
- "The King of Sacrifices" by John Maddox Roberts appears in The Mammoth Book of Historical Detectives, edited by Michael Ashley. (Carroll & Graf Publishers, 1995) ISBN 0-7867-0214-1

== See also ==
- Agonalia
- Archon basileus, a similar office from ancient Greece.
- Rex Nemorensis, another Roman priest given the title "king".
