= Flamen Divi Julii =

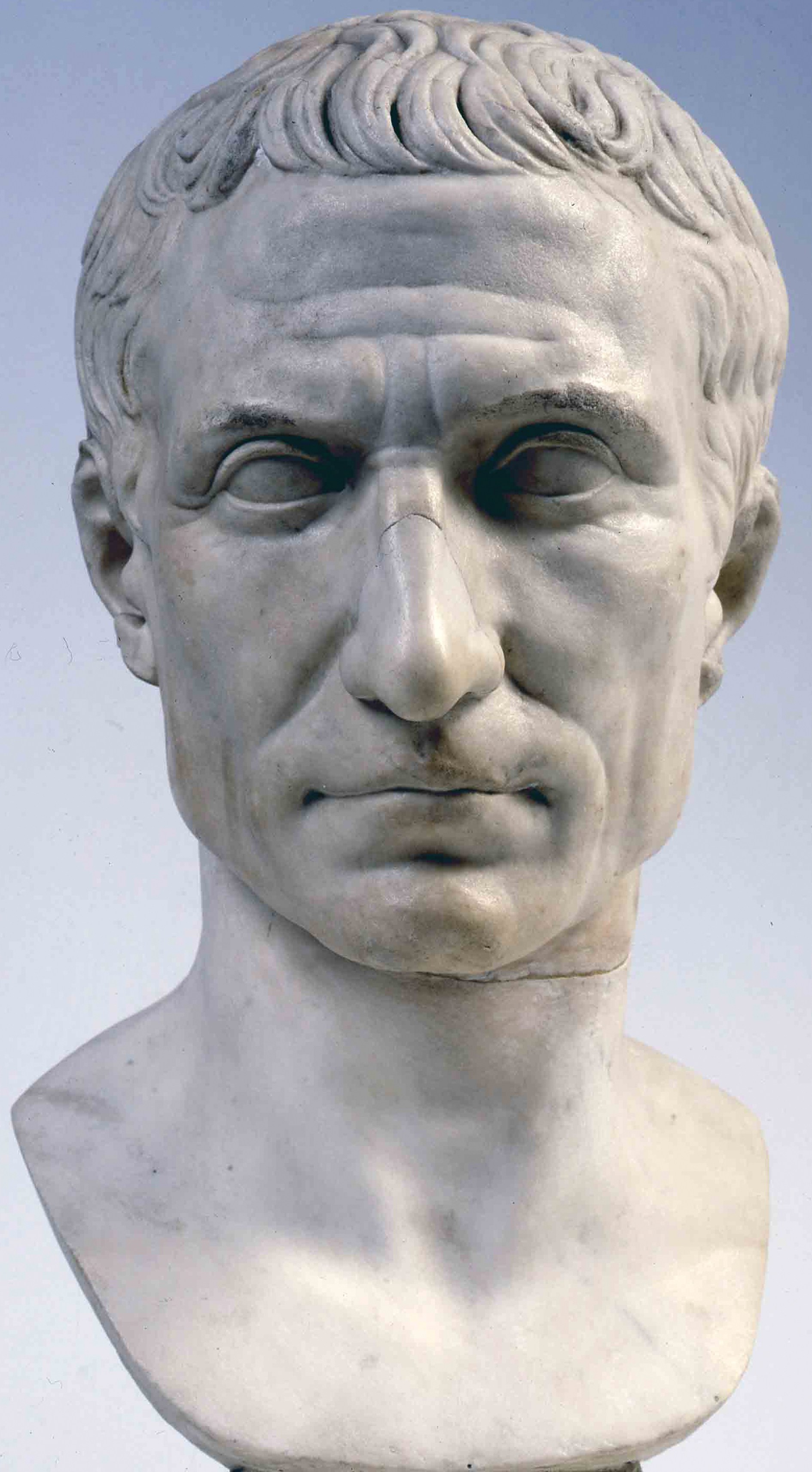
Bust of Julius Caesar, posthumous portrait in marble, 44–30 BC, Museo Pio-Clementino, Vatican Museums

In Roman Imperial cult, the flamen Divi Julii or flamen Divi Iulii, was the priest of the divinised Julius Caesar, and the fourth of the so-called flamines maiores (the archpriests of the Roman flaminates) to be created. The new flaminate was established by the Roman Senate in 42 BC, as part of Caesar's consecration as a divus (divinity of the Roman State) two years after his assassination. Caesar had, in his lifetime, been the recipient of an unofficial divine cult from his supporters, and had designated Mark Antony to serve as his priest. Caesar's cult continued after his death, and in 40 BC, the senate confirmed Antony as the first flamen Divi Iulii.

== Origin and attributes of the office ==
In early 44 BC the Senate had decided that Caesar would be made a god of the Roman state, under the name and title of Divus Iulius. During the same session the inauguration of the respective priestly office was also decreed and Mark Antony was designated as the first flamen Divi Iulii. The original rationale for the creation of a new flamen maior can be found in early Roman history, when legendary king Numa fathered the third great flamen, the flamen Quirinalis, archpriest of Quirinus, a god of the Roman state who was later identified as the deified Romulus. Julius Caesar identified himself as a "re-founder" of Rome, a descendant of Romulus, the god Mars and, by way of the Trojan hero Aeneas, a descendant of Venus. Romulus' legendary successor, Numa, set a precedent for Caesar to appoint his own flamen maior to serve his cult after his planned apotheosis.

== Office holders in the city of Rome ==
=== Mark Antony ===
In his function as pontifex maximus, Julius Caesar himself had chosen his friend and ally Mark Antony for the office, using the ritual of captio (sacred capture). He could not designate his nephew Octavian, because Octavian was his intended political heir. Mark Antony was a close confidant, and a near relative through his mother Iulia, but he was also a plebeian. He had been an augur since 50 BC, and later magister of the newly established luperci Iulii but he had to be elevated to patrician status, and married in a confarreato ceremony, before he could use his augurate on Caesar's behalf as flamen maior. After the peace conference and negotiations at Brindisi in October 40 BC Mark Antony was officially recognised as flamen Divi Iulii by Octavian and Lepidus, Antony's co-rulers in the so-called Second Triumvirate.

=== Sextus Apuleius ===
After Antony's death the position of flamen Divi Iulii in the city of Rome was assumed by a Sextus Apuleius, perhaps the urban praetor of the same name, or more probably his son; the latter had served with Octavian as consul in 29 BC (and therefore held an augurate), and was promoted to patrician status in that year. He might have been inaugurated before the consecration of Augustus's Ara Pacis Augusteae in 13 BC; some modern scholars speculate that he is portrayed as one of the four flamines maiores on its southern frieze.

=== Lucius Iunius Silanus Torquatus ===
For urban Rome only one other flamen Divi Iulii is known, namely Lucius Iunius Silanus Torquatus. He was related to the imperial family, was made a patrician in AD 29 and was elected flamen under emperor Claudius, most probably around AD 41. His official title is given as flamen Divi Iuli et Augusti; the separate offices of flamen Divi Iulii and flamen Divi Augusti were united some time after Augustus' death in AD 14, probably under Tiberius.

== Municipal and provincial priesthoods ==
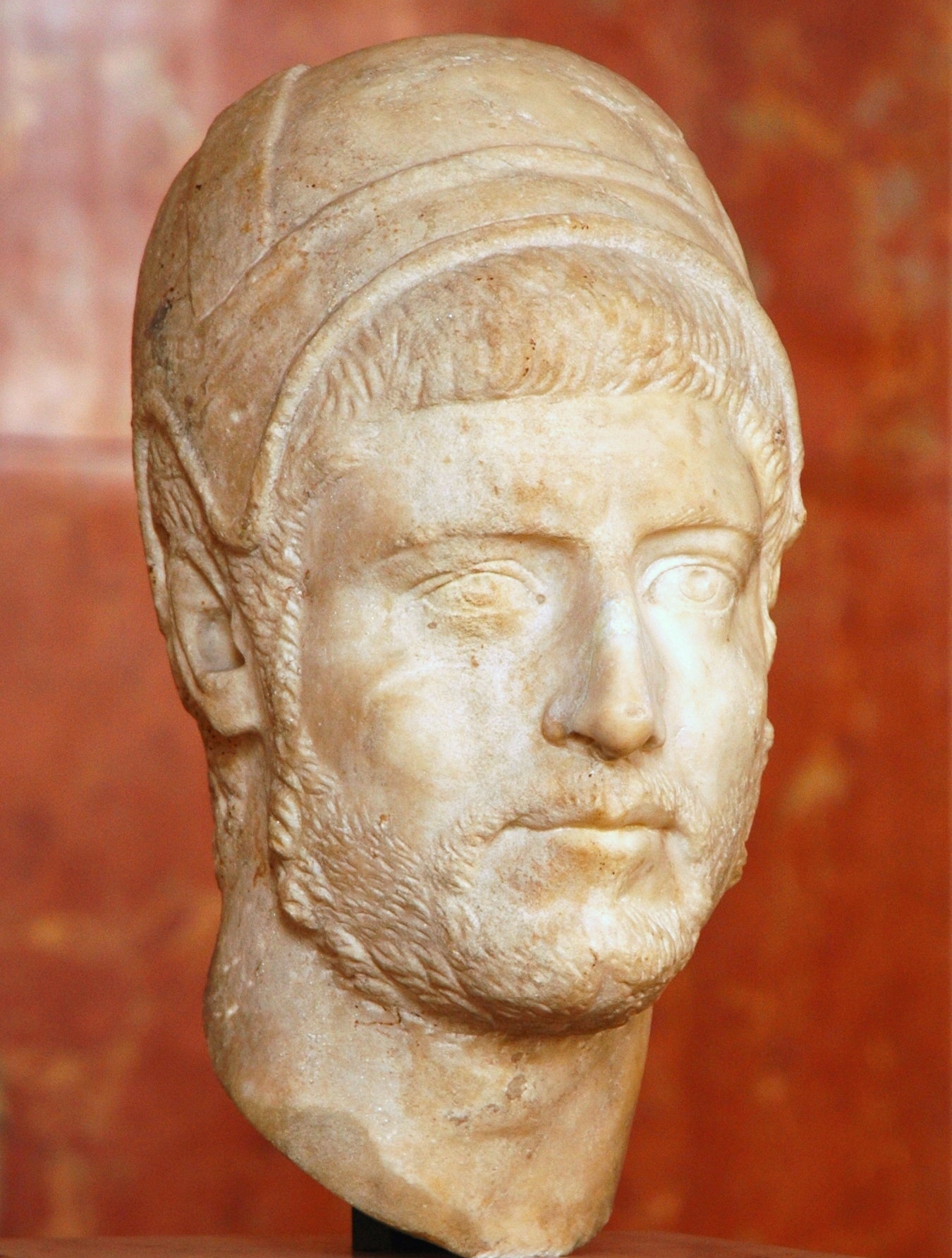
Marble bust of a flamen, 3rd century AD

Imperial priests played an important role in provincial politics and religion. They held "a status recognized by their privileged position in the assembly, and as eponymous officials." While most Roman priests held their religious office for life, provincial priests in client or allied states might be elected for no more than a year, and be simultaneously rewarded with Roman citizenship. The first developments in provincial cults to Caesar as a living god were in the east, where the worship of mortals and heroes was a long-standing tradition. commonplace. They spread after Caesar's death and promotion as divus, especially in the Caesarian and Augustan colonies such as Ephesus, Corinth, Nicaea, Caesarea Maritima. In the West, they were slower to develop.

=== Inscriptional sources from Italy ===
Listed are the known titles of municipal priests of Divus Iulius in Italy from inscriptional sources.

Title	Location	Sources
Flamen Iulianus	Ateste	CIL V.2536
Flamen Divi Iuli	Brixia	CIL V.4384; 4459
[Sacerdos (?)] Divi Iu[li(i)]	Terventum	CIL IX.2598
Flamen Divi Augusti et Divi Iuli et Divi Claudi	Firmum Picenum	AE 1975.353
Flamen Divi Caesaris perpetuus	Monteu da Po / Industria	CIL V.7478
Sacerdos Caesaris	Rogno / Camunni	CIL V.4966
Flamen Divorum omnium	Firmum Picenum	CIL IX.5357; 5362–3; 5365

== See also ==
- Temple of Divus Iulius
- Flamen Dialis, the archpriest of Iuppiter
- Flamen Martialis, archpriest of Mars
- Flamen Quirinalis, archpriest of Quirinus, the deified Romulus
