= Curia Calabra =

The Curia Calabra was a religious station or templum used for the ritual observation of the new moon in ancient Rome. Although its exact location is unclear, it was most likely a roofless enclosure in front of an augural hut (auguraculum), on the southwest flank of the Area Capitolina, the precinct of the Temple of Capitoline Jupiter. Servius identifies the Curia Calabra with a Casa Romuli ("Hut of Romulus") on the Capitoline, but Macrobius implies that it was adjacent to the Casa.

The Roman calendar was originally lunar. On the Kalends or first day of each month, the pontifex minor occupied the Curia Calabra to await the sighting of the new moon. The Rex Sacrificulus and the pontifex then carried out a res divina (religious service) and sacrifice in honor of Juno, and the Roman people were called to assembly (in comitia calata). Like calata, the name Calabra probably derives from calare, "to summon" or "proclaim".

== Sources ==
- Lawrence Richardson, A New Topographical Dictionary of Ancient Rome (Johns Hopkins University Press, 1992), p. 102.
