= Neupauer-Breuner Palace =

Coordinates: 48°12′25″N 16°22′26″E

The Neupauer-Breuner Palace, known in German as Palais Neupauer-Breuner and sometimes referred to only as Palais Breuner by locals, is a Baroque building situated at Singerstrasse 16 in the first district of Vienna in Austria.

== History ==
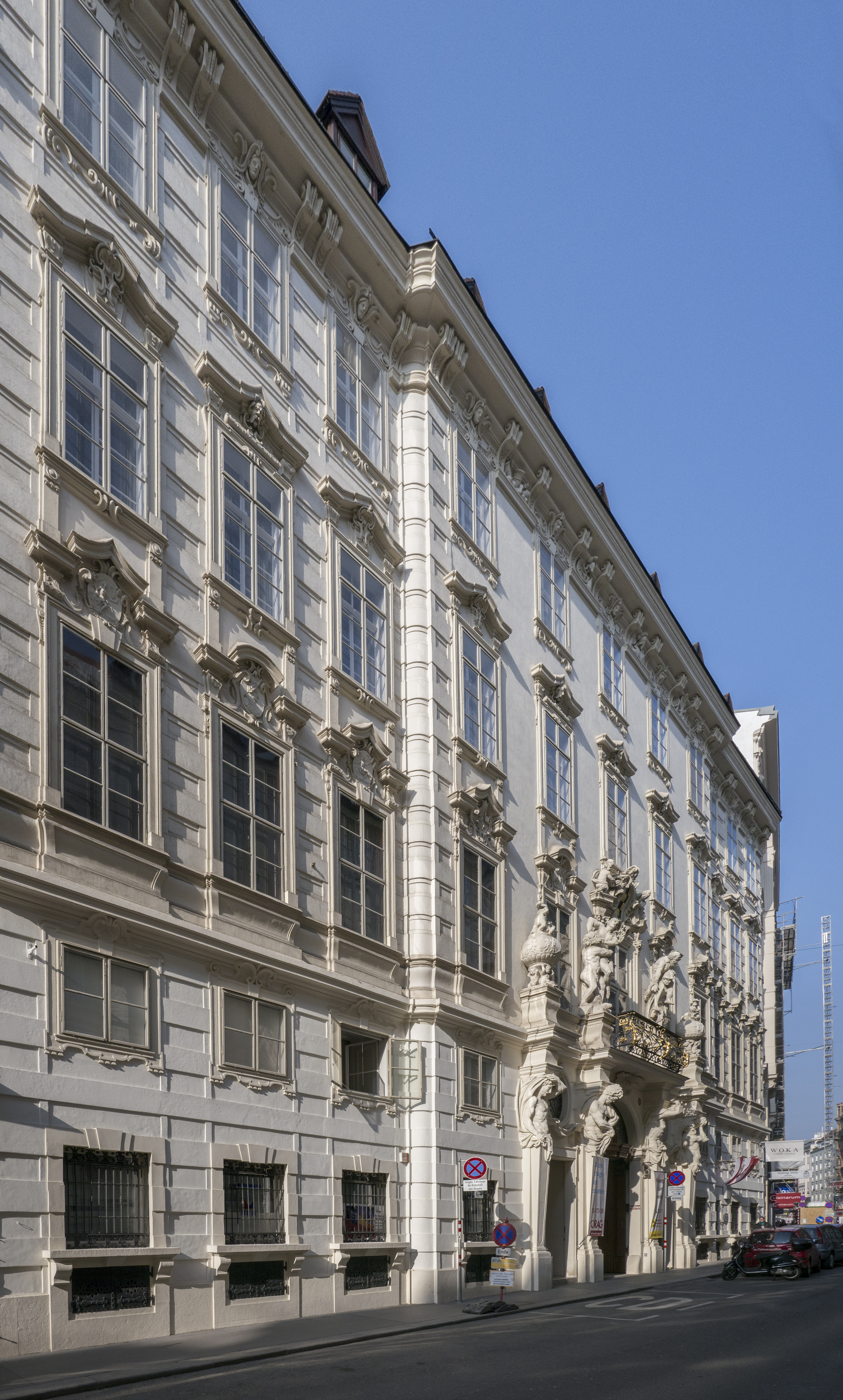
Neupauer-Breuner Palace

The property on which the Palais Breuner stands today was already documented in the Middle Ages.

Over the years, it was held in middle-class ownership, until, in 1706, it reached the Imperial Military Governor, Count Karl Josef de Souches. His eponymous descendant mounted up high debts, so that the three houses standing there were put up for auction in 1715.

The buyer was the Lord High Chamberlain of Vienna, Johann Christian Neupauer, who had the houses demolished and the existing city palace constructed in the place of two of them. The architect of the building is unknown, but he was obviously influenced by Hildebrandt and Fischer von Erlach. Neupauer finally over-speculated, and died in 1735 heavily indebted.

His widow had to sell the palace in 1749, to Maria Anna von Suttner. It then changed ownership several times, until in 1869 it came to Count August Breuner-Enckevoirt. Although the palace was in the possession of his family for only a relatively short time, it has carried their name ever since.

Through inheritance, in 1897 it finally reached Duke Viktor von Ratibor-Corvey.

In 1945, the palace was severely damaged by bombing, but was soon restored.

== Present ==
The present owner is His Serene Highness (HSH) Prince Stephan Metternich-Ratibor.

The building is managed by ÖRAG Österreichische Realitäten-AG and is home to the headquarters of companies like WOKA (lamps), Doris Wagner Cosmetics (skin care), GUARDI (fences, balconies and gates) sowie ILESTO (garden huts and storage boxes). Beside company headquarters and private apartments, the building also houses the Austrian Auction Company. Auctions of antique carpets as well as art are frequently held at their premises.

== Architecture ==
On an area of 1,000 m^{2}, four storeys rise above the basement.

The richly-formed facade on the Singerstrasse presents a fine central projection with five divisions, and two side projections each with three divisions. The coat of arms of the Breuer family, supported by two cherubs, is prominently placed over the balcony doors, replacing the previous one of Johann Christian Neupauer.

In wall niches on the lower floor stand statues of gods and heroes of antiquity (Hercules, Apollo, Flora, Hermes).

The reception rooms, the piano nobile (or belle etage), on the main floor, were fully refurbished in the second half of the 19th century by the architects Ludwig and Hugo Ernst Wächtler. They display beautiful ceramic stoves, parquet flooring, and late historicist wooden plaques in Old German forms.
