= Floralia =

Roman religious festival for the goddess Flora

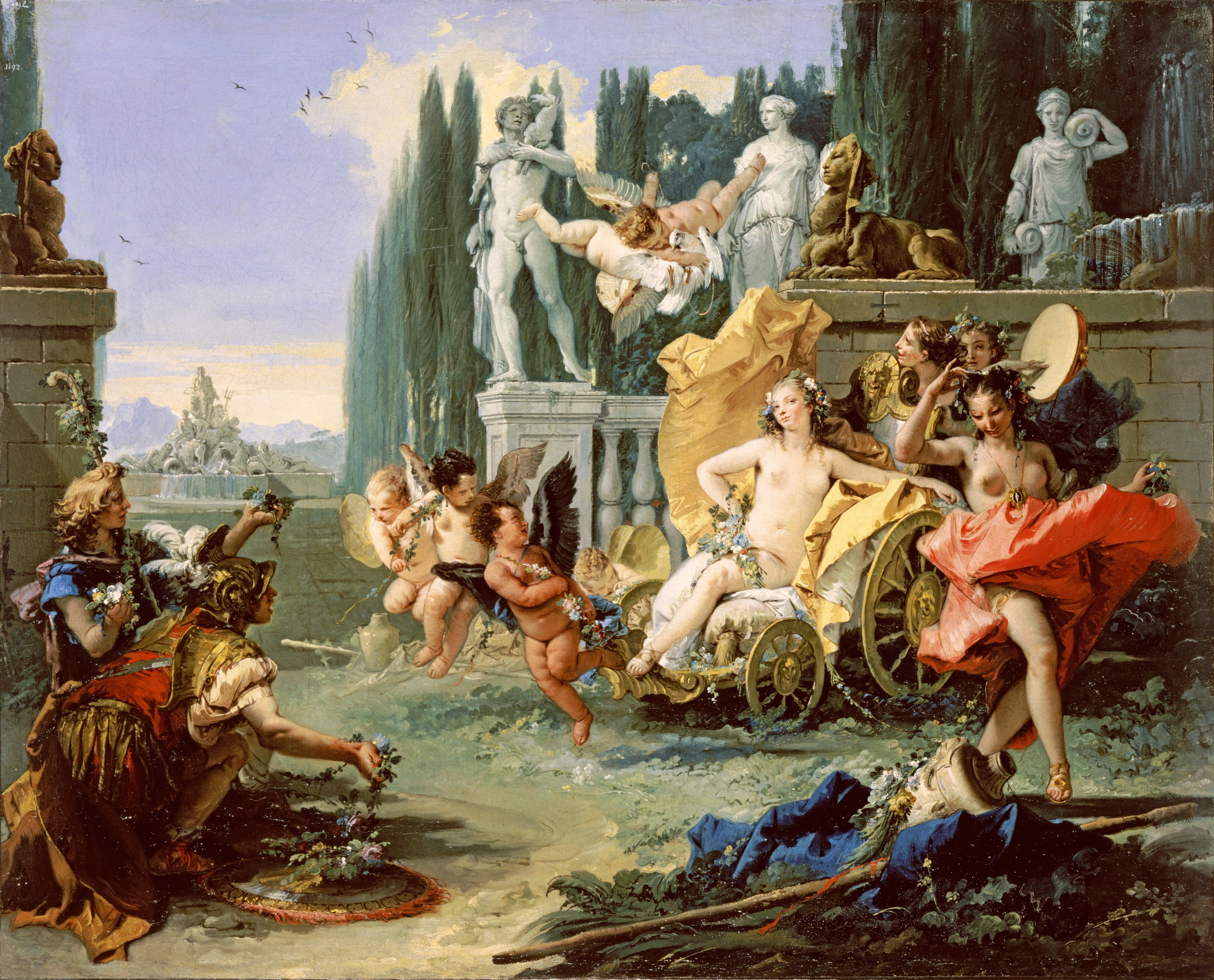
- Triumph of Flora by Tiepolo (ca. 1743), a scene based on Ovid's description of the Floralia
- Observed by: Roman Republic, Roman Empire
- Type: Classical Roman religion
- Celebrations: nude dancing, gladiator contests, theatrical performances, circus events
- Observances: sacrifice to Flora; ceremonial release of hares and goats; scattering of legumes; colorful garments worn
- Date: 28 April – 3 May
- Related to: the goddess Flora Floralia is celebrated for 6 days.

The Floralia was a festival of ancient Roman religion in honor of the goddess Flora, held on 27 April during the Republican era, or 28 April in the Julian calendar. The festival included Ludi Florae, the "Games of Flora", which lasted for six days under the empire.

The festival had a licentious, pleasure-seeking atmosphere. In contrast to many festivals which had a patrician character, the games of Flora were plebeian in nature.

== Flora ==
Flora is one of the most ancient goddesses of Roman religion and was one of fifteen deities to have her own state-supported high priest, the flamen Florialis. A goddess of flowers, vegetation, and fertility, she received sacrifices (piacula) in the sacred grove of the Arval Brothers, an archaic priesthood. Her altar at Rome was said to have been established by the Sabine king Titus Tatius during the semi-legendary Regal period. Flusalis (linguistically equivalent to Floralia) was a month on the Sabine calendar, and Varro counted Flora among the Sabine deities.

== Temples of Flora ==
The Temple of Flora was built in Rome upon consultation with the Sibylline Books shortly after a drought that occurred around 241–238 BCE. The temple was located near the Circus Maximus on the lower slope of the Aventine Hill, a site associated with the plebeians of Rome. Games were instituted for the founding day of the temple (28 April), and were held only occasionally until continued crop damage led to their annual celebration beginning in 173.

Flora Rustica ("Rural Flora") had another temple on the Quirinal Hill, the Temple of Flora Rustica, which may have been the location of the altar erected by Tatius.

== Games ==
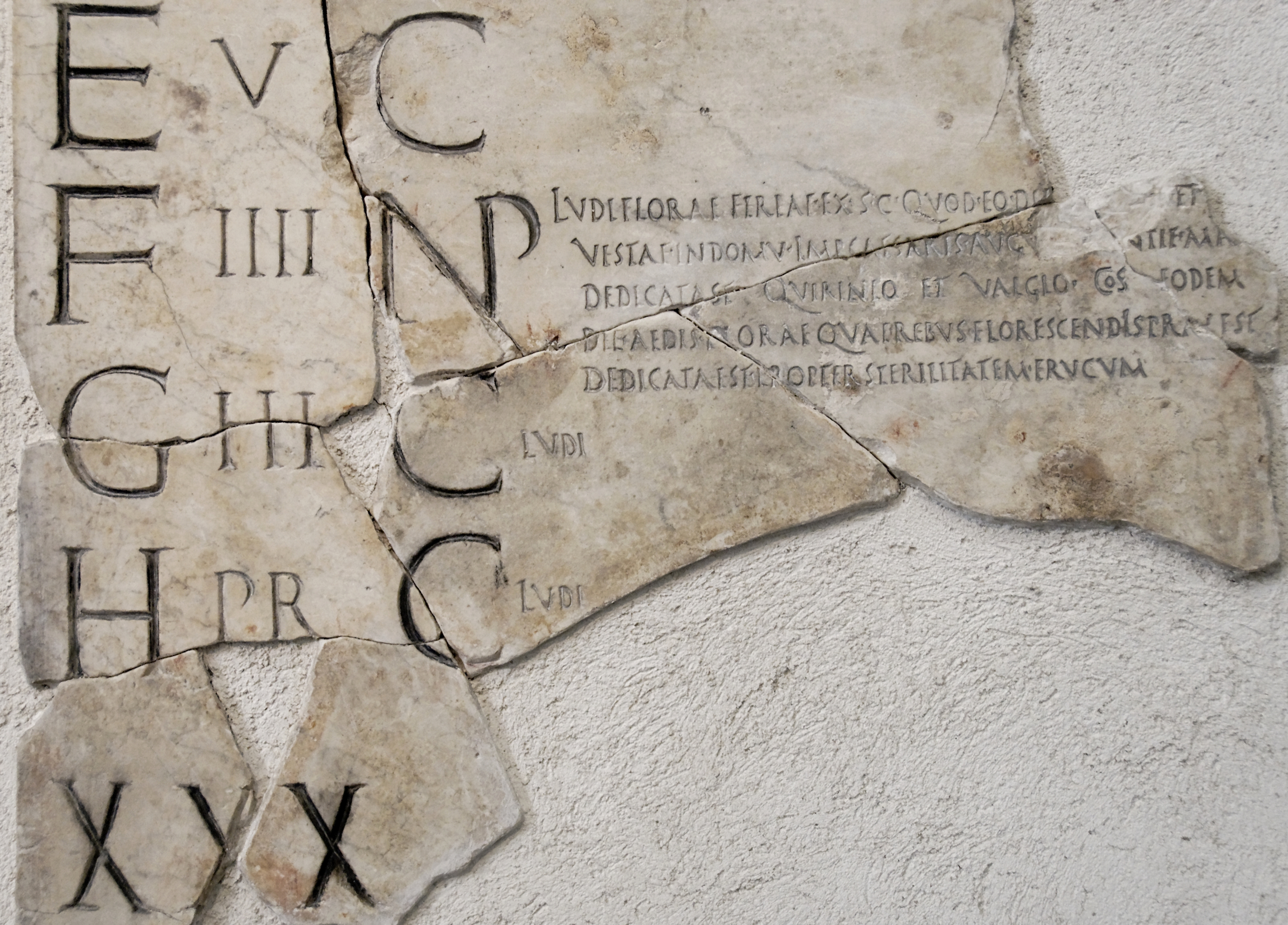
Fragment of the Fasti Praenestini showing a note on the Ludi Florae

The games (ludi) of Flora were presented by the plebeian aediles and paid for by fines collected when public lands (ager publicus) were encroached upon. Cicero mentions his role in organizing games for Flora when he was aedile in 69 BC. The festival opened with theatrical performances (ludi scaenici), and concluded with competitive events and spectacles at the Circus and a sacrifice to Flora. In AD 68, the entertainments at the Floralia presented under the emperor Galba featured a tightrope-walking elephant.

=== Participation of prostitutes ===
Prostitutes participated in the Floralia as well as the wine festival (Vinalia) on 23 April. According to the satirist Juvenal, prostitutes danced naked and fought in mock gladiator combat. Many prostitutes in ancient Rome were slaves, and even free women who worked as prostitutes lost their legal and social standing as citizens, but their inclusion at religious festivals indicates that they were not completely cast out from society.

== Observances ==
Ovid says that hares and goats—animals considered fertile and salacious—were ceremonially released as part of the festivities. Persius says that the crowd was pelted with vetches, beans, and lupins, also symbols of fertility.

In contrast to the Cerealia, when white garments were worn, multi-colored clothing was customary. There may have been nocturnal observances, since sources mention measures taken to light the way after the theatrical performances.

A rite called the Florifertum is described by one source as involving the bearing (fert-) of wheat ears (spicae) into a shrine (sacrarium). It is unclear whether the offering was made to Flora or to Ceres, or whether if made to Flora it occurred on 27 April or 3 May. Ovid describes a florifertum in honor of Juno Lucina on 1 March, a date also celebrated as the dies natalis ("birthday") of Mars in whose conception Flora played a role.

== See also ==
- Maiuma (festival), Roman-era religious water festival held in May
- May Queen
- Roman festivals
- Rosalia, a festival of roses celebrated throughout the Roman Empire
