= Palatua =

Roman goddess

Palatua was a Roman goddess who was provided an official priest or flamen, the Flamen Palatualis. She was the guardian deity of the southern peak of the Palatine Hill.

Aside from this little else is known about her, and it is a safe assumption that her cult, like those of Falacer or Volturnus, had diminished during the late republican period, and that by the beginning of the Empire there were few, if any, followers aside from the flamen.
