= Dialia =

In Ancient Roman religious practice, Dialia were sacred rites to Jupiter, performed by the Flamen Dialis. It was not, however, of such necessity that the Dialia were to be performed by the Flamen Dialis; others might also have officiated. We find in the Annals of Tacitus, that if he were sick, or detained by any other public employ, the pontifices took his place.
