= Temple of Flora =

Ancient temple in Rome, Italy

- Aedes Florae (Latin)
- Tempio di Flora (Italian)
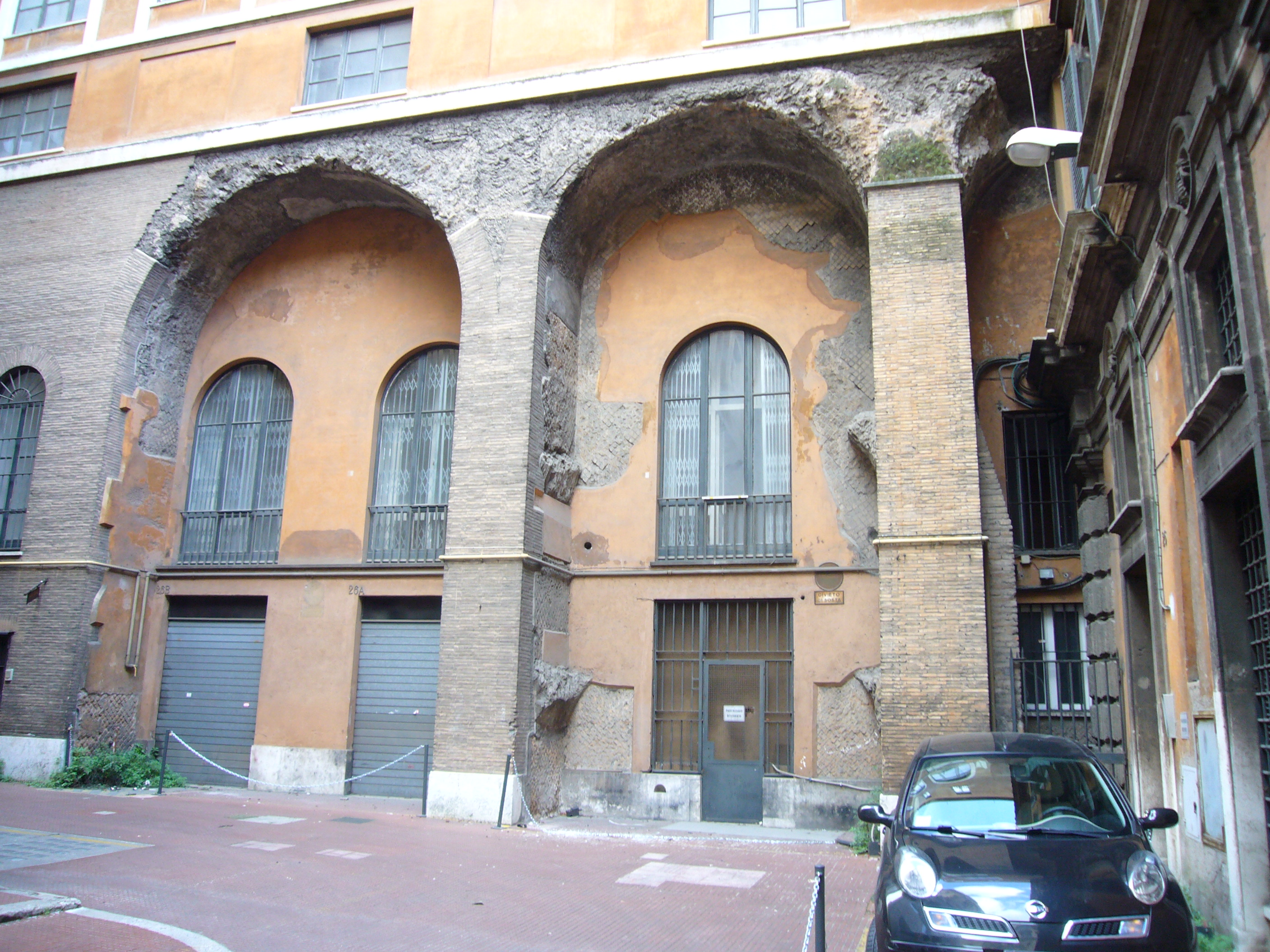
- Vaulted ancient structures incorporated into the foundations of Palazzo Barberini, associated with the temple's circus grounds.

- Shown within ancient Rome
- Interactive map of Temple of Flora
- 41°54′12″N 12°29′17″E
- Location: Rome, Italy

History
- Built: 238 BCE

Site notes
- Area: Quirinal Hill (Regio VI Alta Semita)

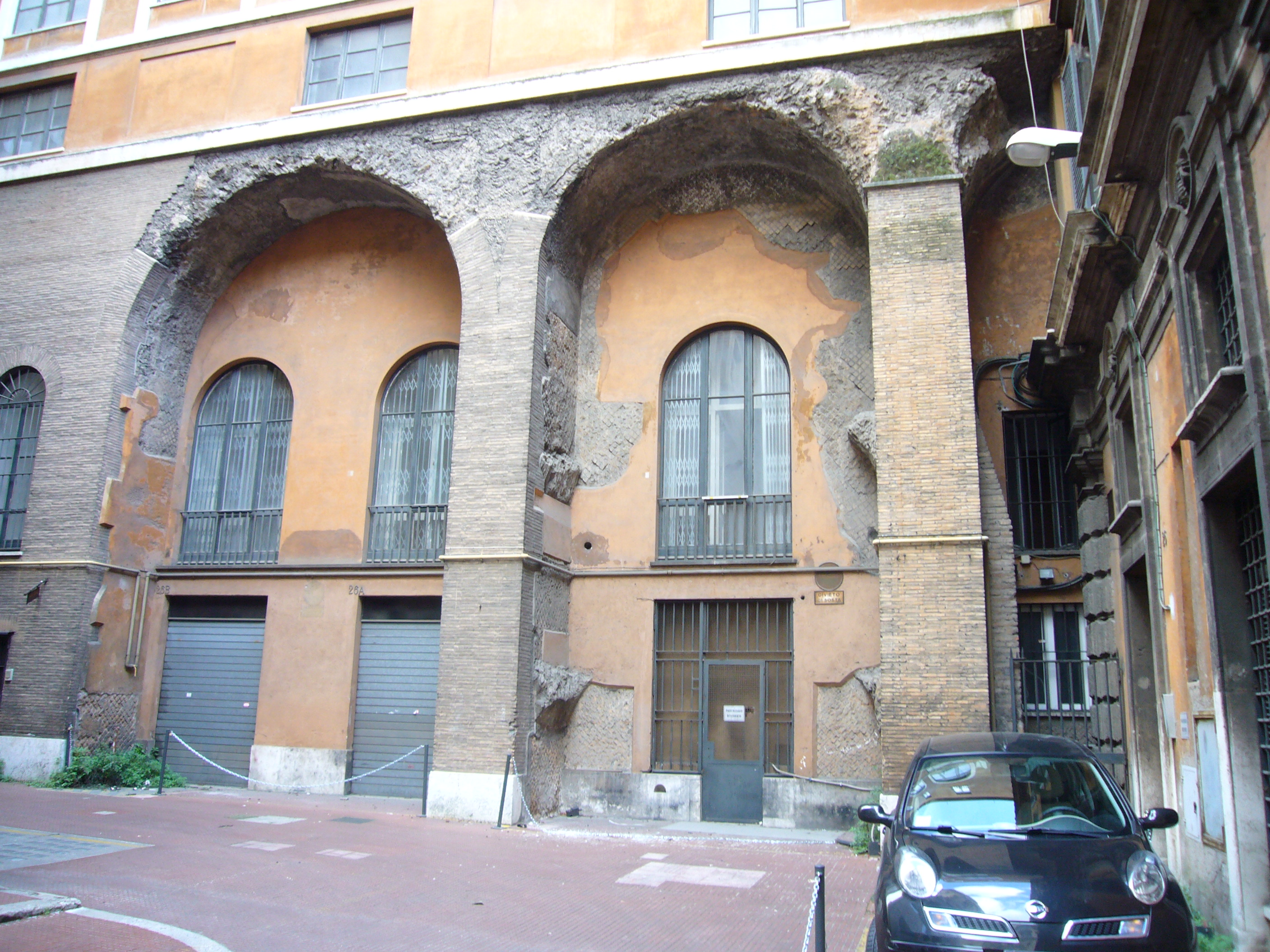
Temple of Flora

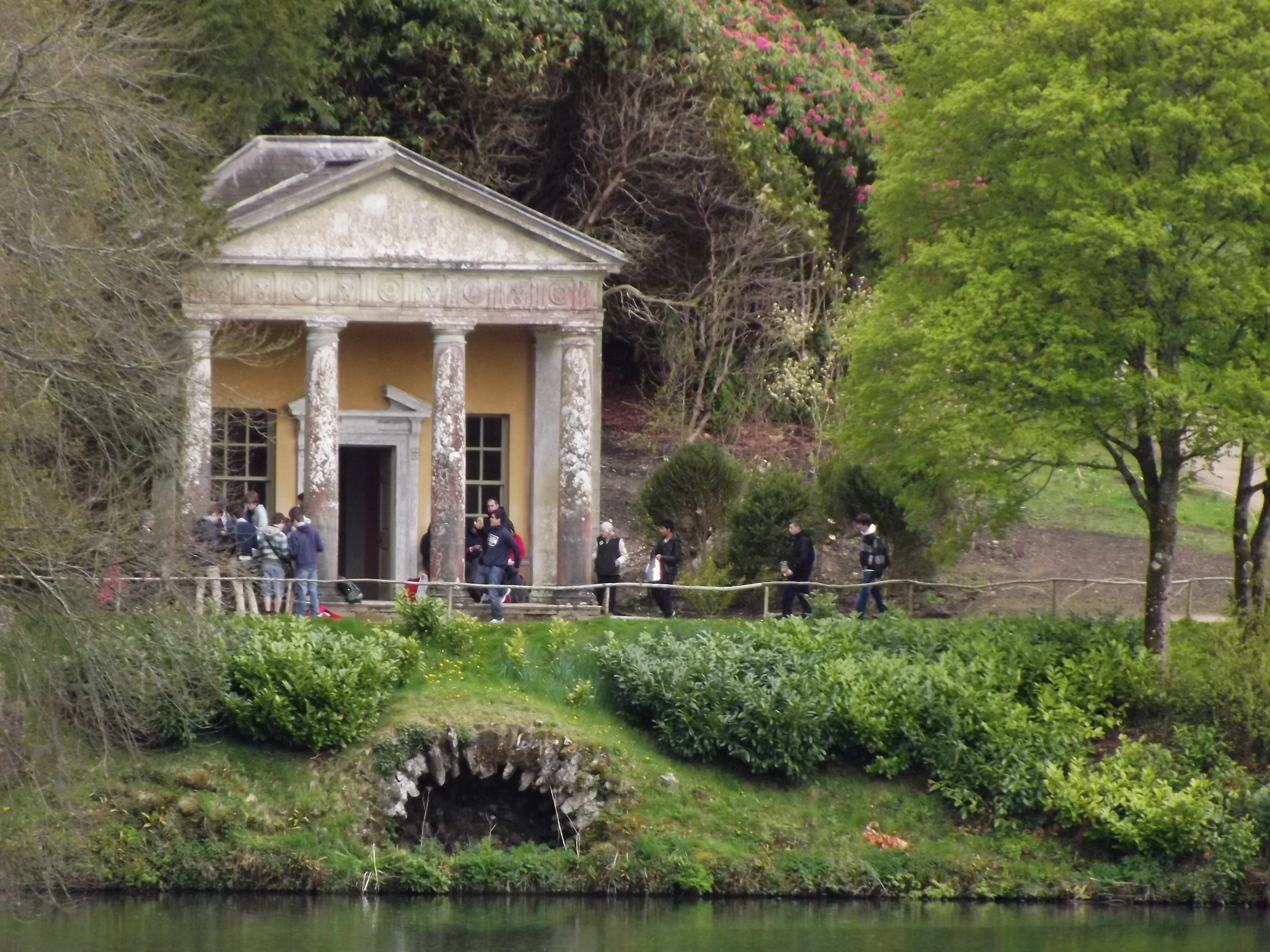
Temple of Flora, Stourhead Gardens, Wiltshire, UK

The Temple of Flora was an ancient sanctuary on the Quirinal Hill in Ancient Rome, erected in 238 BCE and dedicated to the goddess Flora.

== History ==
In 240 B.C.E, the festival Floralia was introduced in Rome on the advice of the Sibylline books, and two years later a temple was erected, also with the support of the Sibylline books. Because of their sexual connotations, the festival and the cult centered in the temple of Flora were hated by the Christians, who attempted to have the popular worship discredited by claiming that it had been founded in honor of a prostitute. The cult was likely suppressed in the 4th century during the persecution of pagans in the late Roman Empire, when the sanctuary would have been closed.

== See also ==
- List of Ancient Roman temples
