= Diffarreation =

Type of divorce in ancient Rome

In Ancient Rome, diffarreatio (from Lat dif- + farreum, a emmer-cake) was a form of divorce in which a cake was used. Diffarreatio was properly the dissolving of marriages contracted by confarreatio, which were those of the pontifices. Festus says it was performed with a wheaten cake and that it was called diffarreatio from far, "wheat". Vigenère claims that confarreatio and diffarreatio are the same thing.
