= Chloris (nymph) =

Greek nymph or goddess

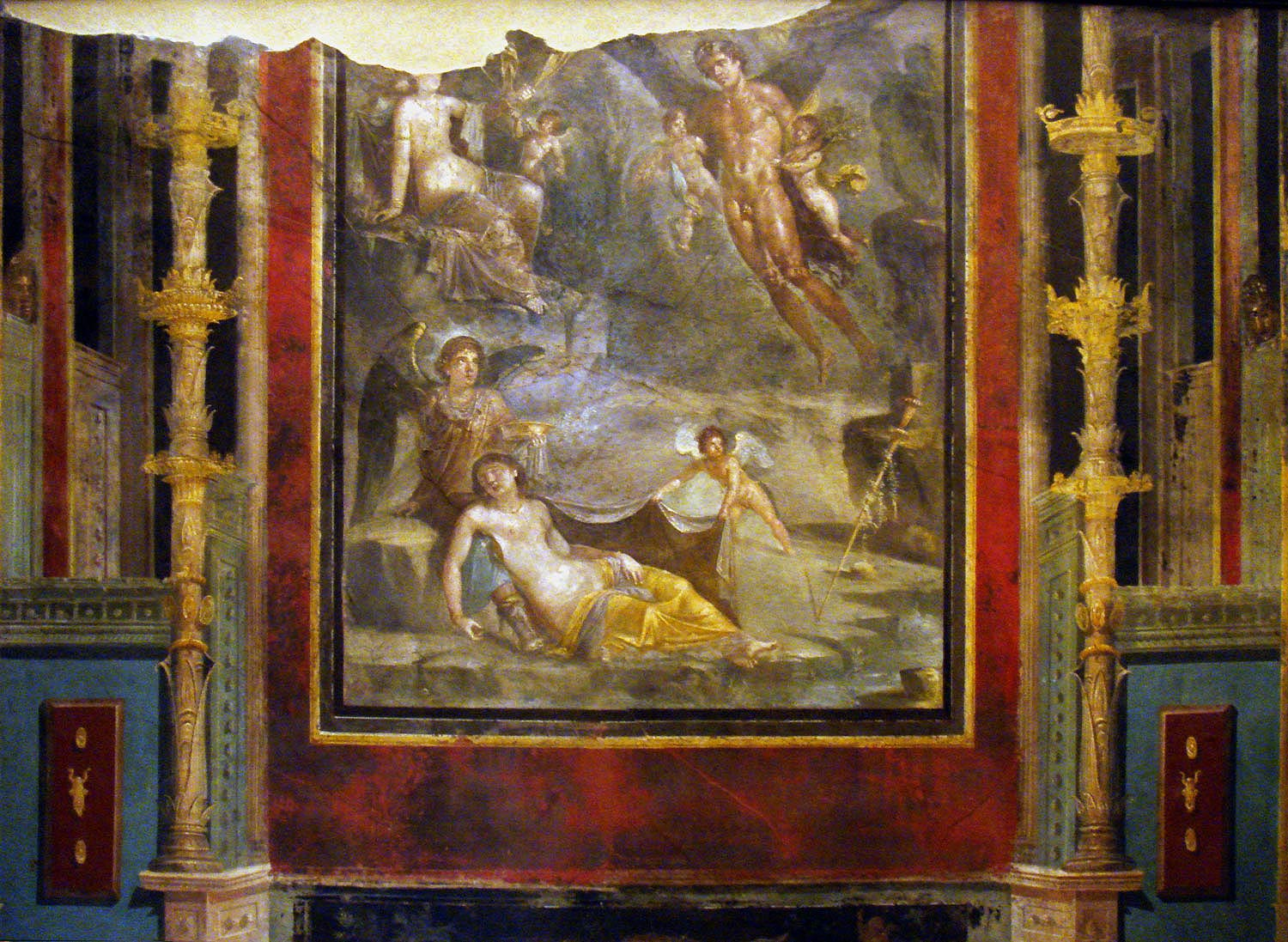
The wedding of Zephyrus and Chloris. Antique fresco in Pompeii

In Greek mythology, Chloris (/ˈklɔːrɪs/; Ancient Greek: χλωρίς, romanized: Khlōrís, from χλωρός khlōrós, meaning "greenish-yellow", "pale green", "pale", "pallid", or "fresh") was a minor nymph who was associated with spring, flowers and new growth, believed to have dwelt in the Elysian Fields.

Chloris is the equivalent of the Roman goddess Flora, a deity presiding over fertility and vegetation.

== Mythology ==
Chloris, an Oceanid (one of the many daughters of the Titans, Oceanus and Tethys), was abducted by Zephyrus, the god of the west wind (which, as Ovid himself points out, was a parallel to the story of his brother Boreas and Orithyia), who transformed her into a deity known as Flora after they were married. Together, they have a son, named Karpos. She was also thought to have been responsible for the transformations of Adonis, Attis, Crocus, Hyacinthus and Narcissus into flowers.

In Ovid's Fasti V, she was partially responsible for the conception of Ares, who was born as revenge for Athena's birth. Hera came to her for rest, and upon discovering that Chloris could help her, insisted on it and swore not to tell Zeus. Using a flower, Chloris made Hera pregnant with Ares. Later, she was given a place in Rome for her involvement in Ares' birth.

== Depictions ==
Cultural depictions of Chloris
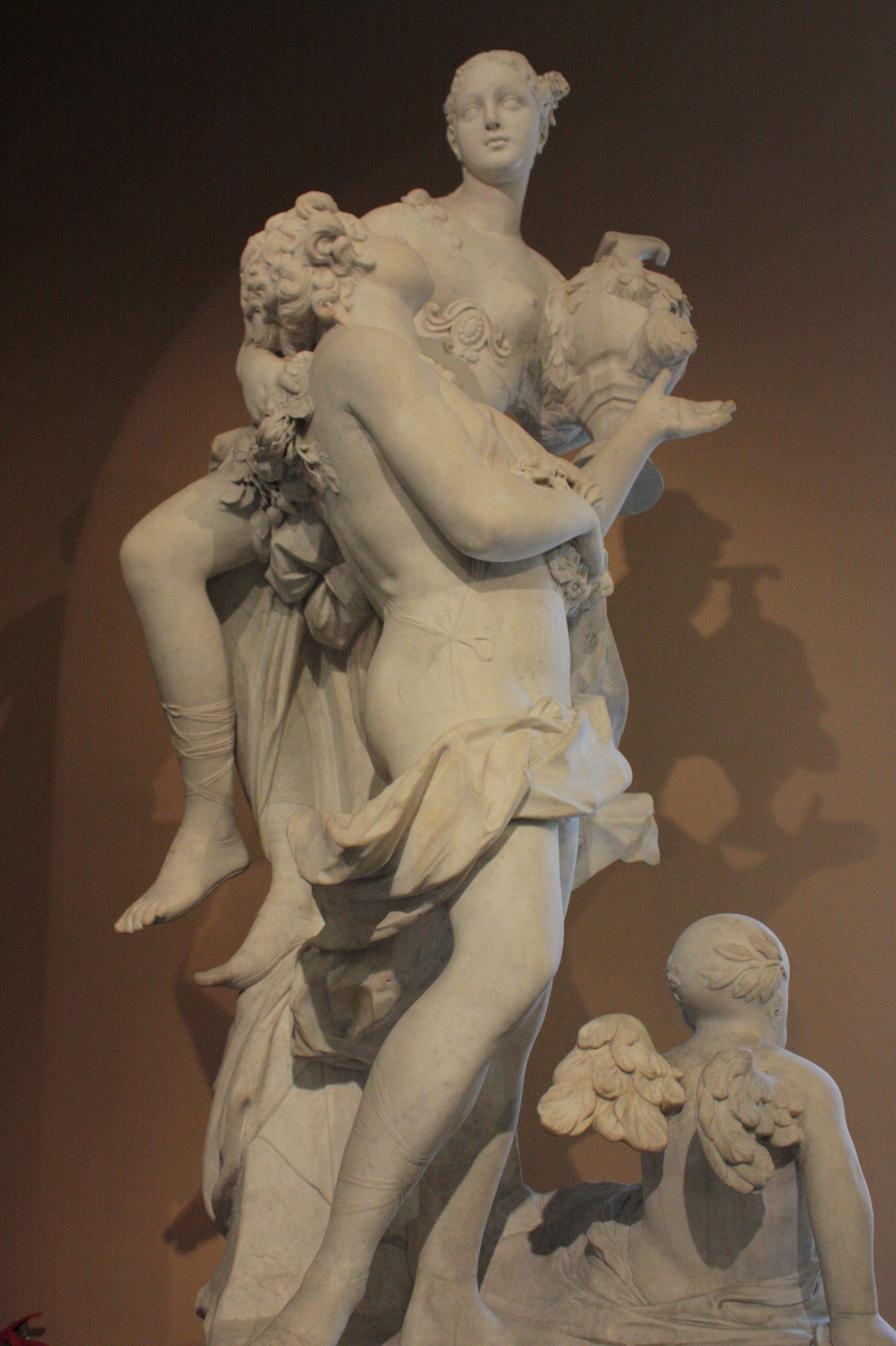
Zephyr and Flora, c. 1720, by Antonio Corradini, Victoria and Albert Museum

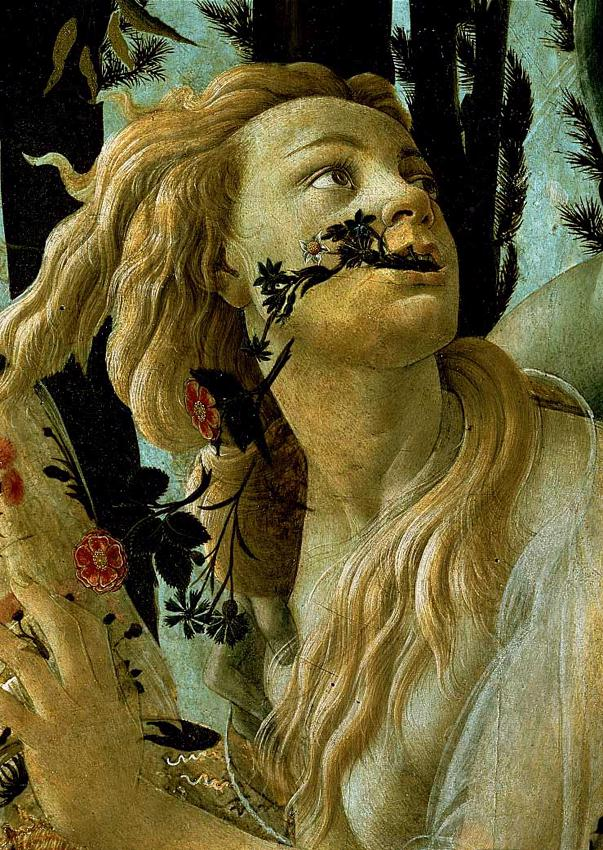
"As she talks, her lips breathe spring roses: I was Chloris, who am now called Flora." Ovid

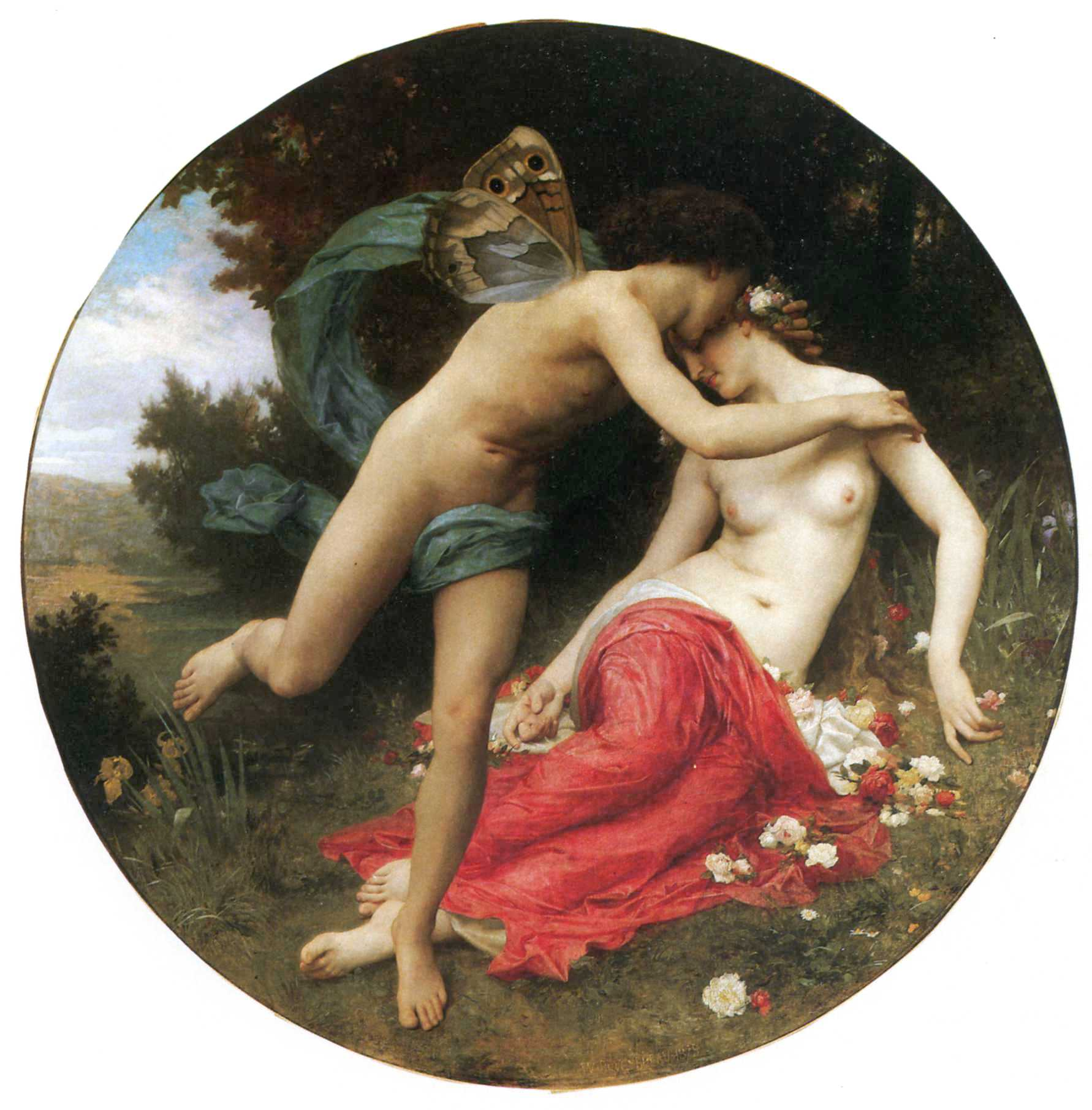
Zephyrus with Chloris (Flora and Zyphyr) by William-Adolphe Bouguereau, in the Musee des Beau-Arts of the Musées Mulhouse Sud Alsace.

== See also ==
- Demeter/Ceres
- Leshy
- List of nature deities
- Orithyia

== General references ==
- Publius Ovidius Naso, Fasti translated by James G. Frazer. Online version at the Topos Text Project.
- Publius Ovidius Naso, Fasti. Sir James George Frazer. London; Cambridge, MA. William Heinemann Ltd.; Harvard University Press. 1933. Latin text available at the Perseus Digital Library.
