= Flamen Dialis =

High priest of Jupiter in ancient Rome

In ancient Roman religion, the flamen Dialis was the high priest of Jupiter. The term Dialis is related to Diespiter, an Old Latin form of the name Jupiter. There were 15 flamines, of whom three were flamines maiores, serving the three gods of the Archaic Triad. According to tradition the flamines were forbidden to touch metal, ride a horse, or see a corpse. The Flamen Dialis was officially ranked second in the ranking of the highest Roman priests (ordo sacerdotum), behind only the rex sacrorum and before other flamines maiores (Flamen Martialis, Flamen Quirinalis) and pontifex maximus.

The office of Flamen Dialis, and the offices of the other flamines maiores, were traditionally said to have been created by Numa Pompilius, second king of Rome, although Numa himself performed many of the rites of the Flamen Dialis.

== Appointment and privileges ==
The Flamen Dialis enjoyed many peculiar honours. When a vacancy occurred, three persons of patrician descent, whose parents had been married according to the ceremonies of confarreatio (the strictest form of Roman marriage), were nominated by the Comitia, one of whom was selected (captus), and consecrated (inaugurabatur) by the Pontifex Maximus. The candidates also had to be married, confarreatio and to a virgin (see Flamen#Marriage).

From that time forward he was emancipated from the control of his father, and became sui juris. He alone of all priests wore the apex, (Note: Varro, ap. Gellius) he had a right to a lictor, to the toga praetexta, to the Sella Curulis, and to a seat in the Roman Senate ex officio. This last privilege, after having fallen into disuse for a long period, was asserted by Gaius Valerius Flaccus (209 BC), the claim allowed however, says Livy, more in deference to his high personal character than from a conviction of the justice of the demand. The Rex Sacrificulus or Rex Sacrorum alone was entitled to recline above him at a banquet; if one in bonds took refuge in his house, the chains were immediately struck off and conveyed through the impluvium to the roof, and thence cast down into the street: if a criminal on his way to punishment met him, and fell suppliant at his feet, he was respited for that day, similar to the right of sanctuary attached to the persons and dwellings of the papal cardinals.

== Restrictions ==
The Flamen Dialis was subjected to many restrictions and privations, many of considerable Indo-European vintage, a long catalogue of which was compiled by Aulus Gellius from the works of Fabius Pictor and Masurius Sabinus.

- It was unlawful for him to be out of the city for a single night; a regulation which seems to have been modified by Augustus, insofar that an absence of two nights was permitted.
- He was forbidden to sleep out of his own bed for three nights consecutively. Thus, it was impossible for him to undertake the government of a province.
- He might not
  - mount or even touch a horse,
  - touch iron, or
  - look at an army marshalled outside the pomerium.
- He might not be elected to the consulship. Indeed, it would seem that originally he was altogether precluded from seeking or accepting any civil magistracy; but this last prohibition was certainly not enforced in later times.
- The Flamen Dialis was required to wear certain unusual garments, such as the apex, a point-tipped hat, and a laena, a heavy wool cloak.
- He was not allowed to swear an oath,
- nor to wear a ring nisi pervio et casso ("unless plain and without stones");
- nor to strip himself naked in the open air
- nor to go out without his proper head-dress
- nor to have a knot in any part of his attire
- nor to walk along a path over-canopied by vines.
- He might not touch flour, nor leaven, nor leavened bread.
- He might not touch a dead body, nor enter a burial place, but he was allowed to attend a funeral.
- He was forbidden either to touch or to name a dog, a she-goat, ivy, beans, or raw flesh.
- None but a free man might cut his hair; the clippings of which, together with the parings of his nails, were buried beneath an arbor felix ("auspicious tree").
- No one might sleep in his bed, the legs of which were smeared with fine clay
- It was unlawful to place a box containing sacrificial cakes in contact with the bedstead
- He was not allowed to be present at a table without food, so that he never appeared wanting.

The object of these rules was clearly to make him literally Jovi adsiduum sacerdotem (the constant priest of Jove / Jupiter), to compel constant attention to the duties of the priesthood, and to leave him effectively without any temptation to neglect them.

In the view of Dumézil, these prohibitions mark the Flamen Dialis as serving a celestial god, with his attributes of absolute purity and freedom, but also wielder of lightning and kingship. Within his scope of action there are the domains of political power and right, but not battle, which belongs to Mars and the Flamen Martialis. His solidarity with the king is reflected in that of his earthly counterpart, the rex sacrorum. Similar partnerships, with similar ritual restrictions, are seen reflected in other Indo-European cultures, such as that of the Vedic rajan and his purohita, and the ancient Irish rig and the chief druid.

== Flaminica Dialis ==
The Flaminica Dialis was the wife of the Flamen Dialis. She was required to be a virgin at the time of their wedding, which had to be conducted according to the ceremonies of confarreatio, the traditional form of marriage for patricians. (This regulation also applied to the marriages of the two other flamines maiores.) The couple were not permitted to divorce, and if the flaminica died the Dialis was obliged to resign. The assistance of the flaminica was essential in the performance of certain rituals. On each of the nundinae, she sacrificed a ram to Juno Regina in the Curia Calabra. The flaminica was assigned a special ritual attire. Her hair was plaited up with a purple band in a conical form (tutulus), but when she went to participate in the ritual of the Argei, she neither combed nor arranged her hair. The flaminica and the regina sacrorum were the only ones who might wear the hairdressing named (in)arculata. The flaminica wore a dyed robe (venenato operitur) and a small square cloth with a border (rica), to which was attached a slip cut from a felix arbor, a tree under the protection of the heavenly gods. The rica may have been a short cloak, or less likely a sort of scarf or veil thrown over the head. The restrictions imposed upon the flaminica were similar to those placed on her husband. She was prohibited from mounting a staircase consisting of more than three steps, perhaps to prevent her ankles from being seen.

== Holders of the office ==
- Publius Cornelius Sulla, probably appointed flamen by the Pontifex Maximus Publius Cornelius Calussa c. 279–270 BC. He may have been the son of Publius Cornelius Rufinus, and the first member of his family named Sulla.
- Lucius Quinctius, appointed in the middle of the 3rd century BC. He was probably a son of Caeso Quinctius Claudus, and the ancestor of the Quinctii Flaminini. (Note: Münzer thought that Caeso Quinctius Claudus was the brother of the Claudus who was consul 271 BC.)
- Publius Cornelius Scipio, grandson of Scipio Africanus, became Flamen Dialis in 174 BC. He died soon after between 170 and 168 BC.
- Lucius Cornelius Merula was likely chosen flamen at the end of the 2nd century BC. He is mostly known for his death in 87 BC, during the civil war between the two consuls of 87 BC, Octavius and Cinna. Appointed suffect consul in replacement of Cinna, who had been expelled by Octavius, Merula resigned when Cinna returned to Rome with an army. Targeted by Cinna's and Marius' purge, he instead committed suicide in Dec. 87 in the Temple of Jupiter, calling down curses on his enemies with his dying breath.
- Gaius Julius Caesar, the future dictator, was chosen at the instigation of Cinna, his father-in-law, at the end of 87 BC, or before 13 January 86 BC, while Marius was still alive. Many scholars have however debated the possibility that Caesar was never formally appointed, because of his age. The theory that religious technicalities interfered as if his mother Aurelia was not plebeian are false. Aurelia was a patrician. Caesar nonetheless lost his priesthood during the dictatorship of Sulla, in about 81, but was elected a regular pontifex in the College of Pontiffs in 77, according to Vell. 2.43.1. He was elected pontifex maximus in 63 BC. No Flamen Dialis was appointed thereafter, and the office then remained vacant for about 72 years. until 16/15 BC (Dec. 87 BC - 72 years = 16 or 15 BC -- per Tac. Ann. 3.58.4, which has wrongly been emended by some editors to "75 years." Due to inclusive counting, it is hard to be certain if this means 71 or 72 years).
- Servius Cornelius Lentulus Maluginensis, probably a son of Gnaeus Cornelius Lentulus Augur. Born c. 30 BC, he seems to have become flamen c. 15 BC, after the long hiatus that followed the removal of Caesar. But since the first mention of him in office appears in Tac. Ann. 3.58.1 for AD 22, it is very likely he was not the first man to hold the post after the long vacancy. Accordingly, the exact date that Maluginensis became Flamen Dialis is uncertain. Cassius Dio 54.36.1 says the post was filled about 11 BC, a date unwisely accepted by many modern scholars who forget that Tacitus is more reliable and closer to the events than Dio. Tacitus 3.58.4 clearly indicates that the date was 72 years after the suicide of Cornelius Merula in Dec. 87 BC. Some modern translators have preferred Dio over Tacitus, including Penguin's Rex Warner.
- Cornelius Lentulus Maluginensis, succeeded his father as flamen in AD 23, probably at a very young age.
- Terentius Gentianus is mentioned as flamen in an inscription commissioned for his sister. The last known Flamen Dialis. Since he was also consul in AD 211 it seems the restrictions on holding political offices had been removed.

== See also ==
- Dialia

== Bibliography ==
- Henri Etcheto, Les Scipions. Famille et pouvoir à Rome à l’époque républicaine, Bordeaux, Ausonius Éditions, 2012.
- Friedrich Münzer, Roman Aristocratic Parties and Families, translated by Thérèse Ridley, Johns Hopkins University Press, 1999 (originally published in 1920).
- Jörg Rüpke, Anne Glock, David Richardson (translator), Fasti Sacerdotum: A Prosopography of Pagan, Jewish, and Christian Religious Officials in the City of Rome, 300 BC to AD 499, Oxford University Press, 2008.

This article is based on a portion of the article "Flamen" from Smith's Dictionary of Greek and Roman Antiquities, in the public domain.
