= Flamen =

Priest in ancient Rome

A flamen (plural, flamines) was a specific type of priest (sacerdos) in the ancient Roman religion and one of the oldest classes of the Roman priesthood, with origins likely predating the Republican era. These flamines, of which there were fifteen, were high-ranking members of the College of Pontiffs who administered and oversaw the various cults of the state-sponsored religion, both collectively and individually. The most important of these were the three flamines maiores ("major priests"), who each served one of the gods of the Archaic Triad: Jupiter, Mars, and Quirinus. The remaining twelve flamines minores ("lesser priests") served various minor deities, of whom little is definitively known, with two of their identities even being forgotten. While these original flamines lost most of their cultural and religious significance by the dawn of the Empire, the term flamen went on to be used in reference to priests of the cults of deified Emperors (divus).

== Etymology ==
The etymology of flamen remains obscure, and perhaps undecidable. The term is traditionally connected with the Proto-Germanic verb *blōtaną ("to sacrifice"; cf. Gothic blotan), by positing a Proto-Indo-European stem *bʰleh₂d-m(e)n- (or *bʰleh₂g-m(e)n-), which could have originally meant "sacrifice". However, the link remains uncertain since it is impossible to decide whether the Latin form reflects an earlier flă-men, flăd-men or flăg-smen.

Indo-European scholar Georges Dumézil attempted to link the term to the Sanskrit word brahman. (Note: "The Sanskrit brahman ... must derive, with reverse guna, from *bhelgh-men- or *bholgh-men-. The Latin flamen must derive from a neighboring form, *bhlagh-smen-, which, along with forms having the radical -el- or - ol-, presents the same shift." — Dumézil) Dumézil himself notes that the etymology has problems in terms of phonological shifts, and the cognates have not been universally accepted by modern scholars. (Note: Dumézil was aware of the technical difficulties, but defended the weak link based on the broader grounds, that the nexus between bráhman / flamen was part of a pair of dyadic terms, the other being Skt. ráj- / Latin rēg-, which were key roles in his hypothetical tripartite ideology underpinning Indo-Europeans' social organization. He claimed this comparative sociological framework strengthened the claimed cognate identities between the two pairs of terms.) Andrew Sihler considers the claim that flamen might be a cognate of the Vedic term to be as plausible. He notes that the hypothesis of a connection to Gothic blotan and via Proto-Indo-European *bʰleh₂d-m(e)n- is equally plausible. Martin Litchfield West states, "it is not unproblematic, and sometimes rejected. Yet it is hard to dismiss the similarity of the words as fortuitous––they share the masculine suffix *-men-, which is an archaic rarity––and the identification continues to be canvassed, albeit with reservations. The case for it is strengthened by the fact that the Brahman and the Flamen Dialis were subject to a whole series of similar taboos."

== History ==
By the time of the religious reformations initiated by Emperor Augustus, the origins and functions of a number of gods resident in Rome were considered confusing and archaic, even to the Romans themselves. The age and relative obscurity of some of the deities assigned a flamen (such as Falacer, Palatua, and Volturnus) suggests that this class of the priesthood dates back to the early days of Rome, at least as far back as the Roman Kingdom. The Romans themselves even credited their foundation to Numa Pompilius, the legendary second King of Rome. According to the historian Livy, in order to fulfill the more intensive religious duties originally performed by the King, Numa created the offices of the three flamines maiores and assigned each a fine robe of office and a curule seat. The flamines were circumscribed by a series of highly restrictive taboos, as in the case of the flamen Dialis, the stability of Rome itself was believed to depend on his continued purity and holiness. In fact, the most detailed surviving records of the flamines often focus on the practices and traditions associated with the flamen Dialis, the highest-ranking and most significant of the flamines.

Some modern scholars have raised the possibility that the roles of the Roman flamines may have extended beyond simply overseeing the cults of their respective deities, even hypothesizing that they may have represented and provided religious services to certain segments of the Roman population. This theory is supported by the existence of a flamen among the Arval Brethren (the flamen Arvalium), as well as the flamines of the thirty curiae that divided early Rome (flamines curiales). Based on descriptions from some Roman sources, the three flamines maiores may have collectively represented the entire Roman populace, as evidenced by their common sacrifices to the goddess of faithfulness Fides. By the Republican era, the maiores were collectively invoked both in treaties composed by the fetiales and in the devotio oath taken by generals during times of unrest.

By the Imperial era, the term flamen seems to have mostly been used in reference to the priests of the Imperial cult, whose regulations and standards appear to have been modeled after those of the flamen Dialis. This new incarnation of the priesthood aided in the spread and homogenization of the Imperial cult throughout the growing Roman Empire, with priests being assigned to serve certain cities and provinces, and in some regions specifically dedicated to the cult of Augustus (the divi filius, or more specifically the divi Iuli filius). While these priests were still given the antiquated title of flamen in most provinces and regions, others used the more general and widely-recognized sacerdos (plural, sacerdotes), as was the case with the Sacerdotes Augustales.

In post-Antiquity, the word flamen (plural, "flamens") became a general term for any priest who serves a specific deity.

== Appointment ==
Since the early days of the flaminates, the Roman populace took an active role in the selection of a new flamen, nominating fellow citizens believed to be worthy of the position. Originally these nominations were handled by the Curiate Assembly, the oldest legislative gathering in the city, ultimately selecting and consecrating each new flamen. However, following the passing of the Roman law "Lex Domitia de sacerdotis" ("The Domitian Law Regarding the Priesthood") in 104 BC, which formalized the selection processes for Roman priests, nominations for the flaminates were now handled by the more egalitarian Tribal Assembly. They would then be provided to the pontifex maximus, the head of the Pontifical College, who "scrutinized each candidate's qualifications in order to ensure that he...[was] fit to serve." After a new flamen (and, for maiores, also his wife) was chosen, they then had to participate in a traditional Roman ceremony known as the captio, to ensure the gods would accept this new flamen as their representative to the city. An augur would ask the appropriate deities for a blessing, and the gods would respond by providing the proper signs to those present. These ceremonies were known as comitia calata ("callate assemblies") and they were performed on the Capitoline Hill.

The tenure of a flamen was expected to be lifelong, but the holder could be forced to resign for committing a breach of duty, as well as for the occurrence of an ill omen while performing their ceremonial obligations, potentially a divine warning that the flamen had fallen out of favor with their patron deity. In certain situations, a flamen maiore could be represented by a proflamen, a member of the College of Pontiffs who was approved to act as substitute (qui vice flaminis fungebatur). In the case of the flamen Dialis, only the pontifex maximus was allowed to fill in for that role.

== Privileges and restrictions ==
The office of the flaminate granted its holders considerable privileges in Roman society. Regarding the justice system, if a criminal submitted himself before a flamen on the way to his punishment, the priest could delay his fate until the following day. Other notable benefits granted to the flamines included: exemption from the authority of his father (patria potestas); permission to wear the toga praetexta; being provided the service of a lictor; ownership and use of a curule seat; and the possession of an ex officio seat in the Senate.

The flamines, like the other various religious orders in Rome, were also entrusted with protecting the city's sacred objects. An anecdote recounted by Livy reports that before the sack of Rome in 390 BC, the flamines escaped the city with their relics, after debating whether to bury anything they could not carry near their temple precincts.

To counterbalance these considerable benefits and honors, the flamines were also held to extremely high standards of behavioral and ritual purity, particularly concerning associations with pollution and death. Such standards even extended to the wives of the flamines, known as the flaminicae. For example, the flaminica Dialis was not allowed to wear calcei morticini ("shoes made from the skin of an animal that had died of natural causes"), and she was even forbidden from washing or combing her hair on certain days of religious significance. These and many other regulations were intended to ensure her continued role as guardian of the fertility of Rome's entire populace.

Another disadvantage specific to the flamen and flaminica Dialis was that they "were also forbidden to touch, see, or refer to yeast, raw meat, goats, dogs, ivy, or beans", as these items were symbolically associated with pollution and death. They were also required "to remain free of physical and social constraints".

Many modern scholars believe that the flamines maiores bore the majority of these social and ritual regulations, as all holders of the positions were required to be of noble birth, thus already being assigned multiple social rules and expectations to follow. Conversely, as the flamines minores were all commoners, it would likely be considered unrealistic to hold them to a standard that was above their social strata.

While the flamines maiores were highly respected and vital members of the Roman priesthood, their own office could be weaponized against them, as one could potentially be nominated to the position by rivals to halt their political or military advancement, as the restrictions associated with the office were guaranteed to do. For example, they were forbidden from riding horses, as well as from leaving the city of Rome for longer than a day; both mandates would make it extremely difficult for such a person to lead and command an army. Furthermore, the flamines were explicitly barred from running for or holding any political office, a unique distinction from other segments of the Roman priesthood who could still pursue political careers, even using their positions as an advantage.

Eventually, many of the more restrictive taboos were loosened so that only the flamen Dialis was required to adhere to them. This may explain why, following the suicide of flamen Dialis Lucius Cornelius Merula in 87 BC, the flaminate remained vacant for over 70 years, until the Imperial reign of Augustus. Coincidentally, a teenage Julius Caesar was once nominated to fill this vacancy.

== Marriage ==
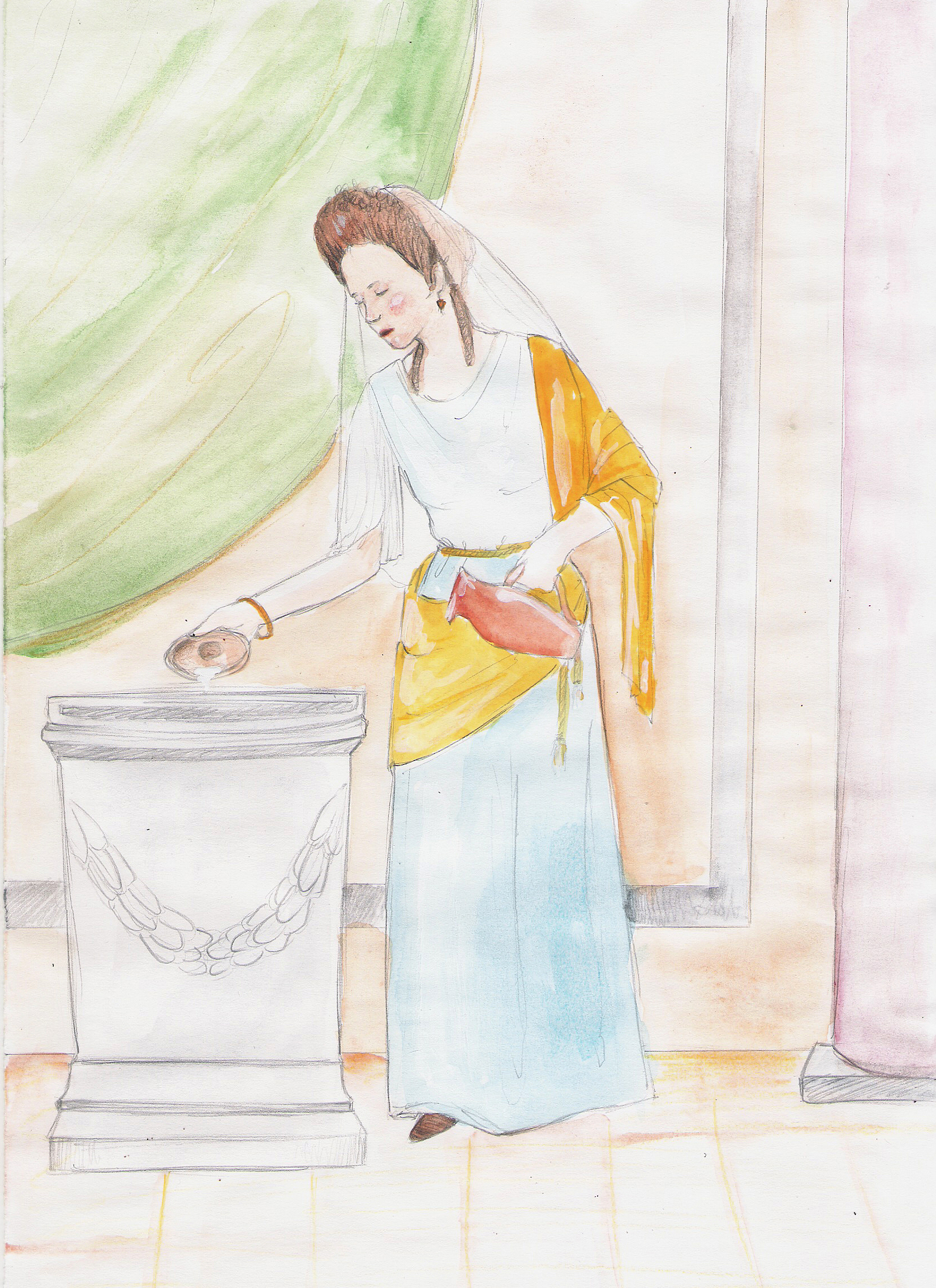
Fulvia Celera, a flaminica from the city of Tarraco who lived between the 1st and 2nd c. AD.

The three major flaminates required the service of a married couple that came from an elite patrician family. Both parents of a flamen, as well as the flamen himself, had to have been married through the ancient ceremony of confarreatio, during which the bride would be passed from the manus (hand) of her father to that of her husband, ritually transferring ownership of the bride. This parental criterion only applied to the flamen, as his wife would be considered part of his family through their marriage. It was also necessary for a potential flaminica to be an unwed virgin before her marriage to her husband, who was also required to have been previously unmarried.

The flamen and flaminica Dialis were required to serve jointly; the couple were not permitted to separate or divorce, and in the event of either's death, the surviving spouse had to step down from their position. They were responsible for performing some rituals together, while others would be performed either separately or with only one as participant. Other restrictions placed upon them even pertained to their marital bed: only the married couple were allowed to sleep in the bed, and neither spouse could sleep elsewhere for more than three consecutive nights. The bed's legs were also required to be covered with "a thin layer of clay", and at the foot was to be a box always filled with freshly-made sacrificial cakes.

== Garb ==
The official costume of a flamen Dialis, allegedly dating back to the office's creation, consisted of a hat called an albogalerus, a heavy cloak called a laena, and a laurel wreath. The laena was a double-thick wool cloak with a fringed edge, worn over the toga praetexta with a clasp to hold it around his throat. The albogalerus was a white leather skull-cap with a chin-strap and a point of olive wood, the apex, on its top. The apex was shaped like a spindle, with a little fluff of wool at the base. This outfit was worn during rituals and sacrifices performed by the flamen, but he was not required or expected to wear it daily. The flamen also wore senatorial boots, called calcei. The flaminica Dialis was responsible for weaving her husband's cloak by hand, using a ritual blade called a secespikta to cut the fabric. The laena could only be made of wool, possibly because of wool's apotropaic qualities and association with purity.

The costume of the flaminicae was also dictated by tradition; they each wore a dyed robe, or venenato operitur (of an unspecified color), with their hair fashioned in a tutulus-style bun and tied in place with a purple ribbon. A square cloak ("rica") was also included, likely draped over the back of the head and across the shoulders, pinned in place with a branch cut from an arbor felix, a tree considered sacred to the gods. It is likely that the type of tree that decorated a particular flaminica's hair was one of specific importance to her respective patron deity, providing some individuality among the women's otherwise identical costumes.

== Flamines maiores ==
The three flamines maiores ("major priests") were required to be noble-born patricians, and were accompanied by a corollary flaminica, a position only allowed to be occupied by the wife of the flamen. They each represented and served a god of the Archaic Triad:

- The flamen Dialis oversaw the cult of Jupiter (Jove), god of the heavens and ruler of the gods. The name of this flamen likely originates from the older forms of the god's name, Diespiter and Diovis.
- The flamen Martialis oversaw the cult of Mars, the god of war and guardian of farmers. While leading public rites on the days of certain festivals and holidays, he would ritually shake the god's sacred spears if the Roman legions were preparing for war.
- The flamen Quirinalis oversaw the cult of Quirinus, the god of Roman social order and possibly an embodiment of the peaceful aspects of Mars. At certain points, he may have also been viewed as the deified form of Romulus, the legendary founder of Rome.

In 42 BC, two years after the assassination of Julius Caesar, the Roman Senate approved the installation of a fourth flamen maior called the flamen Divi Iulii to oversee his cult, solidifying Caesar as an official divinity (divus) of the Roman state. Mark Antony became the first flamen for the "Divine Julius" in 40 BC.

Thereafter, during the Imperial period, any deceased Emperor could be made divus by vote of the Senate with the consent of the current Emperor, and his cult would be overseen by a flamen. These flamines were given titles associated with their patron god-Emperor, with surviving examples including the flamen Augustalis, the flamen Tiberii Caesaris, and in the case that they oversaw the cults of multiple Emperors, the flamen Divorum Omnium ("priest of all the divine ones"). Their role in relation to living Emperors is uncertain, and officially-sanctioned worship of a living Emperor is not known to have ever occurred. Caesar may have been granted an active flamen while still alive, but evidence for this is tenuous.

Due to the continued importance of the deities represented by the original three maiores, it is likely that their offices continued to exist well into the Imperial period as well. At the very least, this was certainly the case for the flamen Dialis, whose last known incumbent was Terentius Gentianus, circa 211 AD.

== Flamines minores ==
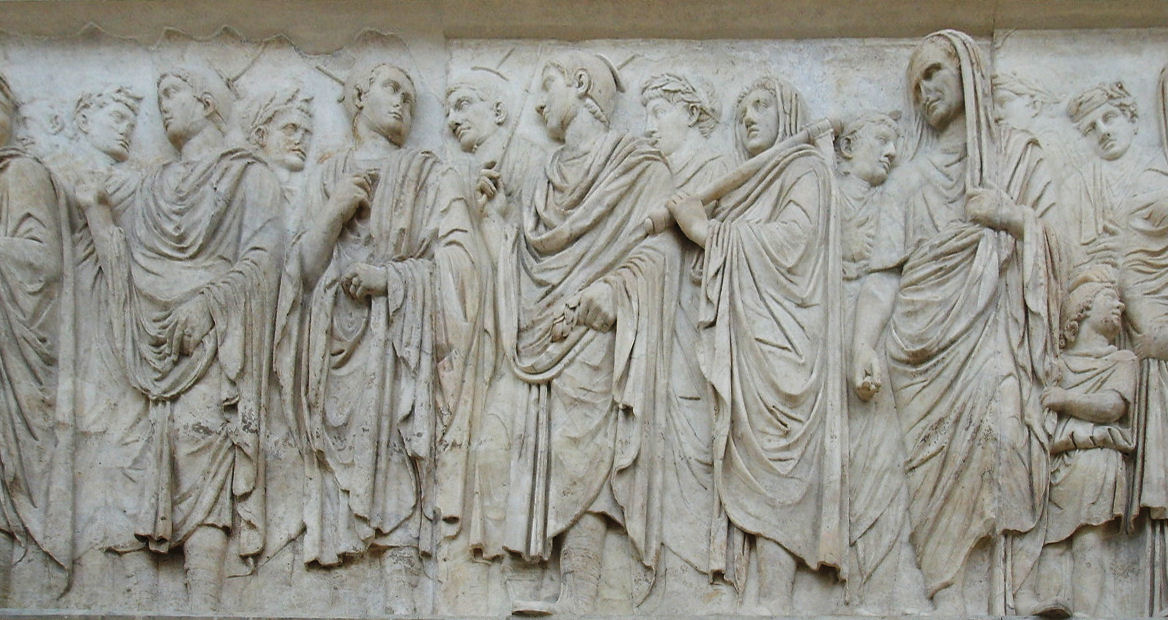
Flamines, distinguished by their pointed apices, as part of a procession on the Augustan Altar of Peace

The positions of the twelve flamines minores ("lesser priests") could be held by common plebeians. Some of the deities whose cult they tended were rather obscure, with their purposes evidently being rendered mostly obsolete by the end of the Roman Republic. Only ten are known by name with definitive certainty:

- The flamen Carmentalis oversaw the cult of Carmentis, goddess of childbirth and prophecy, also credited with creating the Latin alphabet.
- The flamen Cerealis oversaw the cult of Ceres, goddess of agriculture, fertility, and motherhood.
- The flamen Falacer oversaw the cult of Falacer, possibly an early Italic god of the sky, as his name may originate from the Etruscan word for "heavens".
- The flamen Floralis oversaw the cult of Flora, goddess of springtime and flowers.
- The flamen Furrinalis oversaw the cult of Furrina, possibly a goddess of water, particularly of springs.
- The flamen Palatualis oversaw the cult of Palatua, a goddess whose original purpose has largely been forgotten. It is only known that she was considered the guardian of the Palatine Hill's southern peak, potentially hinting at a connection to the earth, hills or mountains, or even the city of Rome itself. She may have also had ties to Pales, god of shepherds and livestock.
- The flamen Pomonalis oversaw the cult of Pomona, goddess of fruitful abundance and plenty.
- The flamen Portunalis oversaw the cult of Portunus, god of openings and gateways.
- The flamen Volcanalis oversaw the cult of Vulcan, god of fire.
- The flamen Volturnalis oversaw the cult of Volturnus, god of the wind or the Tiber River, possibly of all rivers.

There were an additional two flamines minores by the time of the Republican period, but their names and those of their respective deities are currently not known with any certainty. Based on references and clues in ancient sources, most of which are often contradictory, potential candidates for these final two flamines may include:

- the flamen Fontinalis for Fontus, god of wells and fountains;
- the flamen Larentialis for either the Lares, guardian deities, or Acca Larentia, goddess of fertility and caregiver to the infants Romulus and Remus;
- the flamen Neptunalis for Neptune, god of freshwater and the ocean;
- or the flamen Virbialis for Virbius, an obscure forest god.

Another less likely candidate cited by some scholars is the flamen Lavinialis, who was potentially dedicated to Lavinia, the final wife of the legenary Roman progenitor Aeneas. However, if a flamen with such a title did exist, he more likely would have been a municipal priest for the nearby port city of Lavinium, supposedly founded by Aeneas in honor of his wife. Similarly, the previously mentioned flamen Larentialis, or Laurentialis, could have simply been a priest who served Laurentum, another nearby city significant to the legends of Rome's foundation.

The flamines Floralis and Pomonalis are not recorded in calendars as their festivals were moveable. Some information exists for the ritual roles of the Portunalis in connection with the cult of the god Quirinus, and the Volcanalis in connection with the cult of the goddess Maia on the Kalends of May. Also preserved is the list of deities invoked by the Cerealis when he officiated sacrifices to the goddesses Ceres and Tellus. (Note: This list was contained in the lost treatise De jure pontificio by Quintus Fabius Pictor, which was in turn recorded by Varro and through Servius later preserved by Christian theologian Augustine in De civitate Dei.)

As the flamines minores mostly seem to be connected to aspects of nature or older Italic deities, the increased urbanization and diversification of the Roman populace may explain why these deities and their respective flamines eventually lost their significance or fell into obscurity.
