= Confarreatio =

Patrician marriage in ancient Rome

Ancient Roman marriage (Baths of Diocletian Museum, Rome)

In ancient Rome, confarreatio was a traditional patrician form of marriage. The ceremony involved the bride and bridegroom sharing a cake of emmer, in Latin far or panis farreus, hence the rite's name. Far is often translated as "spelt", which is inaccurate as the grain used was Triticum dicoccum (emmer), not Triticum spelta. The Flamen Dialis and pontifex maximus presided over the wedding, and ten witnesses had to be present. The woman passed directly from the hand (manus) of her father or head of household (the pater familias) to that of her new husband.

Having parents who were married by confarreatio was a prerequisite for becoming a Vestal or the Flamen Dialis. Confarreatio seems to have been limited to those whose parents were also married by confarreatio, but later, perhaps with the rise of plebeian nobiles, this requirement must have been relaxed. Scipio Africanus presumably married his wife Aemilia Tertia by confarreatio, because their elder son was Flamen Dialis; yet Scipio's mother Pomponia was a plebeian.

Divorce for confarreatio marriages, diffarreatio, was a difficult process and therefore rare. Not much is known about how diffarreatio was carried out except that there was a special type of sacrifice that caused the dissolution of the relationship between the man and woman. She would then pass back into the manus of her paterfamilias.

Originally, the confarreatio was indissoluble, and this remained true of the marriage of the Flamen Dialis. The other two major flamines, the Flamen Martialis and the Flamen Quirinalis, were also required to marry by confarreatio. The three major flamines were also required to marry virgins; further, if the wife of the Flamen Dialis died, he was immediately required to resign. It is not clear if this was true of the other priests.

== See also ==
- Manus marriage
- Marriage in ancient Rome
