= Falacer =

Ancient Italic god

Falacer, or more fully dīvus pater falacer, was an ancient Italic god, according to Varro. Hartung is inclined to consider him an epithet of Jupiter, since falandum, according to Festus, was the Etruscan name for "heaven."

Although his origin is obscure, he was at one time considered important enough to have his own flamen.

His name may appear in the name of the city of Falacrine (Latin: Falacrīnum or Phalacrīna). The name also has a correlation with Falerii and the Falisci, and so it has been suggested that Falacer may have been the eponymous ancestor of these ancient tribes.
