= Flora (mythology) =

Roman goddess of flowers and spring

- Goddess of flowers and spring
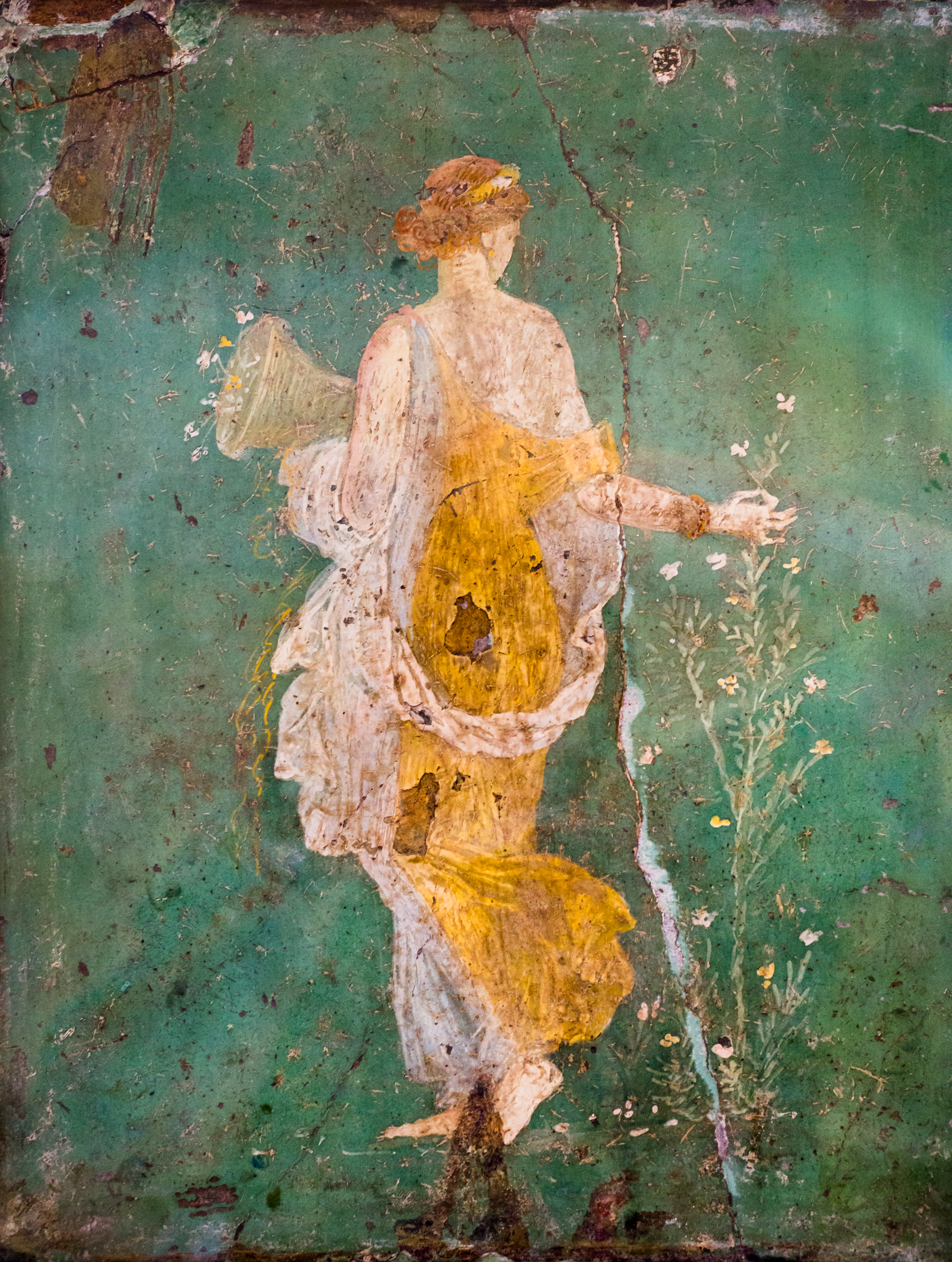
- 1st-century fresco from the Villa di Arianna in Stabiae, depicting Flora or an allegory of spring
- Abode: Elysium
- Symbols: flower
- Festivals: Floralia

Genealogy
- Consort: Favonius–Zephyrus
- Children: Carpus

Equivalents
- Greek: Chloris

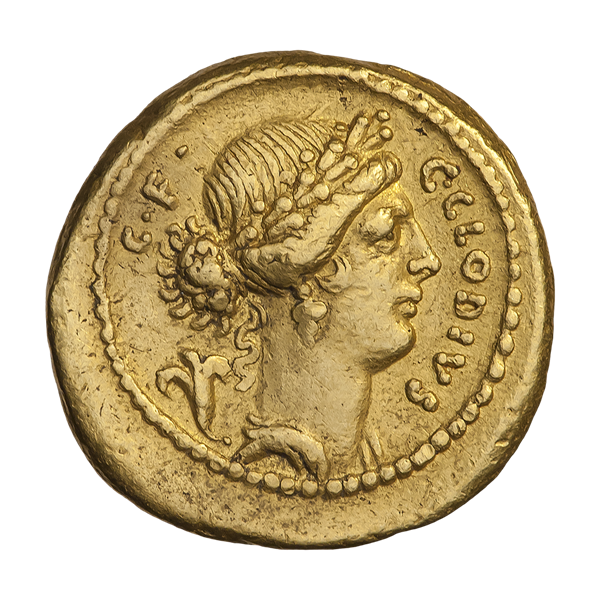
Flora on a gold aureus of 43–39 BCE

Flora (Latin: Flōra) is a Roman goddess of flowers and spring. She was one of the twelve deities of traditional Roman religion who had their own flamen, the Floralis, one of the flamines minores. Her association with spring gave her particular importance at the coming of springtime, as did her role as goddess of youth. She is one of several fertility goddesses and a relatively minor figure in Roman mythology. Her Greek counterpart is Chloris.

== Etymology ==
The name Flōra descends from Proto-Italic *flōsā ('goddess of flowers'), itself a derivation from Proto-Italic *flōs ('flower'; cf. Latin flōs, flōris 'blossom, flower'). It is cognate with the Oscan goddess of flowers Fluusa, demonstrating that the cult had spread across the Italic peoples. The name ultimately derives from Proto-Indo-European *bʰleh₃- ('bloom, flower'). Compare the name of the goddess Aurora, which shows a similar a-extension.

== Festivals and temples ==
Flora's festival, the Floralia, was held between April 28 and May 3 and was celebrated with drinking, flowers, and entertainments (ludi). The festival was first instituted in 240 BCE, and on the advice of the Sibylline books, she was also given a temple in 238 BCE. At the festival, with the men decked in flowers, and the women wearing normally forbidden gay costumes, five days of farces and mimes were enacted – ithyphallic, and including nudity when called for – followed by a sixth day of the hunting of goats and hares. On May 23 another flower festival was held, the Rosalia.

== Mythology ==
The cult of Flora was evidently ancient, as Varro—a 1st-century BCE Roman author—reports that king Titus Tatius had dedicated an altar to her in Rome. Ennius, a 2nd-century BCE Roman poet, is recorded by Varro to have claimed that the king Numa Pompilius created the office of the flamen floralis. Her cult likely was also greatly respected in ancient Rome; the 1st-century BCE poet Lucretius describes a procession of the seasons wherein Flora occupies an important role pertaining to spring. Ovid, a 1st-century BCE Roman poet, does describe a purported brief lapse in the popularity of her cult, in response to which Flora supposedly decided to withdraw her protection of agriculture from any misfortune.

=== Interpretatio graeca ===
Flora's Greek equivalent is the nymph Chloris, whose myths were assimilated to Flora in mythological narratives (interpretatio graeca). The Hellenized Flora was married to Favonius, the wind god also known as Zephyr, and her companion was Hercules. According to the legend, Flora ran away from Favonius, but he caught her, married her and gave her dominion over the flowers.

== In the classical tradition ==
=== Music ===
Flora is the main character of the 1894 ballet The Awakening of Flora.

=== In painting ===
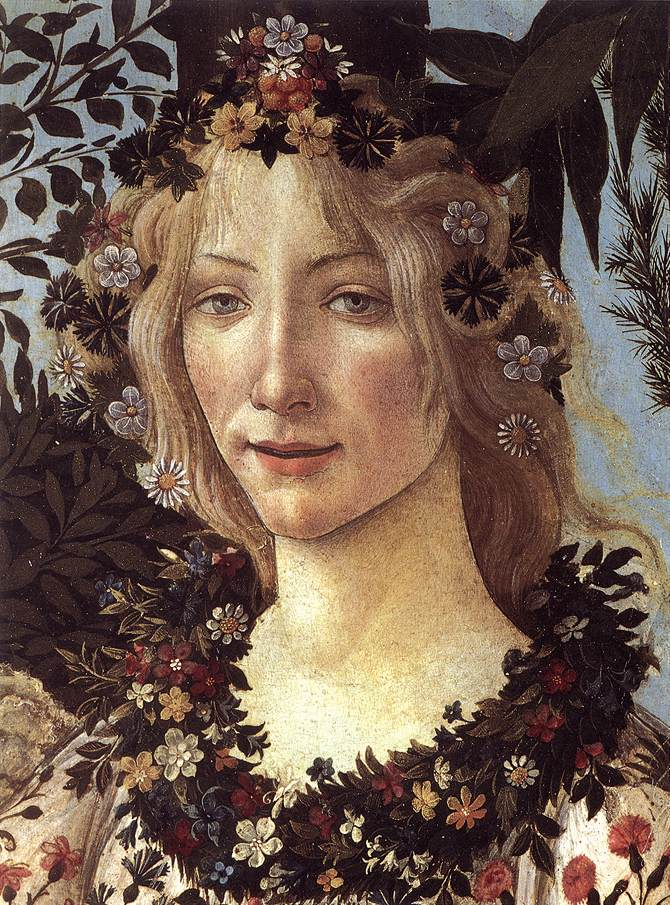
Detail of Flora from Primavera by Botticelli, c. 1482

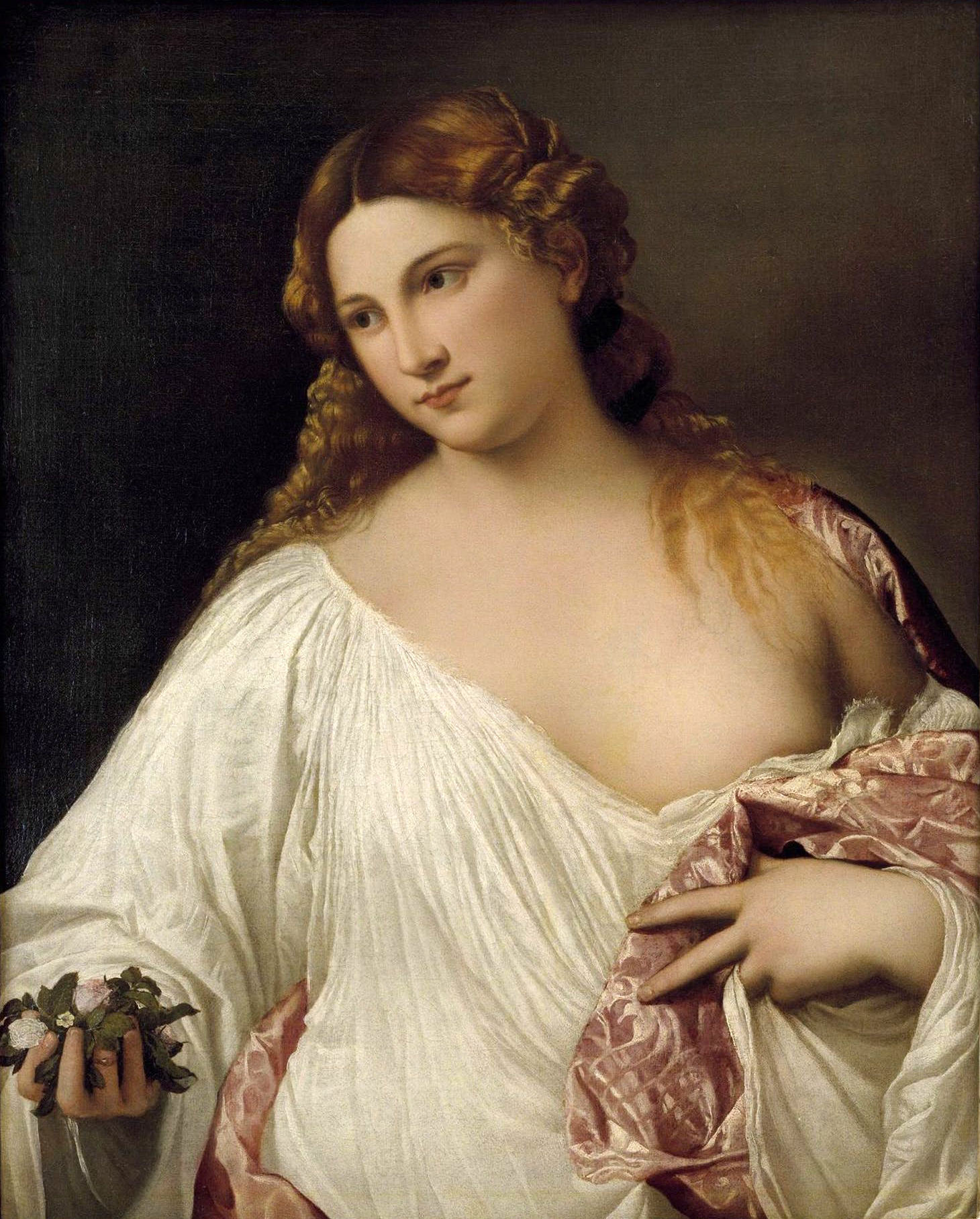
Flora by Titian, 1515

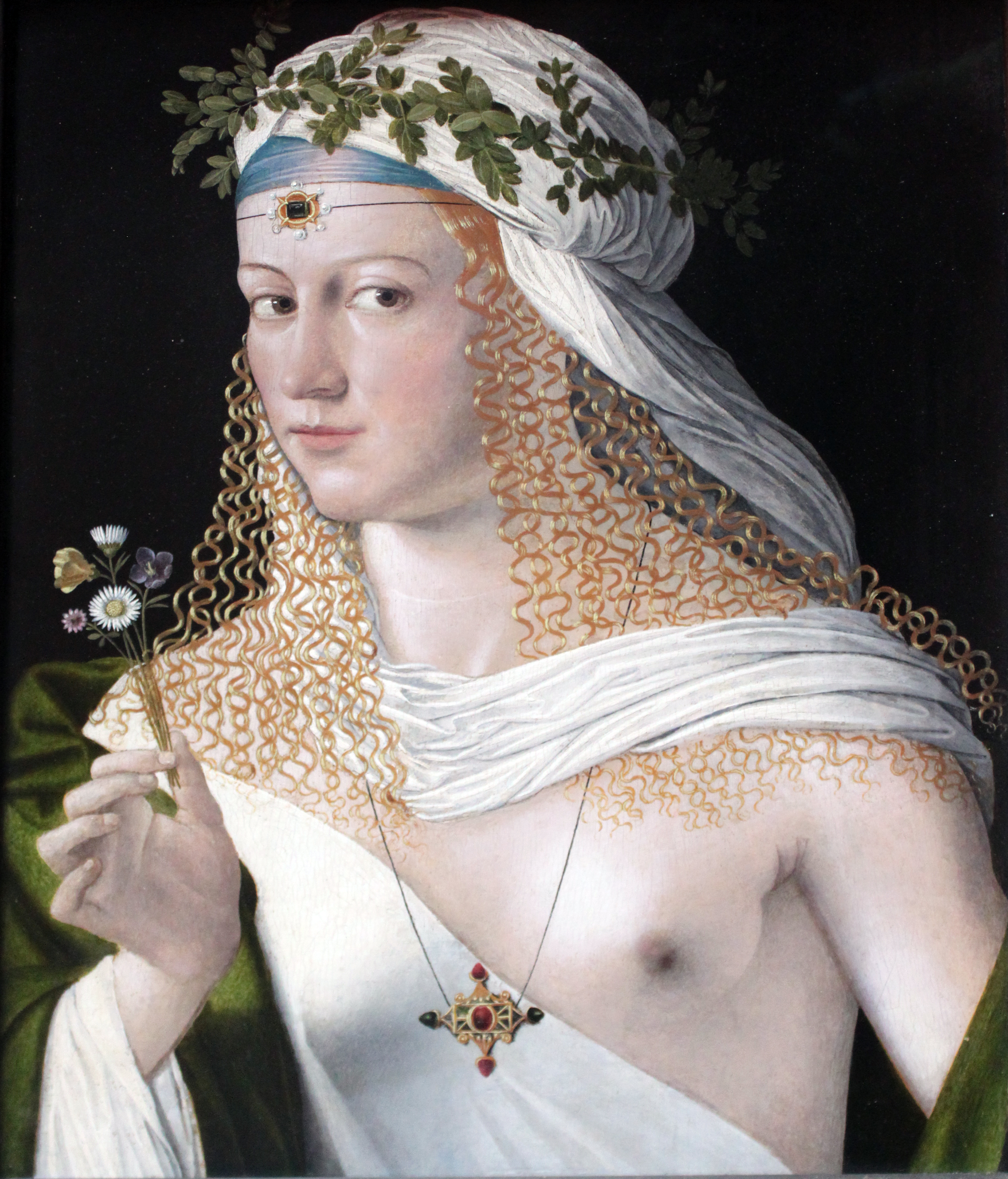
Idealized Portrait of a Courtesan as Flora by Bartolomeo Veneto, c. 1520

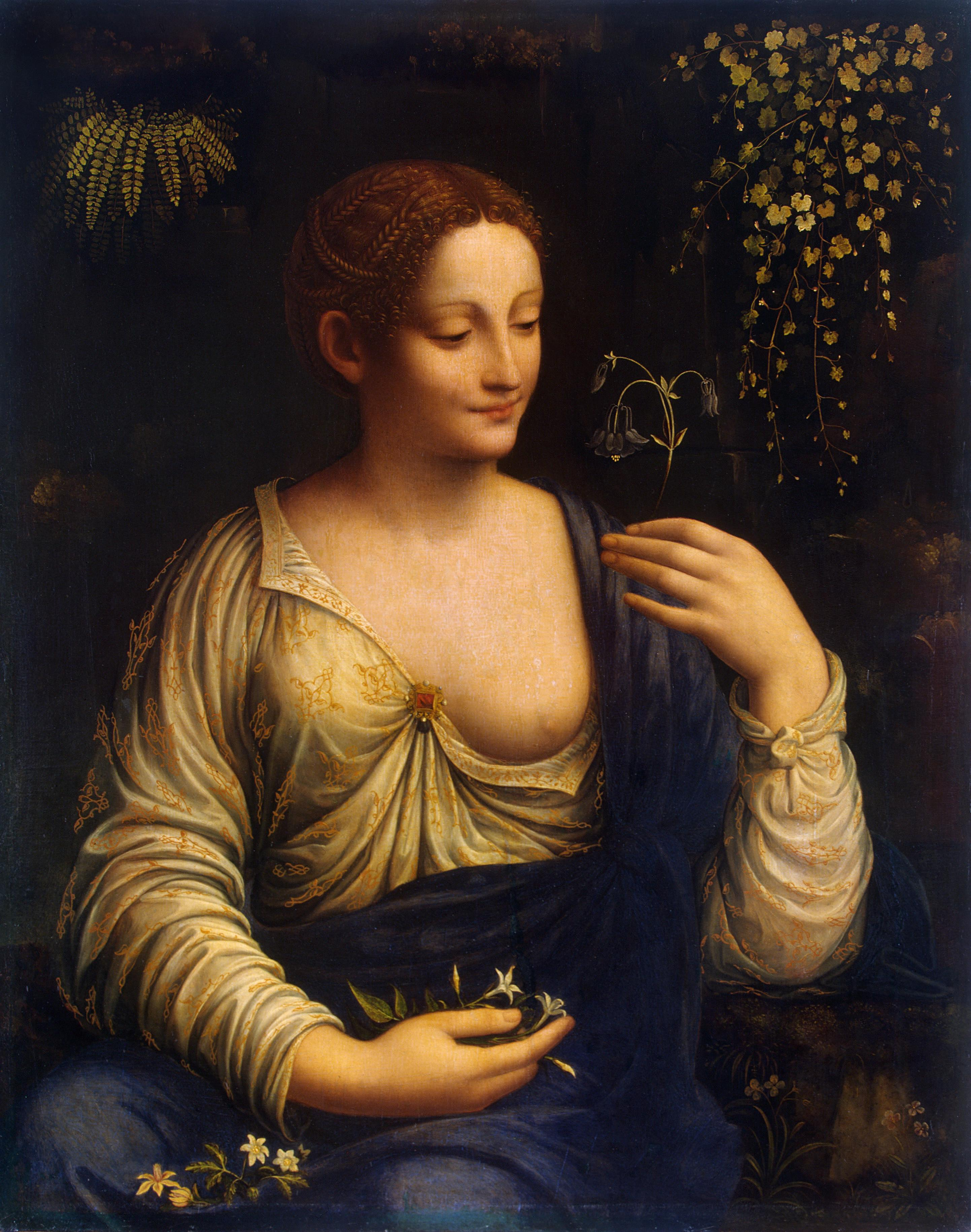
Flora by Francesco Melzi, c. 1520

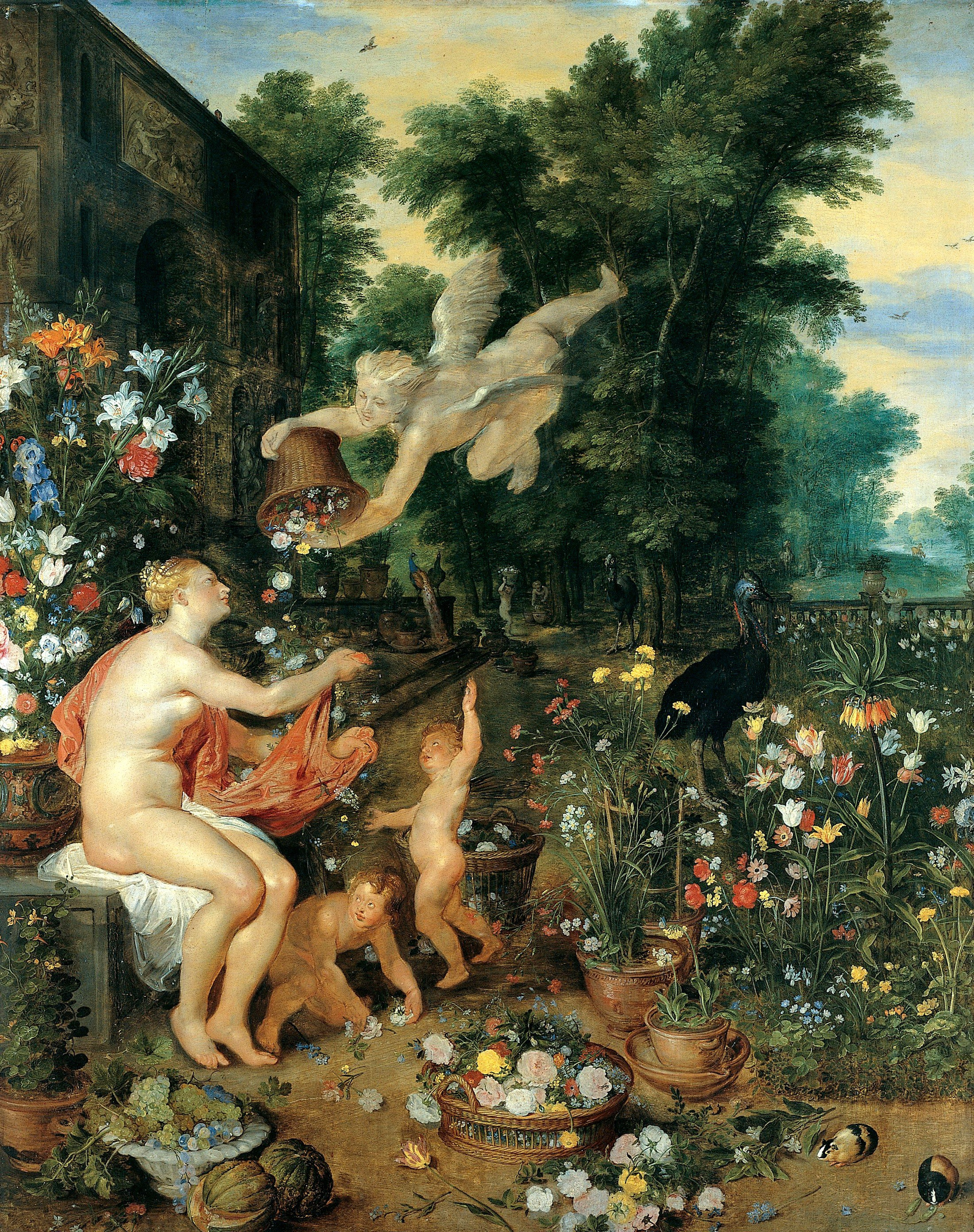
Flora and Zephyr, by Jan Brueghel the Elder and Peter Paul Rubens, 1617

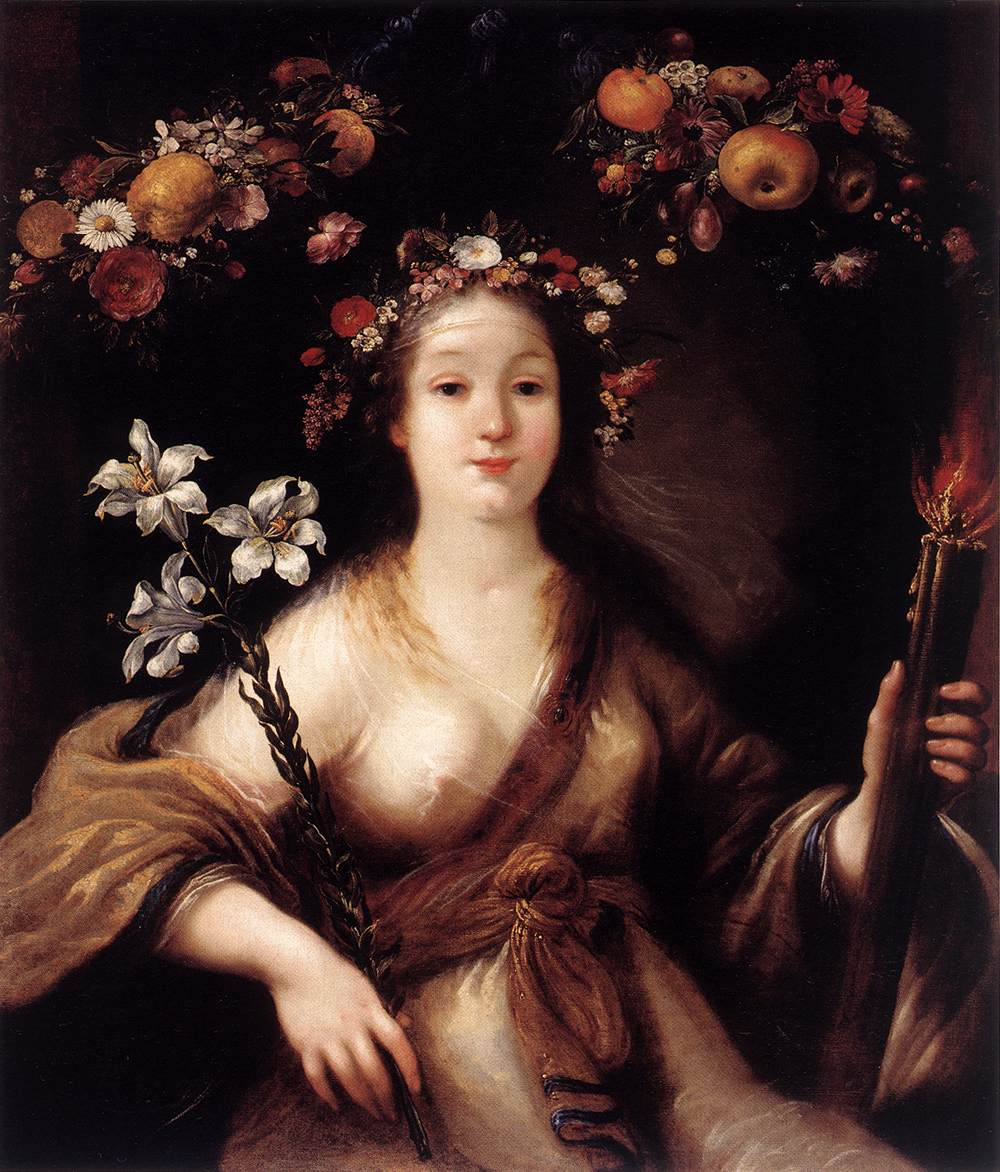
Flora by Claude Vignon, 1650

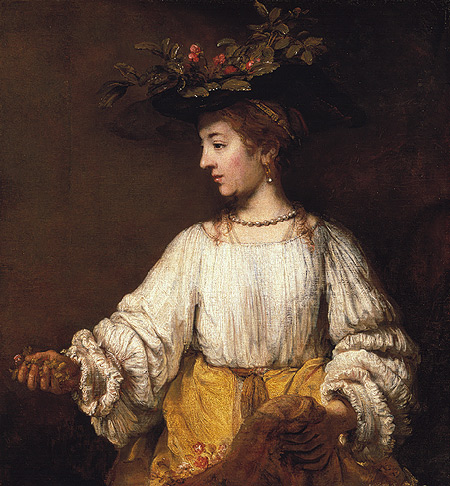
Flora by Rembrandt, 1654

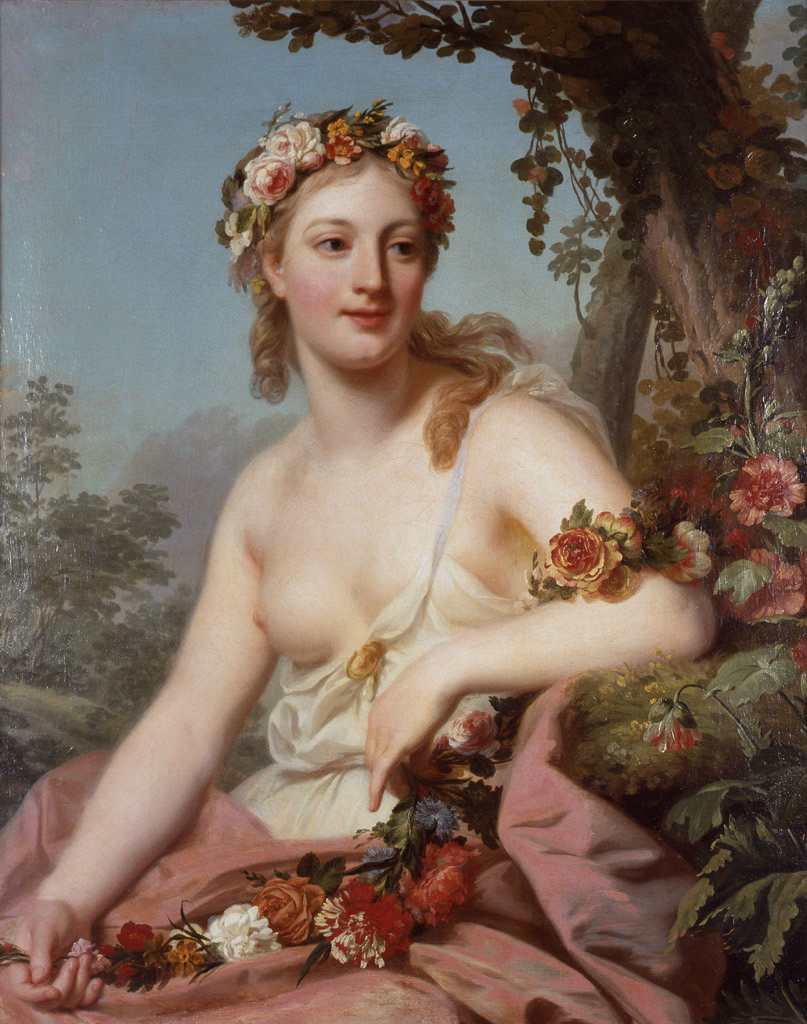
Flora or Hebe by Alexander Roslin, 18th century

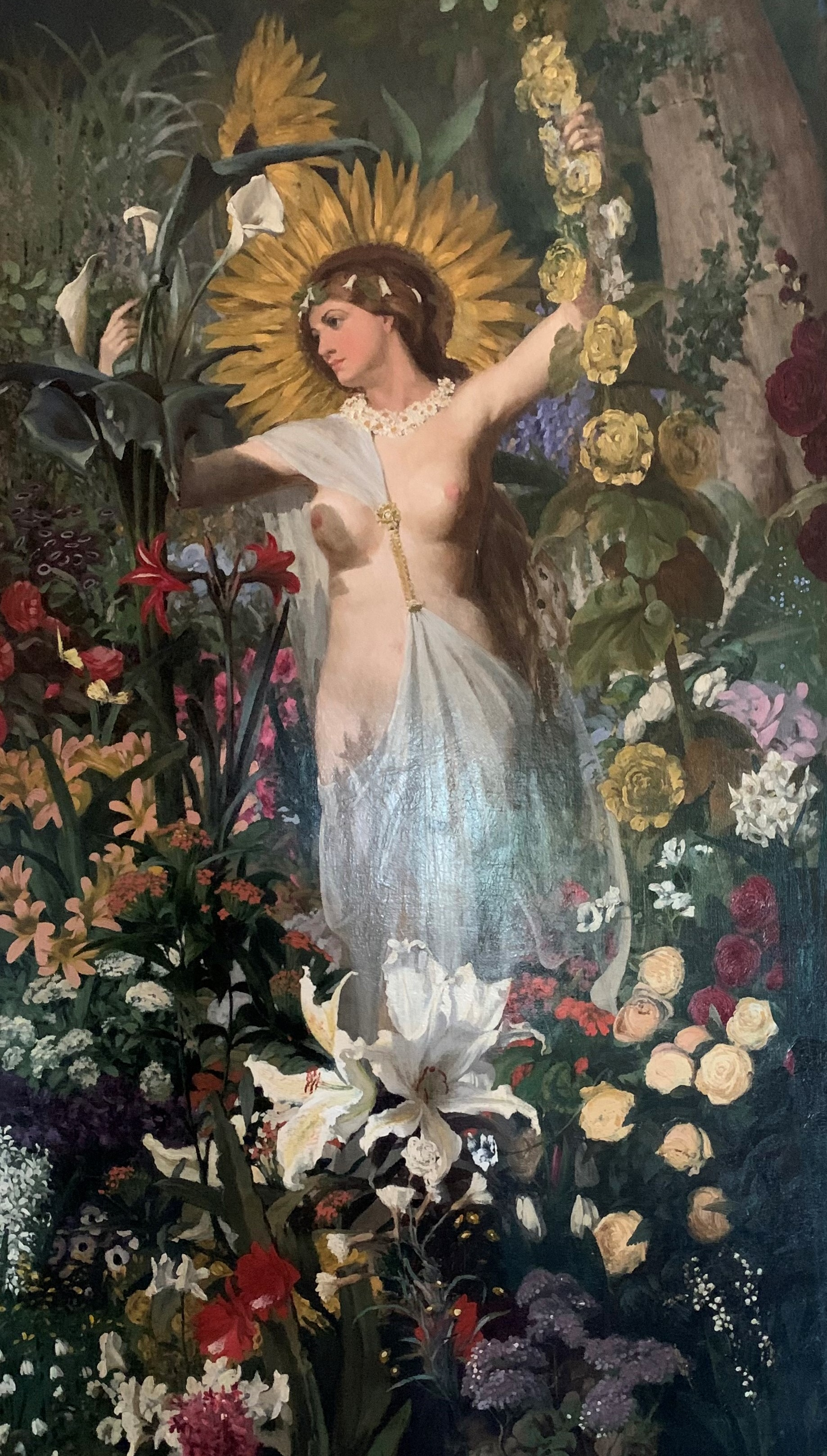
Flora by Valentine Walter Bromley, 1874

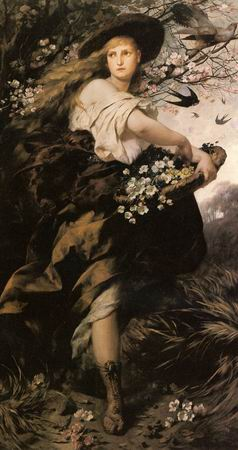
Flora by Ferdinand Keller, 1883

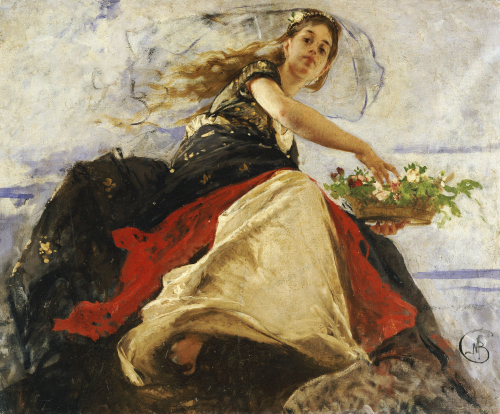
Flora by Mosè Bianchi, 1890

=== Sculpture ===
There are many monuments to Flora, for example in Rome (Italy), Valencia (Spain), and Szczecin (Poland).

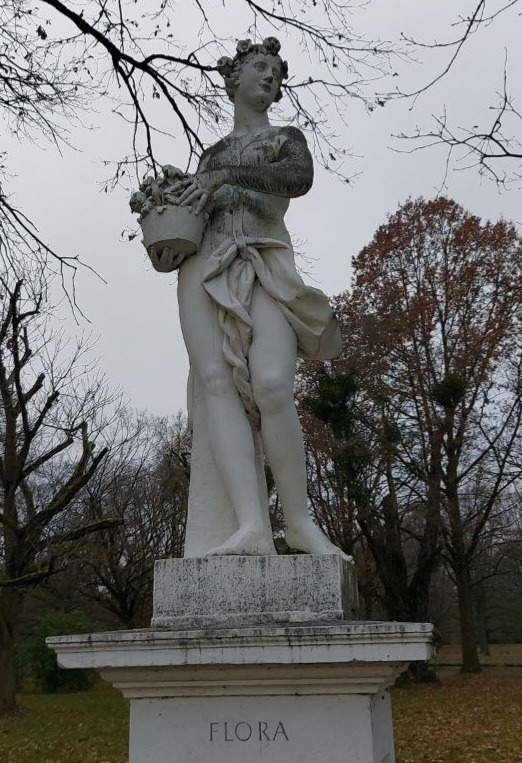
statue of Flora at Orangerie Kassel, around 1703

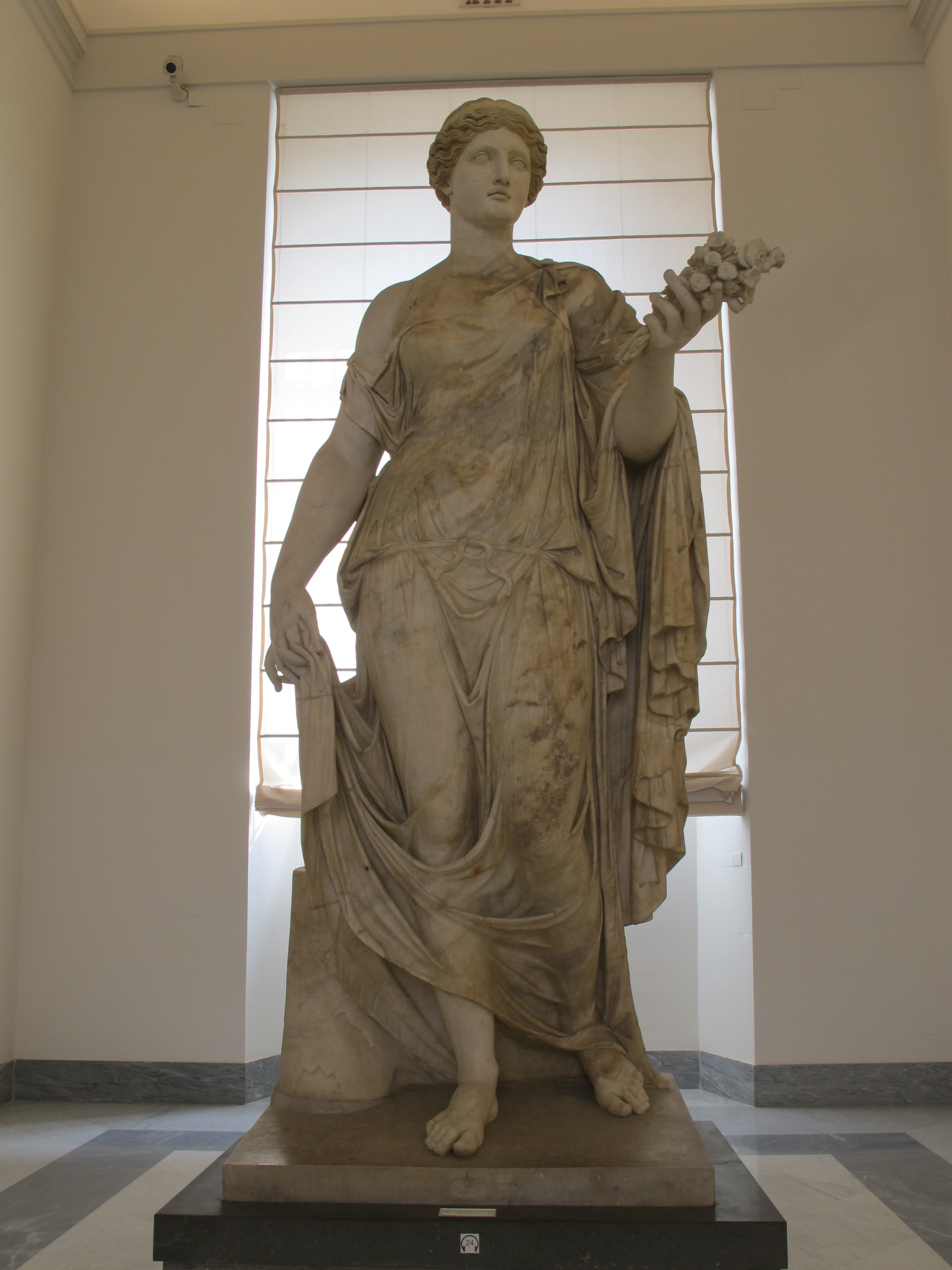
Flora Farnese (Naples), mid-18th century AD

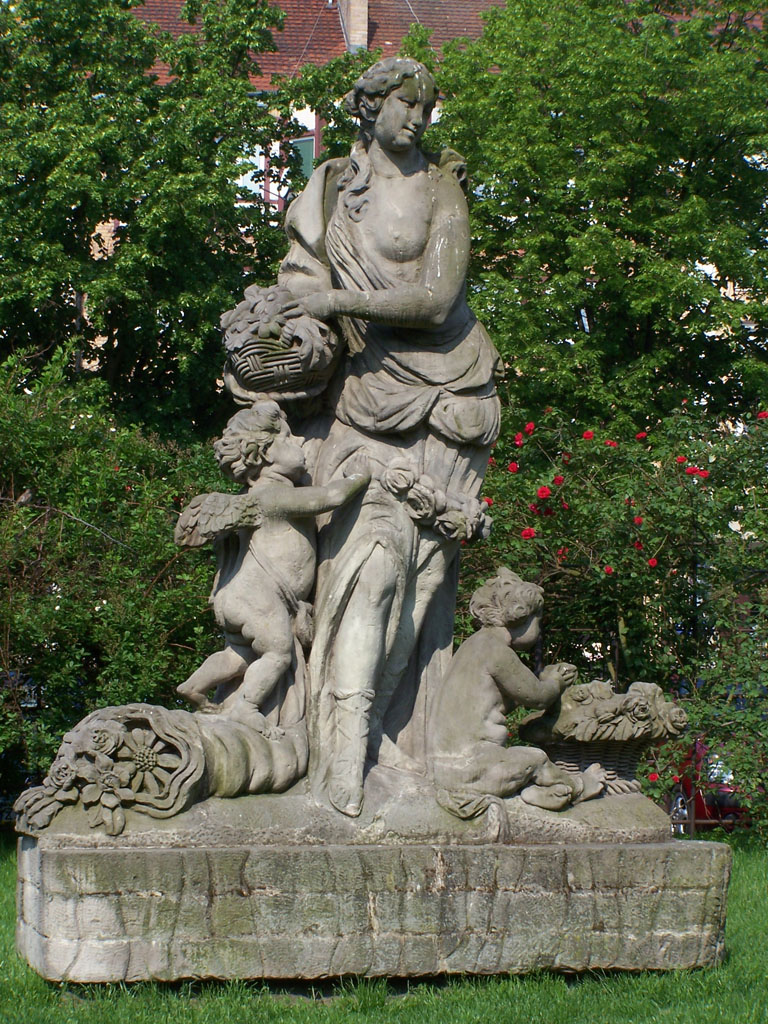
Statue of Flora in Szczecin, Poland, 1730.

== See also ==
- Abundantia
- Feronia
- Flora Fountain
- Fauna
- Nymph
- Pomona
- 8 Flora
