= Flamen Martialis =

High priest of Mars in ancient Rome

In ancient Roman religion, the Flamen Martialis was the high priest of the official state cult of Mars, the god of war. He was one of the flamines maiores, the three high priests who were the most important of the fifteen flamens. The Flamen Martialis would have led public rites on the days sacred to Mars. Among his duties was the ritual brandishing of the sacred spears of Mars when the Roman army was preparing for war.

Like other flamines maiores, the high priest of Mars was a patrician and required to marry through the ceremony of confarreatio. His wife functioned as an assistant priestess with the title Flaminicia Martialis. It is not clear whether the death of his wife required him to resign his duties, as was the case for the Flamen Dialis.

== Role ==
At the Larentalia in April, the Flamen Martialis poured libations in honour of Acca Laurentia, wife of Faustulus, the foster-father of the Rome's twin founders, Romulus and Remus. It is assumed by modern scholars, though nowhere specifically stated in any ancient source, that the Flamen Martialis presided over the October Horse, a sacrifice of a horse to Mars in the Campus Martius.

The major flamines were placed under several religious prohibitions that restricted their military and political careers. In the 240s BC, for instance, the consul Aulus Postumius Albinus could not assume his military command, because the pontifex maximus Lucius Caecilius Metellus invoked the prohibition against a Flamen Martialis leaving the city. The Flamines Martiales were likely appointed by the pontifex maximus and initiated by an augur in the comitia calata. Members of the Flamines Martiales may have had their term end when their wife died. The wife of a Flamen Martialis was also a priestess.

== List of Flamines Martiales ==
The priesthood was held for life; dates given below represent the year in which the priesthood is recorded.

- Aulus Postumius Albinus (consul 242 BC), c. 244 BC.
- Marcus Aemilius Regillus, d. 204 BC.
- Tiberius Veturius Philo, his successor in 204 BC.
- Publius Quinctilius Varus, d. 169 BC.
- Lucius Postumius Albinus, consul 154 BC, successor of the preceding in 168 until his death during his consulship.
- Lucius Valerius Flaccus, consul 131 BC. He probably succeeded L. Postumius Albinus in 154 BC.
- Lucius Valerius Flaccus, consul 100 BC and princeps senatus in 86 BC.
- Lucius Cornelius Lentulus Niger (d. 56 BC?), successor of the preceding in 69 BC, and notable for the detailed record of the pontifical dinner held for his inauguration.
- Lucius Cornelius Lentulus, c. 25 BC
- Gaius Junius Silanus, AD 10.
