= Calends =

First day of every month in the Roman calendar

The calends or kalends (Latin: kalendae) is the first day of every month in the Roman calendar. The English word "calendar" is derived from this word.

== Use ==
The Romans called the first day of every month the calends, signifying the start of a new lunar phase. On this day, the pontiffs would announce the number of days until the next month at the Curia Calabra; in addition, debtors had to pay off their debts on this day. These debts were inscribed in the kalendaria, effectively an accounting book.

Modern calendars count the number of days after the first of each month; by contrast, the Roman calendar counted the number of days until certain upcoming dates (such as the calends, the nones or the ides). The day before the calends was called pridie kalendas, but the day before that was counted as the "third day", as Romans used inclusive counting.

To calculate the day of the calends of the upcoming month, counting the number of days remaining in the current month is necessary, then adding two to that number. For example, April 22 is the 10th day before the calends of May (ante diem decimum Kalendas Maias/Maii), because eight days are left in April and both end dates are included in the total.

== Computation ==
The following lines of poetry aid calculations relating to the day of the month from the calends:

Principium mensis cujusque vocato kalendas:
Sex Maius nonas, October, Julius, et Mars;
Quattuor at reliqui: dabit idus quidlibet octo.

This means that the first day is called the calends; six days after the calends is the nones of May, October, July and March, while the nones comes only four days later for the other months; the ides comes eight days after the nones.

== Expressions ==
The calends was a feature of the Roman calendar, but it was not included in the Greek calendar. Consequently, to postpone something ad Kalendas Graecas ("until the Greek calends") was a colloquial expression for postponing something forever. This phrase survived for many centuries in Greek (Ancient Greek: εἰς τὰς ἑλληνικὰς καλένδας) and in the Romance languages (Spanish: hasta las calendas griegas; Italian: alle calende greche; French: aux calendes grecques; Romanian: la calendele grecești; Portuguese: às calendas gregas ; etc.).

The Latin term is traditionally written with initial K: this is a relic of traditional Latin orthography, which wrote K (instead of C or Q) before the vowel A. Later, most Latin words adopted C, instead. It is sometimes claimed that the kalends was frequently used in formal or high-register contexts, and that that is why it retained its traditional spelling, but there seems to be no source for this.
