= Hostia gens =

Minor plebeian family of Rome

The gens Hostia was an obscure plebeian family at ancient Rome. Few members of this gens are mentioned by Roman writers, of whom the best known is the poet Hostius, but many more are known from inscriptions.

== Origin ==
The nomen Hostius is a patronymic surname derived from the old praenomen Hostus, which also gave rise to the nomen Hostilius. Chase classifies it among those gentilicia that were either of Roman origin, or are found at Rome, and cannot be shown to have come from anywhere else.

== Praenomina ==
The chief praenomina of the Hostii were Gaius, Marcus, and Quintus, amongst the most common names at all periods of Roman history. There are multiple examples of other common names, including Publius and Lucius, but individual Hostii sometimes bore more distinctive praenomina, including Decimus, Numerius, and Tiberius.

== Branches and cognomina ==
The Hostii known from epigraphy do not appear to have used any hereditary cognomina, and may not have been divided into distinct families. However, persons of this name appear to have settled at Casilinum in Campania by the end of the second century BC, and subsequently a number lived at Puteoli. Most of the inscriptions of this gens are from Rome, Latium, and Campania.

== Members ==
This list includes abbreviated praenomina. For an explanation of this practice, see filiation.

- Hostius, author of the poem Bellum Histricum, on the Third Illyrian War. The poem has been lost, except for a few lines quoted by Festus, Macrobius, and Servius. The period to which Hostius belongs is very uncertain, save that he lived before Vergil; but due to the relative obscurity of the war, he may have been alive at the time it occurred.
- Tiberius Hostius, one of the builders of an amphitheatre at Casilinum in Campania, according to an inscription dating between 108 and 105 BC.
- Quintus Hostius Q. f., one of a number of builders listed for the temple of Castor and Pollux and Mercury at Casilinum in Campania, according to a dedicatory inscription dating from 105 BC.
- Gaius Hostius L. f., buried at Rome, in a tomb dating from the first century BC, along with Titus Perperna Quadra, a master of scribes.
- Gaius Hostius Secundus, named in a first-century BC inscription from Casilinum, along with Titus Pompennius Chrysogonus and Gaius Hostius Suavis.
- Gaius Hostius Suavis, named in a first-century BC inscription from Casilinum, along with Titus Pompennius Chrysogonus and Gaius Hostius Secundus.
- Gaius Hostius M. l. Hermia, a freedman, was one of the builders of a wall in the temple of Juno at Casilinum in 71 BC.
- Gaius Hostius C. l. Pamphilus, a freedman and physician, dedicated a sepulchre at Rome, dating between the middle of the first century BC and the early first century AD, for himself, the freedwoman Nelpia Hymnis, and their family.
- Hostia, according to Apuleius, the real name of Cynthia, the woman to whom Propertius addressed throughout his poetry. Vossius supposed that she was the daughter of the poet Hostius, while other scholars are unconvinced, and some have proposed that Cynthia was a purely literary figure, instead of an actual woman.
- Marcus Hostius M. l. Bithus, one of a large number of freedman named in an inscription from Ephesus in Asia, dating from 35 BC.
- Hostia, named in an inscription from Volaterrae in Etruria, dating from the late first century BC, or early first century AD.
- Hostia M. M. l. Lycninis, a freedwoman buried at Casilinum, in a tomb dedicated by her husband, the freedman Marcus Hostius Cerdo, and dating from the late first century BC or the early first century AD.
- Marcus Hostius M. l. Cerdo, a freedman, who dedicated a late first-century BC or early first century tomb at Casilinum for his wife, the freedwoman Hostia Lycninis.
- Quintus Hostius Q. l. Eros, a freedman inurned at Atella in Campania, during the late first century BC or early first century AD.
- Quintus Hostius Q. f. Capito, a rhetorician named in an inscription from Nemus Dianae in Latium, dating from the first half of the first century.
- Gaius Hostius Primigenius, buried at Casilinum, along with a number of freedmen, in a tomb dating from the first half of the first century.
- Hostia M. l. Soteris, a freedwoman named in a sepulchral inscription from Rome, dating from the first half of the first century.
- Gaius Hostius, buried at Abellinum in Campania, along with Gaius Tullius Clemens, in a tomb dedicated by Spedia Clara, and dating from the early or middle first century.
- Marcus Hostius M. M. l. Eros, a freedman, named along with the freedman Marcus Munatius Dardanus, in a first-century sepulchral inscription from Puteoli in Campania.
- Gaius Hostius Mercator, named in a first-century sepulchral inscription from Puteoli.
- Hostia Tyche, along with Quintus Numisius Maritimus, perhaps her husband, dedicated a first- or second-century sepulchre at Rome for themselves and their household.
- Hostia Alce, buried at Rome, in a tomb dedicated by her maternal uncle, Nicander, and dating from the latter half of the first century.
- Hostia C. f. Propinqua, inurned at Rome, along with Manlia Propinqua, aged seven years, eleven months, and twenty-two days, in a cinerarium dating between the middle of the first century and the early second.
- Hostia C. f. Asprilla, dedicated a second-century family sepulchre at Thessalonica in Macedonia for her parents, Gaius Hostius Felix and Hostia Prima, and brother, Gaius Hostius Erastus.
- Quintus Hostius Castianus, buried in a second-century tomb at Puteoli, in a tomb built by his brother and freedmen.
- Gaius Hostius C. f. Erastus, buried along with his parents, Gaius Hostius Felix and Hostia Prima, in a second-century family sepulchre at Thessalonica, built by his sister, Hostia Asprilla.
- Gaius Hostius Felix, buried along with his wife, Hostia Prima, and son, Gaius Hostius Erastus, in a second-century family sepulchre at Thessalonica, built by his daughter, Hostia Asprilla.
- Gaius Hostius Helius, dedicated a second-century tomb at Puteoli for his son, Gaius Hostius Protogenes.
- Hostia C. l. Prima, a freedwoman buried along with her husband, Gaius Hostius Felix, and son, Gaius Hostius Erastus, in a second-century family sepulchre at Thessalonica, built by her daughter, Hostia Asprilla.
- Gaius Hostius C. f. Protogenes, a young man buried at Puteoli, aged nineteen, in a second-century tomb built by his father, Gaius Hostius Helius.
- Hostius Laetus, dedicated a tomb at Rudiae in Calabria, dating from the latter half of the second century, for his wife, Clodia Junix, aged fifty.
- Hostia Vitalis, dedicated a tomb at Casilinum, dating between the middle of the second century and the end of the third, for her daughter, Hostia Felicissima.
- Hostia Felicissima, buried at Casilinum, aged twenty-four years, eight months, and twenty-one days, in a tomb built by her mother, Hostia Vitalis, and dating between the middle of the second century and the end of the third.
- Quintus Hostius Fortunatus, a beneficiarius in the service of the governor of Pannonia Inferior, made a libation in honor of Jupiter Optimus Maximus at Aquincum, between the late second century and the middle of the third.

=== Undated Hostii ===
- Hostia, named along with Hostius Philonicus in a sepulchral inscription from Rome.
- Hostia, named in a sepulchral inscription from Ostia in Latium.
- Marcus Hostius Anteros, a freedman named in a sepulchral inscription from Rome.
- Publius Hostius Festus, along with his wife, Cerenia Grapte, built a tomb at Rome for their son, Publius Hostius Severus.
- Lucius Hostius L. l. Gentilis, a freedman named in an inscription from Fundi in Latium.
- Hostia Helena, named in a sepulchral inscription from Rome, along with the thurarius, or frankincense dealer, Lucius Faenius Primus, perhaps her husband. The inscription may be a forgery.
- Decimus Hostius Heraclida, made a sacrifice at Ostia.
- Gaius Hostius Hilarus, buried at Rome.
- Numerius Hostius Q. l. Nicostratus, a freedman named in a sepulchral inscription from Rome.
- Hostius Philonicus, named along with Hostia in a sepulchral inscription from Rome.
- Quintus Hostius Q. f. Pollio, named in a sepulchral inscription from Alexandria Troas in Asia.
- Marcus Hostius Ɔ. l. Sampseros, a feedman buried in a family sepulchre at Rome.
- Publius Hostius P. f. Severus, a youth buried at Rome, aged thirteen years, ten days, in a tomb built by his parents, Publius Hostius Festus and Cerenia Grapte.
- Hostia Spes, the wife of Publius Hostius Thallus, with whom she dedicated a sepulchre at Rome for one of their children, and the rest of their family.
- Hostia Tertulla, buried at Rome, in a tomb built by her mother, Consia Casta.
- Hostia Thaïs, buried at Rome, aged twenty-eight, in a tomb built by her husband, Tiberius Claudius Heracla.
- Publius Hostius Thallus, the husband of Hostia Spes, with whom he dedicated a sepulchre at Rome for one of their children, and the rest of their family.

== See also ==
- List of Roman gentes

== Bibliography ==
- Lucius Apuleius, Apologia.
- Sextus Pompeius Festus, Epitome de M. Verrio Flacco de Verborum Significatu (Epitome of Marcus Verrius Flaccus' On the Meaning of Words).
- Servius, Ad Virgilii Aeneidem Commentarii (Commentary on Vergil's Aeneid).
- Ambrosius Theodosius Macrobius, Saturnalia.
- Gerardus Vossius, De Historicis Latinis (The Latin Historians), Jan Maire, Brittenburg (1627).
- Poëtarum Latinorum Reliquiae (Surviving Works of Latin Poets), August Weichert, ed., B. G. Teubner, Leipzig (1830).
- Dictionary of Greek and Roman Biography and Mythology, William Smith, ed., Little, Brown and Company, Boston (1849).
- Theodor Mommsen et alii, Corpus Inscriptionum Latinarum (The Body of Latin Inscriptions, abbreviated CIL), Berlin-Brandenburgische Akademie der Wissenschaften (1853–present).
- Wilhelm Henzen, Ephemeris Epigraphica: Corporis Inscriptionum Latinarum Supplementum (Journal of Inscriptions: Supplement to the Corpus Inscriptionum Latinarum), Institute of Roman Archaeology, Rome (1872–1913).
- Adolf Kirchhoff, Ulrich von Wilamowitz-Moellendorff, et alii, Inscriptiones Graecae (Greek Inscriptions), Berlin-Brandenburgische Akademie der Wissenschaften (1878–present).
- René Cagnat et alii, L'Année épigraphique (The Year in Epigraphy, abbreviated AE), Presses Universitaires de France (1888–present).
- George Davis Chase, "The Origin of Roman Praenomina", in Harvard Studies in Classical Philology, vol. VIII, pp. 103–184 (1897).
- Atti della Accademia Nazionale dei Lincei (Acts of the Lincean Academy, 1901).
- Antonella Romualdi, Villa Corsini a Castello, Florence (2009).
