= Battle of Lacus Curtius =

Final battle in the war between the Roman Kingdom and the Sabines in the 8th century BC

Battle of the Lacus Curtius
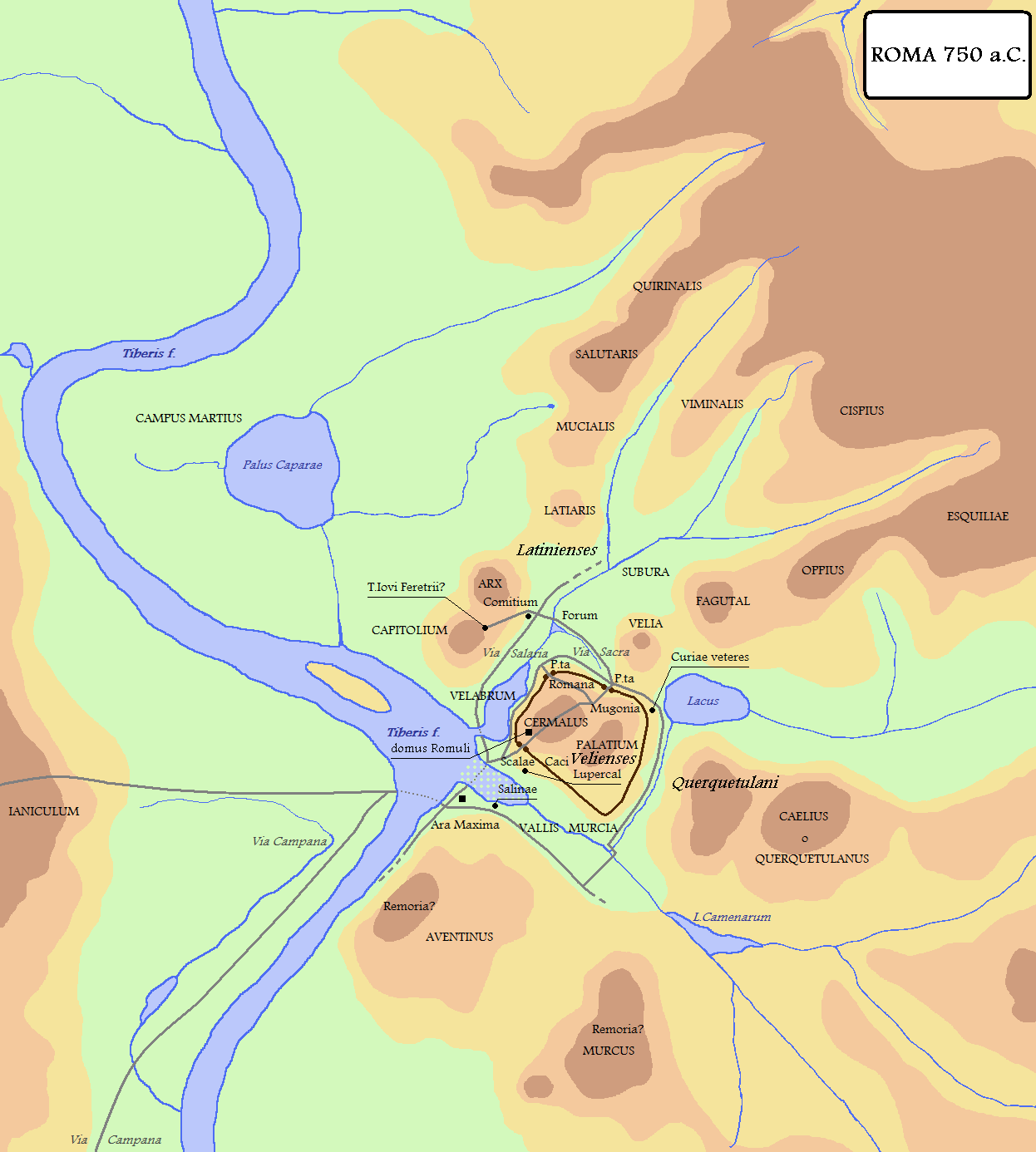
- Rome under the rule of Romulus
Date	During the reign of Romulus
Location	Near the Lacus Curtius of the Roman Forum, Rome
Result	See § Resolution

Belligerents
Roman Kingdom; Foreign mercenaries (under Lucumo); Alban auxiliaries	Sabines

Commanders and leaders
Romulus; Lucumo; Hostus Hostilius	Titus Tatius; Mettius Curtius

Strength
20,000 infantry; 800 cavalry	25,000 infantry; 1,000 cavalry

In Roman mythology, the Battle of the Lacus Curtius was the final battle in the war between the Roman Kingdom and the Sabines following Rome's mass abduction of Sabine women to take as brides. It took place during the reign of Romulus, near the Lacus Curtius, future site of the Roman Forum.

== Background ==
Rome was founded on the Palatine Hill. The settlement flourished and their strength and size came to rival those of their neighbors. The city needed more marriageable women and feared their growth couldn't be sustained if the female population did not increase. Romulus appealed to the other cities in the region:

Acting on the advice of the senate, Romulus sent envoys amongst the surrounding nations to ask for alliance and the right of intermarriage on behalf of his new community. [...] Nowhere did the envoys meet with a favourable reception. Whilst their proposals were treated with [contempt], there was at the same time a general feeling of alarm at the power so rapidly growing in their midst.

— Livy, Book I, Chapter 9, (translated by Rev. Canon Roberts)

With the Roman people outraged at the response, Romulus announced a festival to be held in the city and invited the citizens of Caenina, Antemnae, Crustumerium, and Sabinia. Once the festivities were underway, Romulus' men abducted the daughters of the Sabines and the other visitors. Afterwards, hostilities broke out between them. Rome defeated three of their enemies, at which point the Sabines declared war.

The two sides spent a year preparing. During this time Rome improved its defenses and were reinforced with Albans soldiers sent by King Numitor and mercenaries under the command of the Romulus' friend and renowned commander Lucumo. After a final effort to resolve the matter peacefully, the Sabine army marched forth.

== Battle ==
The Vestal Virgin Tarpeia, the daughter of the commander of the citadel in Rome Spurius Tarpeius, betrayed Rome to the Sabines, offering them entry into the city. Quoting Fabius and Cincius, Dionysius of Halicarnassus writes that Tatius tricked the daughter of the commander of the city's walled citadel to open the gates to his men by offering her what she thinks will be the gold bracelets they wear on their left arms, instead they crushed her to death when they heaped their shields on top of her as her reward. Lucius Piso claimed that she was motivated not by greed, but a plan to trick the Sabines and that she was killed only after they came to suspect her of treachery. Livy writes that the girl was simply bribed, but also cites the trickery account related by Dionysius.

The Sabine and Roman armies gathered at the Palatine and Capitoline Hills; the Sabines were commanded by Mettius Curtius and the Romans by Hostus Hostilius. The river had recently flooded and left a thick mud in the area,

After several skirmishes and minor engagements, the armies fought two pitched battles featuring valor and losses to both sides.

In the second and final battle between them, the armies met in between the two hills they occupied. Romulus and Lucumo were successfully attacking from both wings, but were forced to disengage when the center of the Roman line broke in order to stop the Sabines' advance under their general Mettius Curtius. After being turned back, the Sabines made an orderly retreat; Mettius and Romulus engaged one another directly until Mettius fell, wounded. A marshy lake prevented his escape but he plunged into it and stymied his enemy's pursuit. Once Romulus turned to face the remaining Sabines, the Sabine general pulled himself out of the mire and safely returned to his camp.

When Romulus was struck in the head with a stone, the tide reversed again as the soldiers lost heart without their commander. The army was in full-flight after a javelin felled Lucumo. Romulus recovered, and with the support of fresh reserves from within the city, the Romans regained the upper hand and the lines moved back against the Sabines. With the sun setting, the Sabines made an arduous retreat to the citadel and the Romans broke off their pursuit.

In Livy's account, the Romans assembled at the foot of the hill beneath the citadel, but the Sabines refused to emerge and engage them. Finally, in spite of their lack of the high ground, the frustrated Roman army attacked. Initially inspired by the heroics of their general Hostus Hostilius on the front line, the Roman line broke when he fell, Romulus makes a pledge to Jupiter that if he were to hold off the Sabine charge and restore the Roman's courage, he would build a new Temple to "Jupiter Stator" on the site. With a cry, Romulus led his army into the Sabines and routed them. The Sabine general Mettius was tossed in a swamp by his horse after it bolted.

== Resolution ==
After the Sabines regrouped, the battle continued in the area between the two hills, but the Roman army had by then gained the upper hand. Suddenly, the abducted Sabine daughters rushed onto the battlefield and put themselves between the two armies. They implored both sides to stop the bloodshed and accept each other as family, as they then were. Ashamed, the leaders of the two peoples ended the fighting.

In his account of the Battle of the Lacus Curtius, Plutarch provides additional details, but the basic account is the same as that of Livy and Dionysius. He notes that when the women intervened, they not only ended the battle, but brought food and water, as well as care for the injured. They also take the opportunity to introduce their husbands and their fathers. Henceforth, Sabine women have no duty but to spin wool for their husbands.

== Aftermath ==
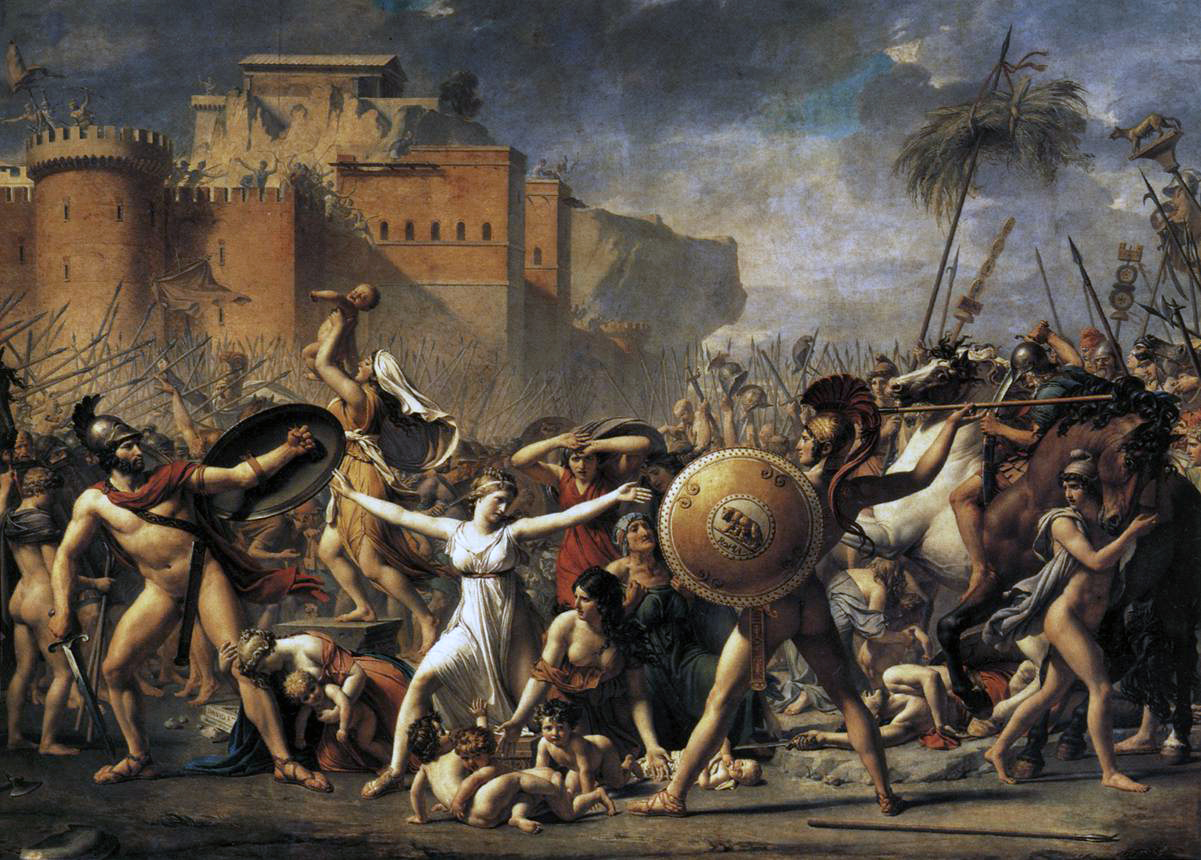
The Intervention of the Sabine Women, by Jacques-Louis David, 1799.

After the battle, both sides decided to sign a peace treaty uniting the two kingdoms transferring administrative power to Rome. Citizens of Rome became known as Quirites after the town Cures. The Lacus Curtius was named after Sabine leader Mettius Curtius.
