= Curtia gens =

Ancient Roman family

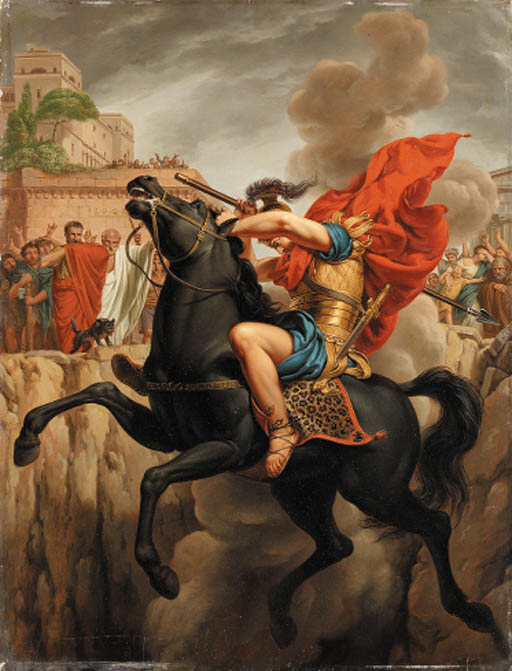
The Sacrifice of Marcus Curtius

The gens Curtia was an ancient but minor noble family at Rome, with both patrician and plebeian branches. The only member of the gens invested with the consulship under the Republic was Gaius Curtius Philo, in 445 BC. A few Curtii held lesser magistracies during the Republic, and there were two consuls suffectus in imperial times. However, the gens is best remembered from a series of legends dating from the traditional founding of the city to the early Republic.

== Origin ==
According to legend, Mettius Curtius was a leader of the Sabine forces who attacked Rome following the Rape of the Sabine Women. The first blows were exchanged between Curtius and the Roman warrior, Hostus Hostilius. After fierce fighting, Hostilius was slain and the Romans retreated, pursued by Curtius. Just then, the Roman King, Romulus, led his best troops against Curtius' advance. Pursued by the Romans, Curtius' horse was frightened by the shouting and plunged into the swamps, becoming mired in shallow water. Only with great effort was he able to free himself. Afterward, this stretch of water became known as the Lacus Curtius. In later times, the Lacus Curtius was drained and became part of the Roman Forum. Curtius' narrow escape is depicted on a relief, excavated in 1553 between the Column of Phocas and the Temple of Castor and Pollux, which seems to be a copy of an original dating perhaps to the 2nd century BC.

Besides the story of Mettius Curtius, two other legends derive the name of the lacus from later Curtii. In one account, the ground in the Forum gave way, and a youth named Marcus Curtius sacrificed himself by leaping in, fully armed and mounted on horseback, in order to fulfill a prophecy claiming that the chasm could be closed only by sacrificing that upon which Rome's future greatness would rest. The third legend states that the spot had been struck by lightning, and that on the Senate's orders, it was enclosed by the consul Gaius Curtius Philo. The story of Mettius Curtius may shed some light on the origin of the Curtia gens; it implies that the Curtii were of Sabine origin.

The consulship of Gaius Curtius Philo in 445 BC is one indication that the gens Curtia must have been patrician, since the consulship at that time was not open to plebeians. The family's appearance in the legends of the earliest period of Roman history also supports this identification, since the family was not particularly illustrious in later times, making it unlikely that these stories were a later development, intended to flatter a powerful noble house. However, there were certainly plebeian Curtii; Gaius Curtius Peducaeanus was tribune of the plebs in 57 BC, indicating that a plebeian branch developed at some point.

== Praenomina ==
The Curtii are known to have used the praenomina Mettius, Gaius, Marcus, Gnaeus, Quintus, and Publius, all of which except Mettius were common throughout Roman history.

== Branches and cognomina ==
The cognomina which occur in this gens under the Republic are Peducaeanus, Philo, and Postumus.

== Members ==
=== Republic ===
- Mettius Curtius, the Sabine champion in the time of Romulus, who slew the Roman champion, Hostus Hostilius. After his victory, he was pursued by the Romans into a swamp, afterwards called the Lacus Curtius, from which he was only able to extricate himself with great difficulty. The location of this swamp later formed part of the Roman Forum.
- Gaius Curtius Philo, consul in 445 BC.
- Marcus Curtius, a noble youth, who in 362 BC is said to have leapt with his horse into a chasm that had appeared in the Forum, and which could not be filled, according to the haruspices, until that upon which Rome's greatness was to be based was thrown in. Upon receiving this living sacrifice, the earth closed up once more. This tradition appears to be an echo of the story of Mettius Curtius, as the abyss is also described as the Lacus Curtius.
- Curtius, an accuser, who was killed by Gaius Marius near the lake of Servilius, at the time of the proscription of Sulla, or perhaps even before.
- Gaius Curtius, perhaps the son of the accuser, lost his property during the proscription of Sulla, and went into exile. He was subsequently allowed to return, through the mediation of Cicero, his childhood friend. He was made a senator by Caesar in 45 BC, and Cicero interceded with Caesar's legate to prevent the redistribution of Curtius' land to the veterans.
- Gnaeus Curtius Postumus, an argentarius, with whom Verres had pecuniary dealings.
- Quintus Curtius Postumus, brother of Gnaeus, an argentarius and friend of Verres, is called by Cicero a judex quaestionis, concerning which nothing further is known.
- Quintus Curtius, a good and well-educated young man, who in 54 BC brought the charge of ambitus against Gaius Memmius, then a candidate for the consulship.
- Marcus (or Gaius) Curtius Peducaeanus, praetor in 50 BC, was the son of Sextus Peducaeus, to whom Cicero had been quaestor, and was adopted by a Curtius. (Note: Cicero's letters refer to him as both Marcus and Gaius. Broughton prefers Marcus, identifying him with Marcus Curtius, quaestor in 61 BC.)
- Marcus Curtius Postumus, recommended by Cicero to Caesar in 54 BC for the post of military tribune, which he obtained. Espoused the cause of Caesar during the Civil War, causing an estrangement with Cicero.
- Quintus Curtius, possibly the same man who accused Memmius, appears on several unusual coins, together with the names of Marcus Silanus and Gnaeus Domitius. Eckhel conjectures that they were triumvirs for the establishment of a colony, and that their coins were struck at some distance from Rome.
- Publius Curtius, a brother of Quintus Salassus, in 45 BC plotted to deliver Gnaeus, the son of Pompey, into the hands of Caesar, with the help of Spanish locals, but was discovered and beheaded at Gnaeus' orders, in front of the whole army.

=== Curtii of the Empire ===
- Curtius, an eques, who once, while dining with Augustus, availed himself of a joke and threw a fish, which was standing on the table, out of the window.
- Curtius Lupus, quaestor in AD 24, suppressed a slave insurrection in the neighborhood of Brundisium, with the help of the crews of three vessels that happened to arrive at the port.
- Curtius Atticus, accompanied the emperor Tiberius on a trip to Campania in AD 26 and was eventually destroyed by Sejanus and Julius Marinus. Two of Ovid's poems are addressed to him.
- Curtius Montanus, accused of libelling Nero in AD 67; the charge was disproved, but Curtius was briefly sent into exile. In 71, he urged the Senate to rescind the decree against Piso, and attacked the informer, Marcus Aquillius Regulus. A friend of the younger Plinius, he may be the same Curtius Montanus satirized by Juvenal.
- Curtius Rufus, consul suffectus under Claudius, received a prophecy from a giantess that he would one day visit Africa as proconsul and die there. All happened as foretold. He is usually identified with the historian, Quintus Curtius Rufus.
- Quintus Curtius Rufus, author of a history of the life and times of Alexander the Great in ten books. There is general agreement that he lived in the first century. A Curtius Rufus mentioned by Tacitus and Plinius is the favored candidate, with a rhetorician named Quintus Curtius Rufus, described by Suetonius, second, if in fact they are not all three the same person.
- Gaius Curtius Justus, consul suffectus in AD 151.
- Aulus Curtius Crispinus, consul suffectus in AD 169.

== See also ==
- List of Roman gentes
