= Urbania gens =

Ancient Roman family

The gens Urbania was an obscure plebeian family at ancient Rome. No members of this gens appear in history, but several are known from inscriptions.

== Origin ==
The nomen Urbanius belongs to a class of gentilicia formed from other nomina or cognomina ending in -anus, typically derived from place names. The surname Urbanus is in turn derived from urbs, "city", and means "from the city".

== Members ==
This list includes abbreviated praenomina. For an explanation of this practice, see filiation.

- Marcus Urbanius Cinnamus, built a first-century sepulchre at Cales in Campania for himself, Satria Seilis, Maria Similis, and the freedman Nymphius.
- Titus Urbanius Matto, along with Titus Valerius Albanus, Lucius Veturius Melo, Gaius Cottius Rufus, and Quintus Sextius, made an offering to Mars, Apollo, and Minerva at Vindonissa in Germania Superior, in AD 79.
- Titus Urbanius Felix, built a first- or second-century tomb at Rome for his wife, Eutychia, aged thirty.
- Urbanius, made an offering to Jupiter Optimus Maximus and Juno Regina at the site of modern Weinheim in Germania Superior, dating between the second century and the middle of the third.
- Gaius Urbanius Firminus, a soldier in the Legio X Gemina, buried at Tucci in Hispania Baetica, built by his colleague, Julius Ingenuus, and dating from the latter half of the second century.
- Gaius Urbanius Marcellus, buried in a second- or third-century tomb at Cyzicus in Asia, built by his son, Gaius Urbanius Caspius.
- Gaius Urbanius C. f. Caspius, built a second- or third-century tomb at Cyzicus for his father, Gaius Urbanius Marcellus.
- Urbania Secunda, along with her husband, Hostilius Fructus, built a third- or fourth-century tomb at Casilinum in Campania for their son, Quintus Urbanius Secundus.
- Quintus Urbanius Secundus, (Note: Despite his name, he was probably a member of the Hostilia gens, as his father was named Hostilius Fructus.) a little boy buried at Casilinum, aged five years, eleven months, and twenty-five days, in a third- or fourth-century tomb built by his parents, Hostilius Fructus and Urbania Secunda.
- Urbania, named in a fourth- or fifth-century inscription from Capena in Etruria.

=== Undated Urbanii ===
- Urbania, buried at Limisa in Africa Proconsularis, aged forty-five.
- Aulus Urbanius, named in a ceramic graffito from the site of modern Haltern am See in Barbaricum.
- Lucius Urbanius, (Note: The gentilicium is partial, but Urbanius is the only recorded nomen beginning with Urba-.) named in an inscription from Colonia in Germania Inferior.
- Urbania Lellua, built a tomb at Colonia for her daughter, Pacatia Florentia.
- Urbania M[...]ia, buried at Tiddis in Numidia.
- Urbania Sabina, buried at Caesena in Cisalpine Gaul, aged twenty-one years, eleven months, eighteen days, and five hours, with a monument from her husband, Fabius Capito.

== See also ==
- List of Roman gentes

== Bibliography ==
- Theodor Mommsen et alii, Corpus Inscriptionum Latinarum (The Body of Latin Inscriptions, abbreviated CIL), Berlin-Brandenburgische Akademie der Wissenschaften (1853–present).
- Charlton T. Lewis and Charles Short, A Latin Dictionary, Clarendon Press, Oxford (1879).
- René Cagnat et alii, L'Année épigraphique (The Year in Epigraphy, abbreviated AE), Presses Universitaires de France (1888–present).
- George Davis Chase, "The Origin of Roman Praenomina", in Harvard Studies in Classical Philology, vol. VIII, pp. 103–184 (1897).
- Brigitte Galsterer, Die Graffiti auf der römischen Gefäßkeramik aus Haltern (The Graffiti of the Roman Clay Pots of Haltern), Münster (1983).
- Laura Chioffi, Museo provinciale Campano di Capua. La raccolta epigrafica (Provincial Museum of Campania at Capua: The Epigraphic Collection), Capua (2005).
