= Saserna =

Saserna may refer to

- Sasernae, two people named Saserna in ancient Rome to whom a book on agriculture is attributed
- Saserna, a branch of Hostilia gens in ancient Rome
- Metallata, a genus of moths
