= Lake-burst =

Phenomenon in Irish mythology

A lake-burst (Old Irish: tomaidm, Irish: tomhaidhm) is a phenomenon referred to in Irish mythology, in which a previously non-existent lake comes into being, often when a grave is being dug. Part of the lake-burst stories may originate in sudden hydrographic changes around limestone-based inland plains or turloughs. Other so-called lake-bursts refer to marine estuaries, bays and inlets, such as Galway Bay, Strangford Lough, Dundrum Bay, Belfast Lough, Waterford Harbour and the mouth of the River Erne. Some of these coastal districts were renowned for the drowned prehistoric forests, which gave rise to several flood-myths.

Lake-bursts play a significant role in Irish water symbolism. The people of Ireland and Celtic Britain generally believed that vast bodies of water — seas or inland lakes — harbored beings from the underworld (Tír fó Thuinn), whether as humans or monstrous creatures, in their depths. Bodies of water not only served as physical boundaries, but also as spiritual thresholds, separating life from death, this world from the otherworld.

Medieval bards had a special genre of lake-burst poems called tomamond. More or less elaborate 11th- or 12th-century narratives have survived around Galway Bay, Lough Neagh and Lough Ree, which seem to be related to similar (though less ancient) stories in Wales (Cantre'r Gwaelod, Llys Helig, Llyn Tegid, Llynclys), Cornwall (Lyonesse), Brittany (Ys) and Normandy (Forêt de Scissy). A late 16th-century Frisian legend, probably borrowed from Irish examples, refers to the origins of the Zuiderzee. Other Irish texts refer to the eruption of the River Boyne and other rivers. The poems of the lake-burst of Lough Erne and the eruption of Brí (where the legendary character Midir lived) have been lost. In Wales the flood myth is elaborated in the story of Dwyfan and Dwyfach, who saved people and animals from the great deluge caused by the monster Avanc living in Llyn Llion (possibly Llyn Tegid). Its Irish counterpart as told in the Lebor Gabála Érenn only links up with the Biblical story of Noah's flood.

The theme relates to the classical story of the warrior Marcus Curtius, who was said to have thrown himself in the Lacus Curtius near the Forum Romanum in order to stop a chasm made by the river Tiber. A similar story was told about King Midas.

== Identification ==
Not every lake mentioned in medieval sources can be identified with certainty. Loch Lainglinne, for instance, might be another reference to Belfast Lough, which was known as Loch Laoigh or Loch Laigh.

Apparently, medieval Irishmen were convinced that almost all of their lakes had emerged after Noah's flood. Their myths suggest that land reclamation and deforestation went hand in hand with the seasonal inundation of low-lying plains. According to the corrupted text of Lebor Gabála Érenn king Partholón found only three lakes or bays: Loch Fordremain in Sliab Mis of Mumhan (Tralee Bay), Loch Lumnig (probably Loch Lurgan or Galway Bay) on Tir Find and Loch Cera or Findloch over the borders of Irrus. Interestingly enough, several major lakes and outlets, such as Lough Corrib, Lough Derg (Shannon), Shannon Estuary and Killary Harbour are not mentioned in any known myth. This may imply that at least some lake-bursts mentioned have been wrongly identified with smaller lakes, where, in fact, they may have been referring to one of the major lakes. The cave of St Patrick's Purgatory on Station Island in Lough Derg (Ulster), moreover, was identified in the Tractatus de Purgatorio Sancti Patricii as the entrance to the Underworld.

The plains that supposedly had been drowned, had special names, which have been preserved in a 16th-century manuscript.

== List of mythical lake-bursts ==
The Book of Invasions (Lebor Gabála Érenn) describes seven waves of invaders who came to Ireland, including the Partholonians, Nemedians, Fir Bolg, Tuatha Dé Danann, and Milesians. Each wave reshaped the land, often accompanied by lake-bursts or floods that symbolized renewal and transformation.

=== Fionn mac Cumhaill's time ===
- Galway Bay or Loch Lurgan.

=== Partholón's time ===
- Loch Laighlinne in Ui mac Uais of Brega (Laighlinne's grave)
- Loch Rudraige, in Ulaid (Rudraige's grave)
- Loch Techet, in Connachta
- Loch Mese, in Connachta
- Loch Con, in Connachta
- Loch Echtra, in Airgialla (between Sliabh Modharn and Sliabh Fuaid), "full of swans"
- Loch Cuan in Ulaid, an inundation of the sea over the land of Brena, or by the river Brena - the seventh lake eruption

=== Nemed's time ===
- Loch Annind (Annind's grave)
- Loch Cal in Ui Niallain
- Loch Munremair in Luigne
- Loch Dairbrech (another king's grave)

=== Érimón's time ===
- Loch Cimbe
- Loch Buadhaigh
- Loch Baadh
- Loch Ren
- Loch Finnhaighe
- Loch Greine
- Loch Riach
- Loch Chaech, in Leinster
- Loch Laegh, in Ulster

=== Tigernmas's time ===
- Loch Uair, in Meath
- Loch n-Iairn
- Loch Ce, in Connaught
- Loch Saileann
- Loch nAilleann, in Connaught
- Loch Feabhail
- Loch Gabhair
- Dubhloch
- Loch Dabhall, in Oirghialla.

=== Óengus Olmucaid's time ===
- Aenbheithe, in Ui Cremhthainn
- Loch Saileach
- Loch Na nGasan, in Magh Luirg, in Connaught
- The eruption of the sea between Eabha and Ros Cette

=== Óengus the Mac Oc's time ===
- Lough Neagh

== See also ==
- Bodb Derg
- Nemed
- Turlough (lake)
- List of loughs in Ireland
- Flood myth
