= Histories of Alexander the Great =

First century biography, by Quintus Curtius Rufus

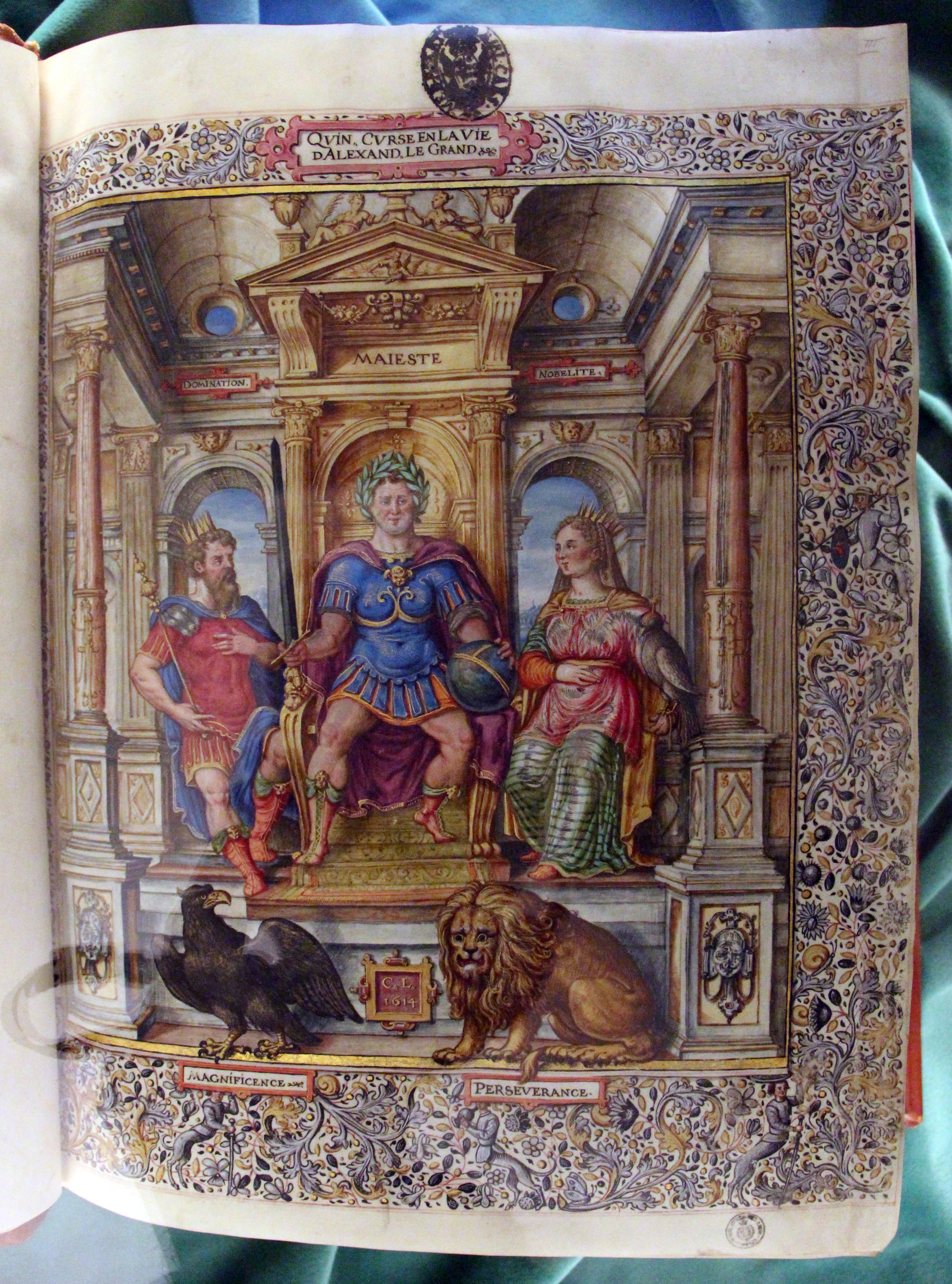
- Qui. Curse En La Vie Alexand. Le Grand, illumination from manuscript located at the Laurentian Library of Florence
- Author: Quintus Curtius Rufus
- Original title: Historiae Alexandri Magni
- Working title: Historiarum Alexandri Magni Macedonis Libri Qui Supersunt
- Subject: Life and times of Alexander the Great
- Genre: Biography, History
- Publication date: early 40s AD

The Histories of Alexander the Great (Latin: Historiae Alexandri Magni) is the only surviving extant Latin biography of Alexander the Great. It was written by the Roman historian Quintus Curtius Rufus in the 1st-century AD, but the earliest surviving manuscript comes from the 9th century.

== Manuscripts and editions ==
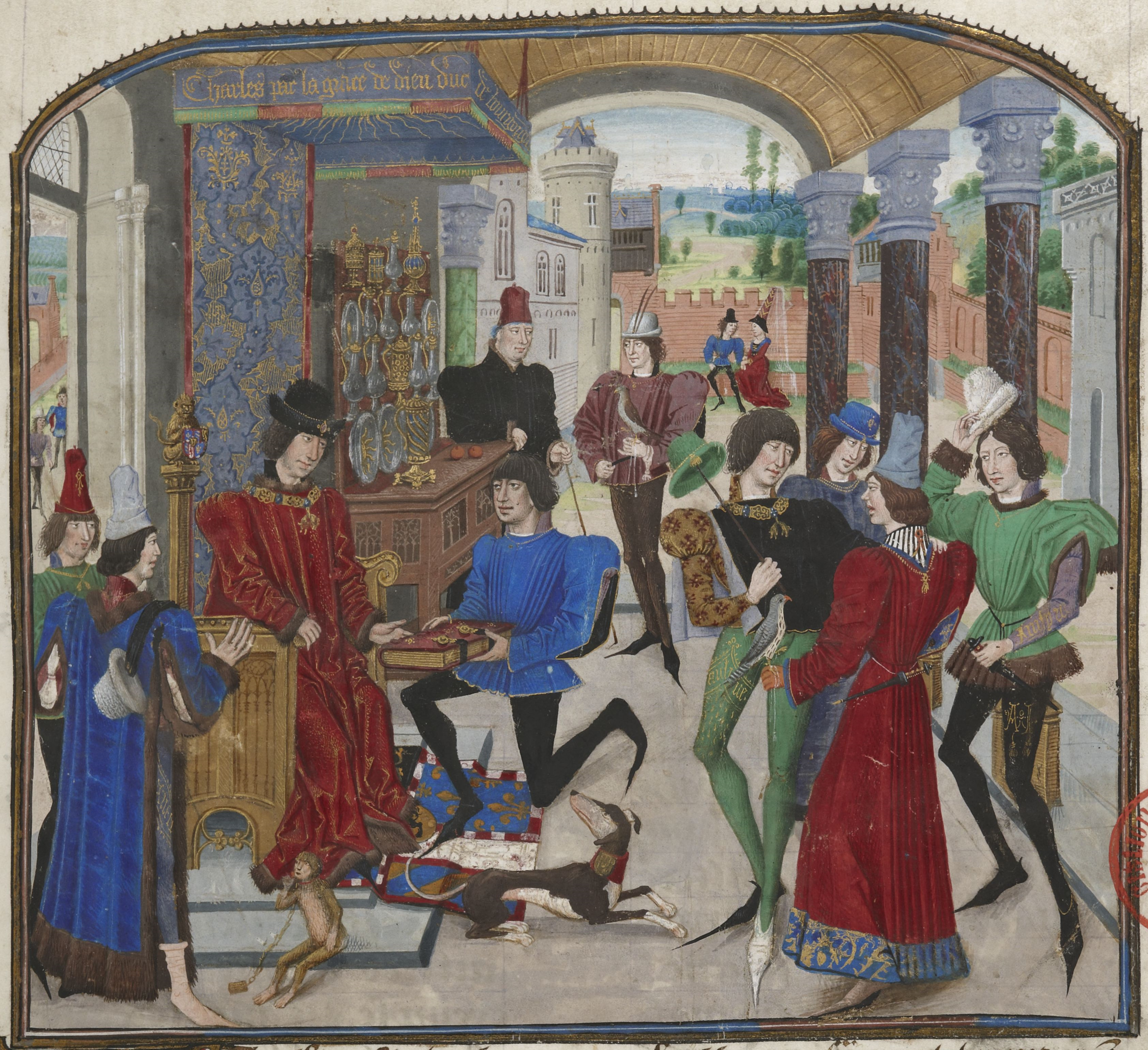
Vasco de Lucena presenting his translation of Rufus' Histories of Alexander the Great to Charles the Bold, c. 1470

The Historiae survives in 123 codices, or bound manuscripts, all deriving from an original in the second half of the 9th century, Paris, BnF lat. 5716, which was copied during the Carolingian Renaissance for a certain Count Conrad by the scribe Haimo in the Loire region. As the Historiae was a partial text, already missing large pieces, the manuscripts are partial as well. Some are more partial than others, with lacunae that developed since the 9th century. The original contained ten libri ("books") equivalent to our chapters. Books I and II are missing, along with any Introduction that might have been expected according to ancient custom. There are gaps in V, VI, and X. Many loci ("places") throughout are obscure, subject to interpretation or emendation in the name of restoration.

The work enjoyed popularity in the High Middle Ages. It is the main source for a genre of tales termed the Alexander Romance (some say romances); for example, Walter of Chatillon's epic poem Alexandreis, which was written in the style of Virgil's Aeneid. These romances spilled over into the Renaissance, especially of Italy, where Curtius was idolized. Painters such as Paolo Veronese and Charles Le Brun painted scenes from Curtius.

The editio princeps, or first printed edition, was published in 1470 or 1471 at Venice by Vindelinus Spirensis. A slow but steady stream of editions appeared subsequently until more of a need for standardization was perceived. In 1867 Edmund Hedicke instigated a convention that persists yet. He based his edition of that year on the five best manuscripts.

== The vulgate authors ==
In what remains of his work, Curtius mainly does not identify sources. They were, perhaps, stated in the missing books. Speculations of what they were based on thorough analysis of the content and style vary widely. Yardley and Heckel say: "The internal evidence for Curtius' sources is disappointing." He does, however, mention Cleitarchus, a historian in camp, twice, Ptolemy once, and Timagenes once. These men were participants in the Alexander story and therefore are counted as eyewitnesses, or primary sources. All accounts based on them are by analogy also termed "primary." These works are also called "the Vulgate."

== Alexander’s historical archives ==
Alexander's headquarters included a historical archives unit. Of lowest rank were clerks whose task it was to collect information about the day's operations and events, probably in the form of written notes. This information was reported to an officer in charge of keeping the ephemerides, “Day Journal,” a record of the army's doings similar to a ship's log. For most of Alexander's expedition, the officer was Diodotus of Erythrae, who remained of such low rank that he is only mentioned once anywhere. His commanding officer, Eumenes, was a Hetairos, a trusted companion of Alexander. Once the Day Journal was completed for the day, it was made available to the army's official historian, Callisthenes, a grand-nephew of Aristotle. He and Alexander were both peripatetics.

Callisthenes was not the only officer to take an interest in the Day Journal. Cleitarchus was writing a history, and so was Ptolemy. The two were together in Alexandria, Egypt, after the Partition of Babylon. The next generation of historians, such as Timagenes and Arrian, were to make extensive use of the Day Journal, as well as of the histories of Callisthenes and Ptolemy. Callisthenes came to a bad end through his resistance to adopting Persian customs promulgated by Alexander as part of his programme for building a multi-ethnic state. Some of the journal was lost by him on the Indus River. Eumenes switched to being an infantry officer after the death of Alexander. In the Partition, he went with Perdiccas, to share his evil fate. The Day Journal was continued, presumably under Diodotus and the clerks. Strattis of Olynthus subsequently wrote a work about it.

Despite Alexander's care, the Day Journal is missing without a trace except for the works of the writers who used it. For the most part they went with Ptolemy, the ultimate victor in the Wars of the Diadochi. He did the most also to perpetuate the traditions of the Lyceum, Aristotle's school, building a library and a research center grander than any that had gone before, and personally inviting any peripatetics that he encountered during his maritime hegemony. He went out of his way and spared no expense to obtain the best engineers, mathematicians and philosophers. It is only because of his proactive efforts and those of his librarians that so many ancient writings have survived. Later, Curtius could have found his primary sources nowhere else. The library was subsequently lost, but it had done its work in disseminating Greek scholarship throughout the Graeco-Roman world.

== Author and dating ==
Curtius Rufus served as Consul Suffectus in AD 43 under the emperor Claudius. He must have written the Histories in the year or two before his consulship. Tacitus says that he was on the staff of the Quaestor of Africa during that time, which would have given him the opportunity to use the Library of Alexandria. Caligula was emperor then. Curtius’ relations with Caligula are not mentioned, but Caligula was not in his vicinity.

On Curtius’ return, a book such as the Historiae unless politically incorrect would have impressed the scholarly Claudius. Tiberius already had been an admirer before the book: he said that Curtius Rufus was his own ancestor; i.e., a self-made man. Tacitus hints that Curtius was of low birth, possibly the son of a gladiator. The story is only compatible with the name if one assumes adoption, which Tiberius could easily have arranged.

== See also ==
- The Anabasis of Alexander
