= Hostus (praenomen) =

Latin name

Hostus /ˈhɒstəs/ is a Latin praenomen, or personal name, which was used in pre-Roman times and during the early centuries of the Roman Republic, but become obsolete by the 1st century BC. The feminine form was probably Hosta or Hostia. The patronymic gentes Hostia and Hostilia were derived from Hostus. The name was not regularly abbreviated.

Hostus is best known from Hostus Hostilius, a companion of Romulus, the founder and first king of Rome. Hostus was a Roman champion who fell in battle against the Sabines under Titus Tatius in the earliest years of the city. His grandson was Tullus Hostilius, the third king of Rome. Although rare, the name was still evidently in use more than three centuries later, when Hostus Lucretius Tricipitinus was consul late in the 5th century BC. As with other praenomina, the name may have been more widely used by the plebeians and in the countryside; but writing in the 1st century BC, Marcus Terentius Varro described it as an archaic praenomen, no longer in general use.

== Origin and Meaning of the Name ==
The etymology of Hostus has long baffled scholars. Chase proposed that Hostus might be derived from hostis, "stranger, foe", but this meaning seems difficult to explain. An alternative explanation is suggested by the Etruscan feminine praenomen Hasti, which may originally have been a variant of Fasti, in which the initial consonant has been "worn down". Fasti is believed to be the Etruscan cognate of the Latin name Fausta, in which case it is conceivable that the same process resulted in the development of Hostus from the praenomen Faustus.
