= Quintus Curtius Rufus =

1st-century Roman historian

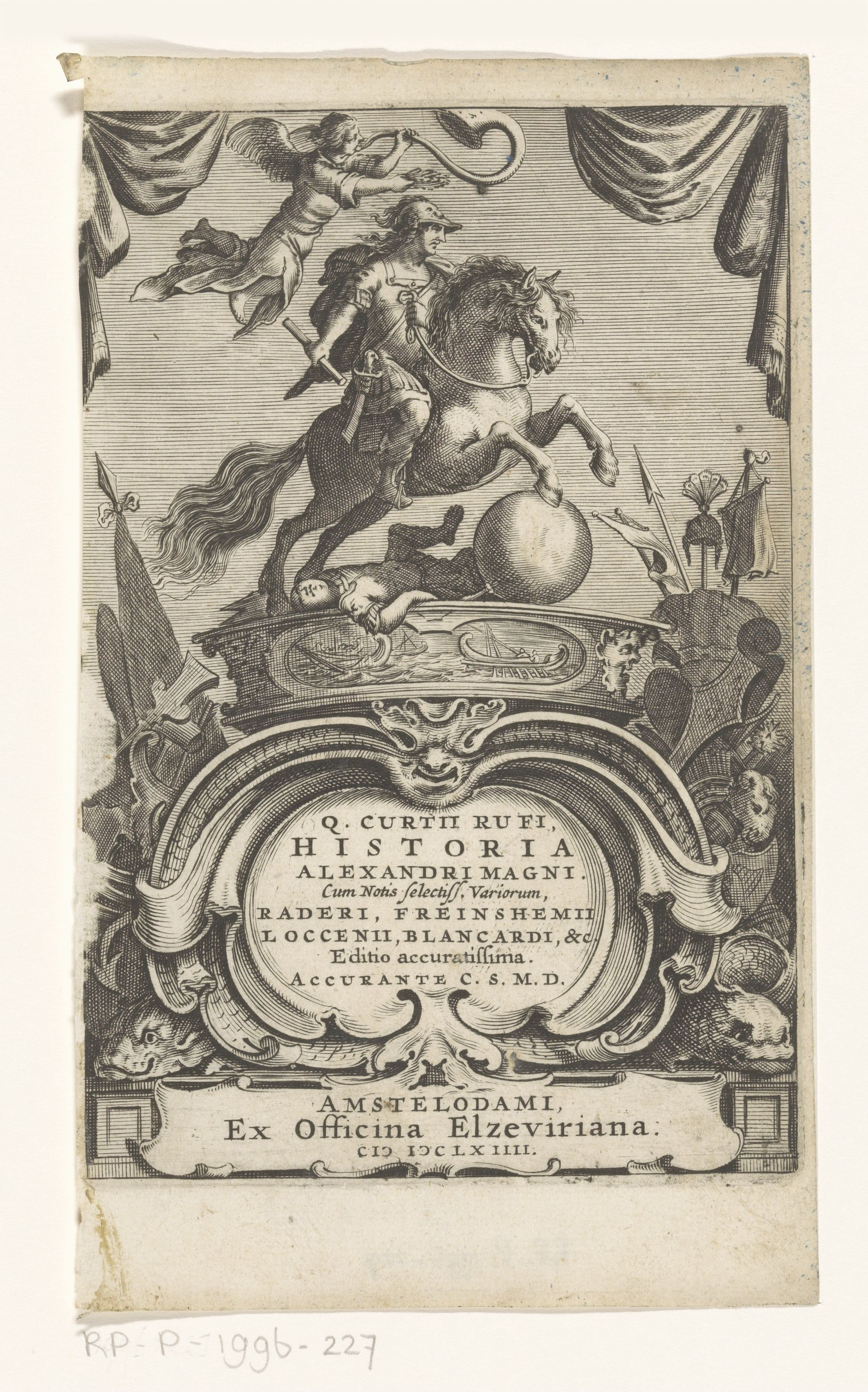
- Quintus Curtius Rufus. Historia Alexandri Magni. Leiden: Elzevier, 1664.
- Occupation: Historian
- Language: Latin
- Citizenship: Roman Empire
- Genres: Biography, history
- Subject: Life and times of Alexander the Great
- Literary movement: Silver age of Latin literature
- Years active: first century AD
- Notable works: Histories of Alexander the Great

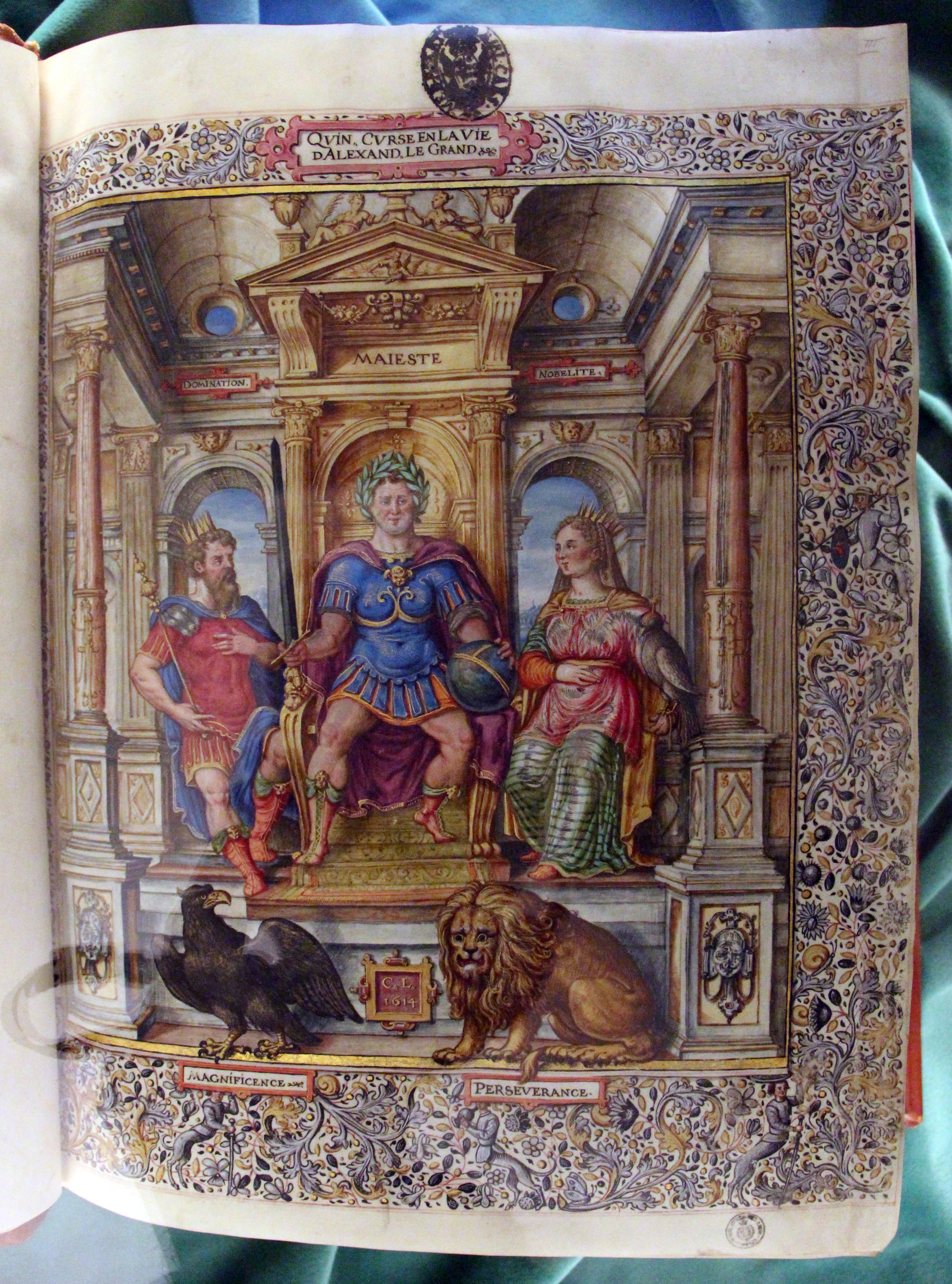
Qui. Curse En La Vie Alexand. Le Grand, illumination from manuscript located at the Laurentian Library of Florence.

Quintus Curtius Rufus (/ˈkwɪntəs ˈkɜːrʃiəs ˈruːfəs/) was a Roman historian, likely active in the 1st century AD. He is known solely for his surviving work, Historiae Alexandri Magni ("Histories of Alexander the Great"), more fully titled Historiarum Alexandri Magni Macedonis Libri Qui Supersunt ("The Surviving Books of the Histories of Alexander the Great of Macedon"). Significant portions of the original work are missing.

Aside from his name on the manuscripts, no biographical details about Curtius Rufus are definitively known. This lack of information has led some philologists to speculate that he may have had another, unidentified historical identity. Several theories have been proposed, though they are regarded with varying degrees of credibility. Nevertheless, the identity of Quintus Curtius Rufus as the author of the Histories is generally treated as distinct.

== Historical identity ==
Quintus Curtius Rufus remains an enigmatic figure. His Histories of Alexander the Great is uniquely isolated in Roman literature, as no other ancient text is known to reference either the work or the author. Peter Pratt (Note: (Pratt 1809, pp. xvi–xxi): The lesser-known Pratt was a clerk in the library of East India House. His employment was to research and publish documents on the East Indies trade. He expanded that process into writing universal history books, such as the History of Japan. He did some writing to gratify his own interests, such as the translation of Curtius, which reveals the depth of his education and research. He remained so unself-confident that he did not put his name on the work. In the Preface, he begins one footnote with "As a stranger to antiquarian studies, I hesitate to point out ...." He was certainly no stranger. The book received professional reviews, becoming popular.) has suggested that Curtius may have died before publishing the manuscript, possibly leaving it in the care of the emperor. According to this theory, the manuscript was withheld from publication due to political sensitivities. Roman emperors had increasingly adopted the image of Alexander the Great for their own ideological purposes, and Curtius' account—detailing themes of conquest, rebellion, and imperial ambition—may have been deemed politically inappropriate in the context of restive provinces that once formed part of Alexander's empire.

Pratt conjectures that the earliest suitable moment for publication arose in 167 AD, during the reign of Marcus Aurelius. At that time, Rome had suffered military setbacks in the Parthian campaign, troop morale was low, and the Antonine Plague had spread. In an effort to boost morale and unity, especially among the eastern provinces, the emperor promoted Hellenistic imagery. Avidius Cassius, commander of Legio III Gallica and reputed descendant of the Seleucids, was elevated to consul. Alexandrian themes appeared on new coinage in Macedonia. Pratt speculates that Curtius' manuscript, damaged and incomplete after years of storage, may have been released at this time, accounting for the lack of earlier references. It is also possible that Books I and II, along with other sections, were suppressed. As anticipated, the work gained immediate popularity.

=== Most probable date ===
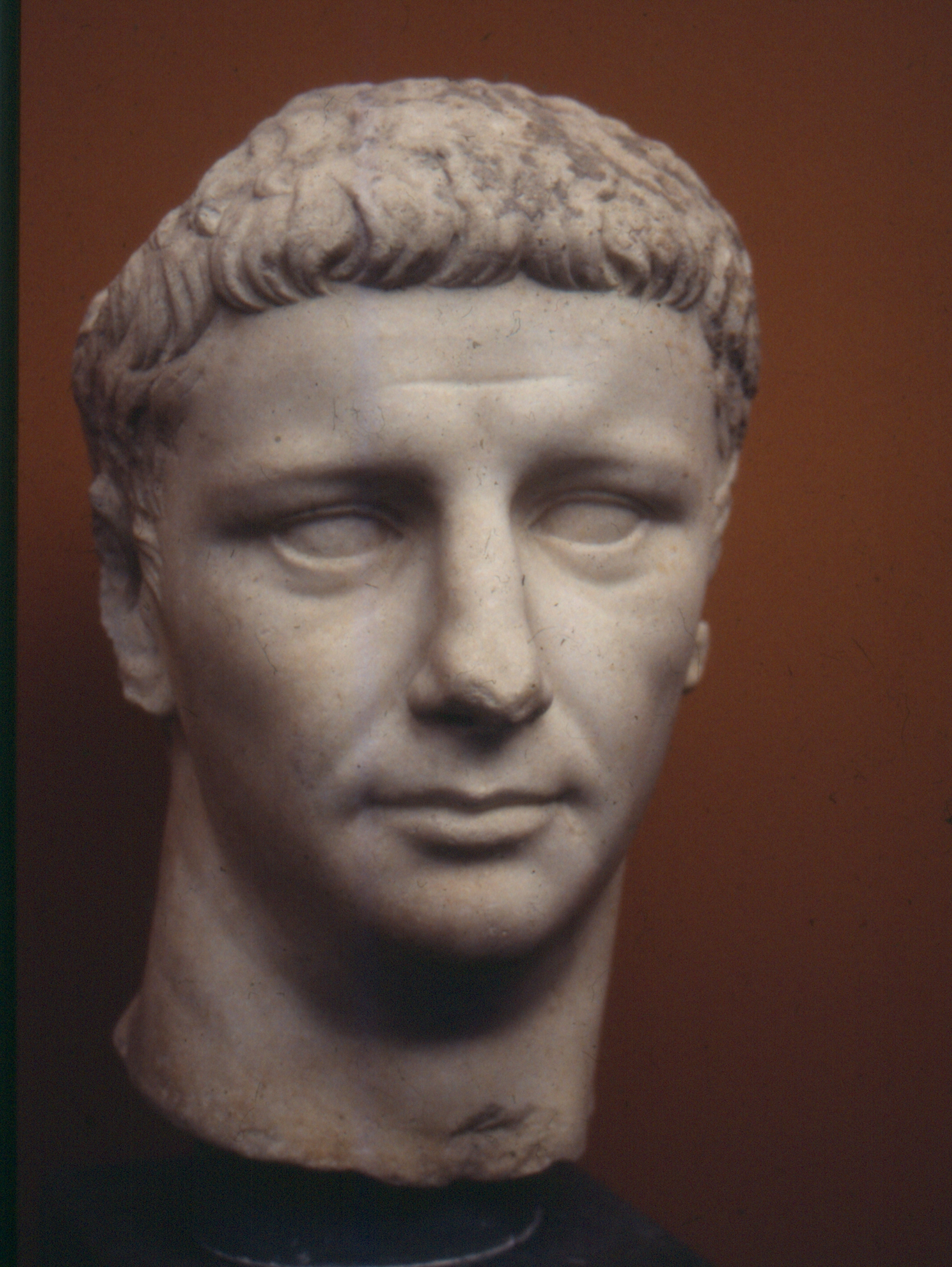
Claudius

The dating of Curtius' Histories relies entirely on internal evidence, which, while uncertain, suggests a likely period. In Book X, Curtius includes an encomium on the blessings of peace under Roman imperial rule, referencing the contemporary empire. He endorses the Augustan policy of empire as a means of ending civil war and restoring stability, implicitly aligning himself with the imperial period.

He also mentions the Parthian Empire, which emerged after eastern satrapies rejected Hellenistic rule to re-establish an Iranian polity. The Parthians successfully resisted Roman expansion, though Rome absorbed most of the former Macedonian kingdoms. The Parthian Empire existed from 247 BC to 224 AD, suggesting that Curtius was writing within this span. A conservative estimate places his activity between 63 BC (conventionally the beginning of the Roman Empire) and 224 AD.

Further specificity comes from a purple passage that contrasts the succession crises of the Macedonian Diadochi with a Roman episode in which a civil war was averted by the immediate appointment of a new emperor. Few events fit this description precisely. Julius Nützell, summarised by Baynham, argues that the event in question is likely the night of 24/25 January 41 AD, following the assassination of Caligula. In response, the Senate debated restoring the Republic, but the Praetorian Guard intervened and declared Claudius emperor. His subsequent reign focused on legal reform and re-establishment of imperial order. If this interpretation is correct, the Histories must date to sometime after 41 AD.

An upper bound is suggested by a reference to the "continued prosperity of Tyre under Roman dominion." The relative peace of the early empire began to unravel with the invasion of Britain in 43 AD under Claudius. While none of these indicators is definitive, taken together they support a plausible date for Curtius in the mid-to-late first century AD. Baynham concludes that "many modern scholars now accept a date in the middle to late part of the first century AD as a likely floruit for Curtius."

=== Most probable identity ===
Based on his name, Quintus Curtius Rufus would have belonged to the Curtii Rufi, a branch of the patrician Curtii family, one of Rome's oldest noble houses. However, due to the widespread practice of adoption and the common repetition of names within Roman families, not all bearers of the name were necessarily related by blood.

Despite the name's prevalence, only a few individuals are plausible candidates for identification with the historian. Given the likely mid-1st century dating, one credible possibility is a Curtius Rufus (his praenomen is not preserved, but may have been Quintus) who served as consul suffectus from October to December 43 AD under Emperor Claudius. He had previously been a protégé of Tiberius.

According to Tacitus, this Curtius Rufus had served on the staff of a quaestor in Africa, which would have afforded him access to scholarly resources, including the Library of Alexandria. Tiberius, who died in 37 AD, is said to have considered Curtius a self-made man and claimed him as a spiritual ancestor. Tacitus implies that Curtius may have been of low birth, perhaps the son of a gladiator. This narrative would be plausible only if adoption had elevated his status, a mechanism readily available to the imperial family.

Assuming he attained the consulship at the minimum age of 25, and Tiberius made his remark in his final year, Curtius would have been 19 or younger at the time—remarkable, but not unprecedented in an era when Alexander had become regent of Macedon at 16. Tiberius would have been in the later stages of his reign when Curtius came to prominence. Though the precise reasons for his imperial patronage are unclear, if the historian and the suffect consul are the same individual, the available evidence suggests he was likely born in the early years of the 1st century AD, during the reign of Augustus.

== The Historiae ==
=== Manuscripts and editions ===
Historiae survives in 123 codices (bound manuscripts), all of which are derived from a common exemplar dating to the 9th century. As this original was already incomplete—missing substantial portions—the extant manuscripts are likewise fragmentary. Their condition varies, with some exhibiting additional lacunae that developed after the 9th century. The original work comprised ten libri ("books", roughly equivalent to modern chapters). Books I and II, as well as any introductory material customary in ancient works, are entirely missing. Further gaps exist in Books V, VI, and X. Numerous loci ("passages") throughout the text are obscure and have required interpretation or emendation in attempts at textual restoration.

The work gained popularity during the High Middle Ages and served as a principal source for the Alexander Romance a literary genre recounting fantastical versions of Alexander the Great's life. One notable example is Alexandreis, an epic poem by Walter of Châtillon composed in the style of Virgil's Aeneid. The romanticised narratives continued into the Italian Renaissance, where Curtius' work was widely admired. Painters such as Paolo Veronese and Charles Le Brun created artworks inspired by episodes from Curtius' text.

The Editio Princeps (first printed edition) was produced in Venice by Vindelinus Spirensis in 1470 or 1471. A steady succession of editions followed, culminating in a greater demand for textual standardisation. In 1867, Edmund Hedicke introduced a convention that remains influential. His edition was based on what he considered the five best surviving manuscripts.

=== Sources and the "Vulgate" tradition ===
In the extant portions of Historiae, Curtius rarely identifies his sources directly. It is possible that source references appeared in the missing books. Scholarly attempts to determine his sources through analysis of style and content have produced varied and inconclusive results. Yardley and Heckel note: "The internal evidence for Curtius' sources is disappointing."

Nevertheless, Curtius explicitly mentions Cleitarchus twice, Ptolemy once, and Timagenes once. These individuals were either contemporaries of Alexander or had access to firsthand accounts, and are therefore considered primary sources. Consequently, works derived from their narratives are often grouped under the term "Vulgate". This label is used for a tradition of Alexander historiography based on popular or widely circulated accounts rather than strictly scholarly or official ones.

== See also ==
- Curtius Rufus

== Sources ==
- Baynham, Elizabeth (1998). Alexander the Great: The Unique History of Quintus Curtius. Ann Arbor: University of Michigan Press.
- Curtius, Rufus Quintus (1896). Humphreys, Willard (ed.). Selections from the History of Alexander the Great. Boston: Ginn & Co.
- Hamilton, J.R. (1988). "The Date of Quintus Curtius Rufus". Zeitschrift für alte Geschichte. Bd. 37: 445–456.
- Heckel, Waldemar, ed. (2004) [First published 1984]. Quintus Curtius Rufus: The History of Alexander. Penguin Classics. Translated by Yardley, J.C. London: Penguin Books. ISBN 978-014044412-4.
- Lucarini, Carlo M. (2009). Q. Curtius Rufus: Historiae. Bibliotheca scriptorum Graecorum et Romanorum Teubneriana (in Latin). Berolini [Berlin]; Novi Eboraci [New York]: Walter De Gruyter.
- Pratt, P. (1809). The History of the Life and Reign of Alexander the Great. Vol. I. London: Samuel Bagster.
- Rolfe, John C. (1971) [First published 1946]. Quintus Curtius, with an English Translation. Vol. I, Books I-V. Cambridge; London: Harvard University Press; William Heinemann.
- Yardley, J.C. (2009). Curtius Rufus, Histories of Alexander the Great, Book 10. Clarendon Ancient History Series. Introduction and historical commentary by J. E. Atkinson. Oxford; New York: Oxford University Press. ISBN 978-019955763-9.
