= Temple of Jupiter Stator (3rd century BC) =

Ancient Roman temple at the Palatine hill

- Shown in ancient Rome
- Interactive map of Temple of Jupiter Stator
- 41°53′31″N 12°29′15″E

The Temple of Jupiter Stator ("Jupiter the Sustainer") was a sanctuary at the foot of the Palatine Hill in Rome. In Roman legend, it was founded by the first king of Rome, Romulus, honoring a pledge he had made during a battle between the Romans and the Sabines. However, no temple seems to have been built on the site until the early 3rd century BC.

== Legend ==
The Battle of the Lacus Curtius took place in the Forum area between the Romans and Sabines. The Romans under Romulus had been forced to retreat uphill on the Via Sacra. According to Livy 1.12.6, in the vicinity of the Porta Mugonia Romulus prayed to Jupiter, vowing to build a temple on that site if the god stemmed the Sabine advance. The Romans regrouped and held their ground, staving off defeat.

In Livy 10.36.11 the same story is told about the consul Marcus Atilius Regulus, who made a similar vow in a similar situation, when the Romans were losing a battle against the Samnites in 294 BC, but they miraculously turned around, regrouped and held their ground against the enemy. Some scholars believe that the story of the earlier foundation by Romulus was a later pseudo-tradition. Livy himself (10.37.15) explains that the earlier temple was merely a fānum, that is, consecrated ground where a temple was to be built later.

On November 8, 63 BC, it was in this temple, close to the Palatine Hill, that the senate convened to hear the consul Marcus Tullius Cicero deliver the first of his famous Catiline Orations against his enemy Lucius Catilina. This temple was also the place where Cicero imagined himself, 19 years later, delivering his Second Philippic oration against Mark Antony, although that speech was never actually given.

The temple was destroyed in the Great Fire of Rome during Nero's reign in July of 64 CE.

== Location ==
Written sources locate the temple just in front of the gate of the Palatine Hill leading to the Sacred Way. For example, Ovid (Fasti 6.794) mentions the temple of Stator "which Romulus once founded in front of the mouth of the Palatine Hill" (quam Romulus olim ante Palatini condidit ora iugi). However, the exact location of this gate, the Porta Mugonia, is not known with absolute certainty.

Livy states that the temple was located near the royal palace at the time of the death of Lucius Tarquinius Priscus, near the "new street" (nova via) and that Queen Tanaquil addressed the people from the palace window.

There is a fair amount of consensus on a location just besides the Arch of Titus on the northern slope of the Palatine Hill. When a medieval tower was demolished in 1827, the ruins of an ancient building appeared, and the remains are frequently identified as the foundations of the temple.

The Italian archaeologist Filippo Coarelli places it closer to the forum, between the Temple of Antoninus and Faustina and the Basilica of Maxentius, where the Temple of Romulus stands. His line of reasoning is based on the course of the Via Sacra before the construction of the Basilica of Maxentius, the known borders of the ancient administrative regions of the city and the literary sources listing the monuments in each region. The location near the Arch of Titus does not fit since it is in the wrong administrative region and not in the right position relative to the other buildings listed by ancient writers, but the Temple of Romulus on the Via Sacra is a perfect match.

== The name Stator ==
The Latin word Stator (the a is short, cf. Ovid Fasti 6.794, Tristia 3.1.31) has two possible meanings, one "stander, attendant" from the intransitive verb stō "I stand", the other "he who makes someone stand", from the transitive verb sistō "I cause to stand". The second meaning is the one intended here. The Oxford Latin Dictionary translates it as "one who establishes or upholds", Lewis and Short's Latin Dictionary as "stayer, supporter".

Livy similarly connects the name Stator with the verb sistō in Romulus's prayer to Jupiter made at the moment when Romulus vowed to build a temple: "Take away the Romans' terror, and stay their disgraceful fleeing (dēme terrōrem Rōmānīs fugamque foedam siste); here I vow a temple to you, the Stayer Jupiter, to be a reminder to posterity that the city was saved with your present help." In his account of the year 294 BC, he connects it with cōnsistō "I stand firm": templum Iovī Statōrī vovet, sī cōnstitisset ā fugā Rōmāna aciēs "(Regulus) vowed a temple to Jupiter the Stayer, if the Roman battle line stood firm".

== See also ==
- List of Ancient Roman temples
