= Curtius Leaping into the Gulf =

Painting by Benjamin Robert Haydon

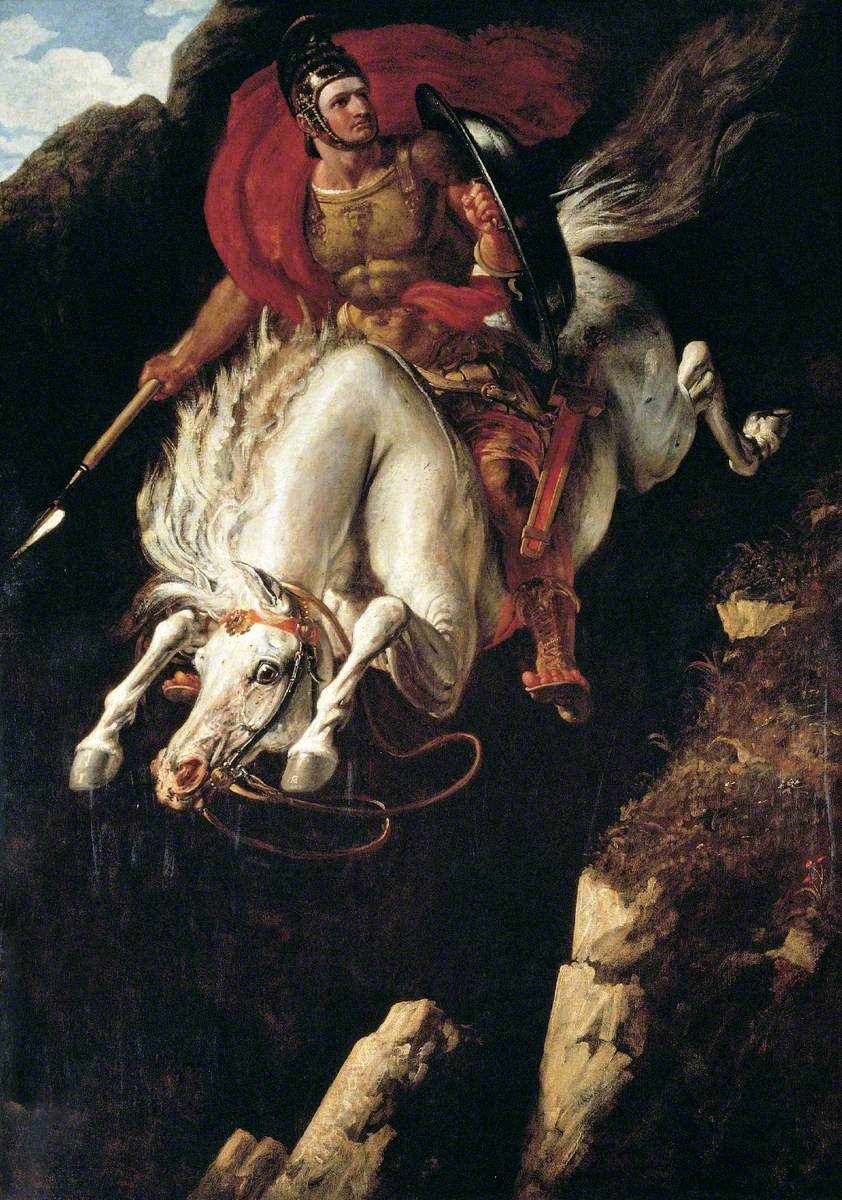
- Artist: Benjamin Robert Haydon
- Year: 1842
- Type: Oil on canvas, history painting
- Dimensions: 304.8 cm × 213.3 cm (120.0 in × 84.0 in)
- Location: Royal Albert Memorial Museum; Exeter

Curtius Leaping into the Gulf is an 1842 history painting by the British artist Benjamin Robert Haydon. It depicts a scene from the early Roman Republic recorded by Livy. Marcus Curtius bravely leaps into a giant hole that had opened up in the Roman Forum in an act of self-sacrifice in order to save the city. The face of Curtius is a self-portrait of Haydon, while he used the Elgin Marbles as an inspiration for the horse. It was displayed at the 1843 Royal Institution exhibition in London. It was generally praised and was described by the Morning Chronicle as "the finest work of art in the exhibition". The painting is in the collection of the Royal Albert Memorial Museum in Exeter, having been acquired in 1933.

== Bibliography ==
- Carlisle, Janice. Picturing Reform in Victorian Britain. Cambridge University Press, 2012.
- Connell, Philip & Leask, Nigel (ed.) Romanticism and Popular Culture in Britain and Ireland. Cambridge University Press, 2009.
- O'Keeffe, Paul. A Genius for Failure: The life of Benjamin Robert Haydon. Random House, 2011.
- Wright, Christopher, Gordon, Catherine May & Smith, Mary Peskett. British and Irish Paintings in Public Collections: An Index of British and Irish Oil Paintings by Artists Born Before 1870 in Public and Institutional Collections in the United Kingdom and Ireland. Yale University Press, 2006.
