= Sasernae =

Sasernae is the name for two people, both named Saserna, apparently both authors, who lived in ancient Rome after the time of Cato the Elder. Described as a father and son, the book on agriculture attributed to them may have been a collaboration. Little is known about them, as the book is no longer extant. The name Saserna was a cognomen of the Hostilia gens. It is also possible that they were Etruscan.
