= Hostius =

Roman poet

Hostius an ancient Roman poet. He is most famous for writing the lost poem Bellum Histricum, which was at least two books long. It is uncertain which Istrian war was the subject of this poem, but scholars generally consider the second war (129 BC) is more likely, as the first (178–7) had already been treated by Ennius in his Annales. Only seven fragments of Hostius' poem survive, but it was probably in the panegyric style which was common in the Hellenistic period.

Based on a reference to a doctus avus ("learned ancestor") in a poem by Propertius, many scholars believe that his lover Cynthia – whose real name was apparently Hostia – was descended from Hostius. Edward Courtney doubts this, arguing that the girl addressed in the poem is not Cynthia.
