= Lacus Curtius =

Pit or pool in the ground in the Forum Romanum

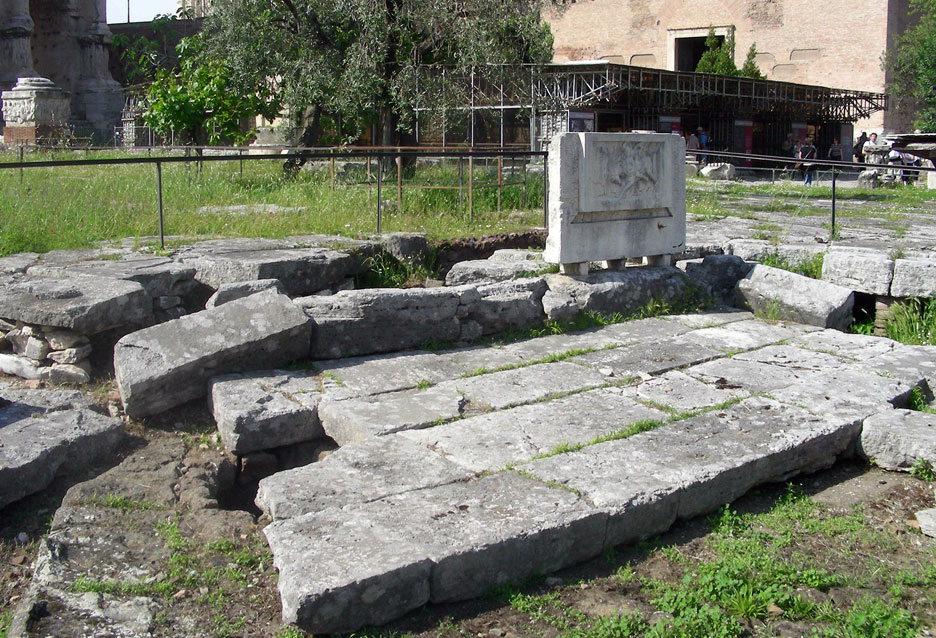
- The Lacus Curtius today

- Location within Rome
- 41.8923973°N 12.4850177°E
- Location: Regio VIII Forum Romanum

History
- Built: Archaic through Imperial periods
- Built by: Unknown builder

The Lacus Curtius ("Lake Curtius") was a pit or pool in the ground of the Forum Romanum. The area where the Forum would be built was likely once a lake, as the wider area is known to have been surrounded by brooks and marshes. One part was never drained and gradually shrank until only a basin, known as the Lacus Curtius, was left. Its nature and significance in Rome’s early history is uncertain, and several conflicting stories exist about its origin and purpose.

The name of the place is likely connected with the Curtia gens, a very old Roman Family with Sabine origins.

== History ==
The exact history of the feature was not well known even to the Romans themselves, and at least three different explanations were given for its name. Two were given by Livy, and another by Varro. By order of when they are said to have taken place:

=== Livy's Sabine war origin ===
According to the oldest story (8th century BCE), the Lacus Curtius was named after a champion of the Sabines, the horseman Mettius Curtius. In the war that followed the Rape of the Sabine Women, he was said to have gotten stuck in the marsh during battle. This is corroborated by the fact that the Forum was once marshland, the fact that the Curtia Gens was of Sabine origin, and that the name Mettius was an authentic Sabine one taken from the word medìss "leader".

=== Varro's lightning origin ===
A second version (~445 BCE), and also the most prosaic, says Gaius Curtius Philon, a consul, had consecrated the site after a lightning strike had hit it.

=== Livy's mythical origin ===
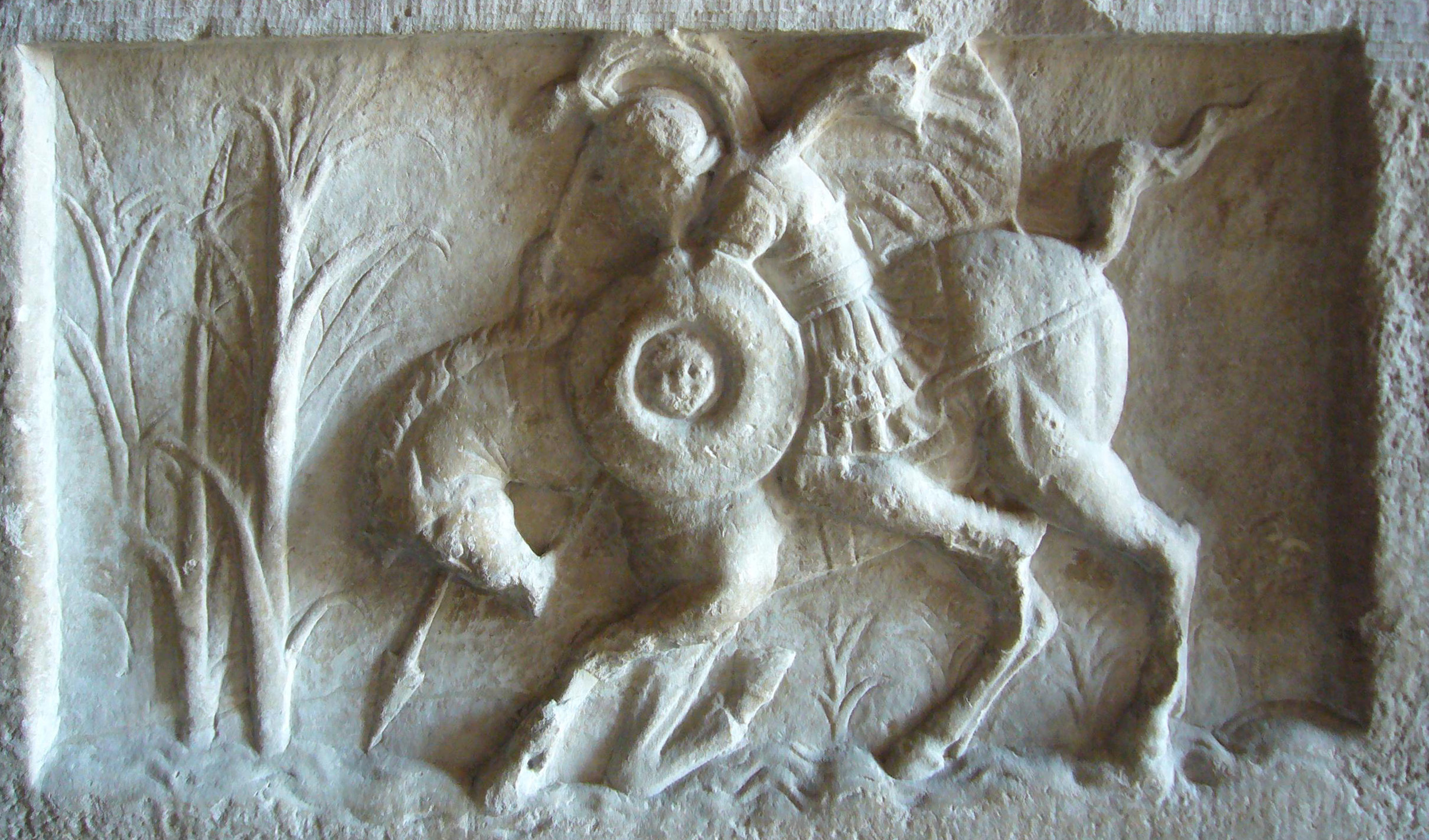
Marcus Curtius (Roman relief unearthed in 1553, Tabularium)

The Lacus Curtius may have been regarded with some veneration by ancient Romans. The most popular story (~362 BCE), and also the one Livy deemed most likely, was a myth glorifying the nation: Rome was endangered when a great chasm opened on the Forum. An oracle directed the people to throw into the chasm “that what constituted the greatest strength of the Roman people,” and doing so would make the Roman nation last forever. After various things had been dropped into the ravine without result, a young horseman named Marcus Curtius (again, of the Curtia gens) saved the city by realizing that it was virtus that the Romans held most dear. In full armour on his horse, he jumped into the chasm whereupon the earth closed over him and Rome was saved. The story, though clearly epic in nature, was likely a copy of another very similar Greek story concerning king Midas.

=== Other possibilities ===
A bit to the east of the Lacus Curtius were found the skeletal remains of a man, woman, and child who had been bound together and drowned. This supports the notion that legends of Mettius and Marcus Curtius are perhaps warped recollections of a very ancient sacrificial drowning ritual done when the feature was still large enough to form a pool. Alternatively, they could have been related to “profaners” mentioned in the inscription on the nearby Lapis Niger, making it a special location of punishment.

The theme is related to high-medieval Celtic stories about lake-bursts.

== In art ==
Marcus Curtius' self-sacrifice has been a popular theme since the Renaissance, depicted by Paolo Veronese, Lucas Cranach the Elder, and many others.

== Related links ==
- Curtia Gens
