= Propertius =

1st-century BC Roman elegiac poet

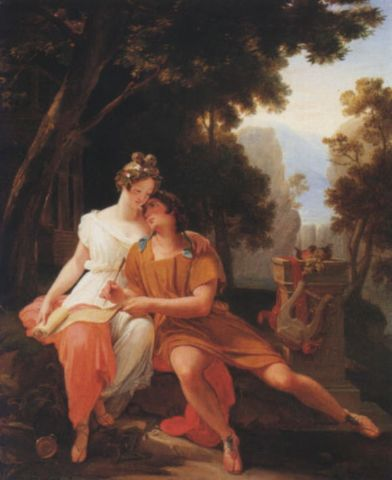
Auguste Vinchon, Propertius and Cynthia at Tivoli

Sextus Propertius was a Latin elegiac poet of the Augustan age. He was born around 50–45 BC in Assisium (now Assisi) and died shortly after 15 BC.

Propertius's surviving work comprises four books of Elegies (Elegiae). He was a friend of the poets Gallus and Virgil and, with them, had as his patron Maecenas and, through Maecenas, the emperor Augustus. Although Propertius was not as renowned in his own time as other Latin elegists, he is today regarded by scholars as a major poet.

== Life ==
Very little information exists about Propertius outside of his own writing. His praenomen "Sextus" is mentioned by Aelius Donatus, a few manuscripts list him as "Sextus Propertius", but the rest of his name is unknown. From numerous references in his poetry it is clear he was born and raised in Umbria, of a well-to-do family at or near Asisium (Assisi). His birthplace is generally regarded as modern Assisi, where tourists can view the excavated remains of a house thought to have belonged at least to the poet's family, if not to the poet himself.

During Propertius's childhood, his father died and the family lost land as part of a confiscation, probably the same one which reduced Virgil's estates when Octavian allotted lands to his veterans in 41 BC. Along with cryptic references in Ovid that imply that he was younger than his contemporary Tibullus, this suggests a birthdate after 55 BC.

After his father's death, Propertius's mother set him on course for a public career, indicating his family still had some wealth, while the abundance of obscure mythology present in his poetry indicates he received a good education. Frequent mention of friends like Tullus, the nephew of Lucius Volcatius Tullus, consul in 33 BC, plus the fact that he lived on Rome's Esquiline Hill indicate he moved among the children of the rich and politically connected during the early part of the 20s BC.

Propertius published a first book of love elegies around 30 BC, with the character 'Cynthia' as the main theme; the book's complete devotion gave it the natural title Cynthia Monobiblos. The Monobiblos must have attracted the attention of Maecenas, a patron of the arts who took Propertius into his circle of court poets. A second, larger book of elegies was published perhaps a year later, one that includes poems addressed directly to his patron and (as expected) praises for Augustus. The 19th century classics scholar Karl Lachmann argued, based on the unusually large number of poems in this book and Propertius's mention of tres libelli, that the single Book II actually comprises two separate books of poetry conflated in the manuscript tradition, an idea supported by the state of the manuscript tradition of "Book II." An editor of Propertius, Paul Fedeli, accepts this hypothesis, as does G.P. Goold, editor of the Loeb edition.

The publication of a third book came sometime after 23 BC. Its content shows the poet beginning to move beyond simple love themes, as some poems (e.g. III.5) use Amor merely as a starting point for other topics. Book IV, published sometime after 16 BC, displays more of the poet's ambitious agenda, and includes several aetiological poems explaining the origin of various Roman rites and landmarks.

Book IV, the last Propertius wrote, has only half the number of poems as Book I. Given the change in direction apparent in his poetry, scholars assume only his death a short time after publication prevented him from further exploration; the collection may in fact have been published posthumously. An elegy of Ovid dated to 2 BC makes it clear that Propertius was dead by this time.

== Poetry ==
Propertius's fame rests on his four books of elegies, totaling around 92 poems (the exact number cannot be known as over the intervening years, scholars have divided and regrouped the poems, creating doubt as to the precise number). All his poems are written using the elegiac couplet, a form in vogue among the Roman social set during the late 1st century BC.

Like the work of nearly all the elegists, Propertius's work is dominated by a figure of a single female character, one he refers to throughout his poetry by the name Cynthia. She is named in over half the elegies of the first book and appears indirectly in several others, right from the first word of the first poem in the Monobiblos:

Cynthia prima suis miserum me cepit ocellis,
contactum nullis ante cupidinibus.

— (I.1.1-2)
Translation:

Cynthia first captivated wretched me with her eyes,
I who had never before been touched by Cupid.

Whilst Apuleius identifies her as a woman named Hostia, and Propertius suggests she is a descendant of the Roman poet Hostius, modern scholarship indicates that the creation of 'Cynthia' is part of a literary convention in Roman love elegy; scripta puella, a fictionalised 'written girl'. Propertius frequently compliments her as docta puella 'learned girl', and characterises her as a female writer of verse, such as Sulpicia. This literary affair veers wildly between emotional extremes, and as a lover she clearly dominates the life of the poet's voice at least through the publication of the third book:

cuncta tuus sepelivit amor, nec femina post te
ulla dedit collo dulcia vincla meo.

— (III.15.11-2)
Translation:

Thy love has buried all others, nor has any woman after thee
put sweet fetters upon my neck.

It is difficult to precisely date many of Propertius's poems, but they chronicle the kind of declarations, passions, jealousies, quarrels, and lamentations that were commonplace subjects among the Latin elegists. The last two poems in Book III seem to indicate a final break with the character of Cynthia (versibus insignem te pudet esse meis – "It is a shame that my verses have made you famous"). In this last book Cynthia is the subject of only two poems, best regarded as a postscript. The bi-polar complexity of the relationship is amply demonstrated in a poignant, if amusing, poem from the final book. Cynthia's ghost addresses Propertius from beyond the grave with criticism (among other things) that her funeral was not lavish enough, yet the longing of the poet remains in the final line inter complexus excidit umbra meos. – "Her shade then slipped away from my embrace."

Book IV strongly indicates that Propertius was planning a new direction for his poetry. The book includes several aetiological poems which, in reviewing the mythological origins of Rome and its landmarks, can also be read as critical—even vaguely subversive—of Augustus and his agenda for the new Rome. The position is currently a subject of debate among modern classicists. The final poem is a touching address by the recently deceased Cornelia consoling her husband Lucius Aemilius Lepidus Paullus and their three children. Although the poem (given Cornelia's connection to Augustus's family) was most likely an imperial commission, its dignity, nobility, and pathos have led critics to call it the "queen of the elegies", and it is commonly considered the best in the collection.

Propertius's style is marked by seemingly abrupt transitions (in the manner of Latin neoteric poetry) and a high and imaginative allusion, often to the more obscure passages of Greek and Roman myth and legend. His idiosyncratic use of language, together with the corrupted state of the text, have made his elegies a challenge to edit; among the more famous names who have offered criticism of and emendations to the text have been the classicist John Percival Postgate and the English classicist and poet A. E. Housman.

== Textual problems ==
The text contains many syntactic, organizational and logical problems as it has survived. Some of these are no doubt exacerbated by Propertius's bold and occasionally unconventional use of Latin. Others have led scholars to alter and sometimes rearrange the text as preserved in the manuscripts.

A total of 146 Propertius manuscripts survive, the oldest of which dates from the 12th century. However, some of the poems in these manuscripts appear disjointed, such as I.8, which begins as a plea for Cynthia to abandon a planned sea voyage, then closes with sudden joy that the voyage has been called off. This poem has therefore been split by most scholars into a I.8a (comprising the first 26 lines) and I.8b (lines 27–46). More complicated organizational problems are presented by poems like II.26, a confusing piece in which Propertius first (1) dreams of Cynthia being shipwrecked, and then (2) praises Cynthia's faithfulness. Following this, he (3) declares that she plans to sail and he will come along, (4) shifts to the couple together on the shore, and then (5) quickly has them back on board ship, ready to face the potential dangers of the sea. The images seem to conflict logically and chronologically, and have led different commentators to rearrange the lines or assume some lacunae in the text.

More modern critics have pointed out that all the proposed rearrangements assume Propertius's original poetry adhered strictly to the classical literary principles as set down by Aristotle, and so the apparent jumble is a result of manuscript corruptions. Another possibility is that Propertius was deliberately presenting disjointed images in violation of principles such as the Classical Unities, a theory which argues for different unifying structures in Propertius's elegies. This interpretation also implies that Propertius's style represented a mild reaction against the orthodoxy of classical literary theory. However, although these theories may have some bearing on issues of continuity in the other three surviving books of Propertius, modern philological scholarship tends toward a consensus that the extant text "Book II" in fact represents the conflated remains of what were originally two books of poems. Recent editors of Propertius—notably Paulo Fedeli (Teubner 1984; compare G.P. Gould's 1990 revision of the Loeb text)—reflect these conclusions in their texts for "Book II", which show it as such a conflation of two books (the second and third of an original five), with some passages lost, parts of poems and whole poems combined, and possible shuffling of fragments. This case is well supported by the texts themselves and fits testimonial evidence about Propertius's original publication of his work: first the "Monobiblos" (our "Book I"), then a collection of three books (our "Book II" and Book III—the three-book elegiac format imitated by Ovid's Amores) and lastly our Book IV, very likely posthumously.

== Influence ==
Propertius himself says he was popular and even scandalous in his own day. Horace, however, says that he would have to "endure much" and "stop up his ears" if he had to listen to "Callimachus... to please the sensitive stock of poets"; Postgate and others see this as a veiled attack on Propertius, who considered himself the Roman heir to Callimachus. This judgement also seems to be upheld by Quintilian, who ranks the elegies of Tibullus higher and, while accepting that others preferred Propertius, is himself somewhat dismissive of the poet. However, Propertius's popularity is attested by the presence of his verses in the graffiti preserved at Pompeii; while Ovid, for example, drew on him repeatedly for poetic themes, more than on Tibullus.

Propertius fell into obscurity in the Middle Ages. He and Cynthia are mentioned, along with other Roman poets and their female characters, in the 12th-century goliardic poem Metamorphosis Goliae episcopi, but he was truly rediscovered during the Italian Renaissance along with the other elegists. Petrarch's love sonnets certainly show the influence of his writing, and Aeneas Silvius (the future Pope Pius II) titled a collection of his youthful elegies "Cinthia". There are also a set of "Propertian Elegies" attributed to the English writer Ben Jonson, though the authorship of these is disputed. Johann Wolfgang von Goethe's 1795 collection of "Elegies" also shows some familiarity with Propertius's poetry.

Propertius is the lyrical protagonist of Joseph Brodsky's poem "Anno Domini" (1968), originally written in Russian. His relationship with Cynthia is also addressed in Robert Lowell's poem, "The Ghost. After Sextus Propertius", which is a free translation of Propertius's Elegy IV 7.

Elena Shvarts wrote a cycle of poems as if they were the works of Propertius's love, Cynthia. She explains Cynthia's 'poems have not survived, nevertheless I have tried to translate them into Russian'.

== Modern assessment ==
In the 20th century Ezra Pound's poem "Homage to Sextus Propertius" cast Propertius as something of a satirist and political dissident, and his translation/interpretation of the elegies presented them as ancient examples of Pound's own Imagist theory of art. Pound identified in Propertius an example of what he called (in "How to Read") 'logopoeia', "the dance of the intellect among words." Gilbert Highet, in Poets in a Landscape, attributed this to Propertius's use of mythic allusions and circumlocution, which Pound mimics to more comic effect in his Homage. The imagist interpretation, the poet's tendency to sustain an interior monologue, and the deeply personal nature of his poetry have made Propertius a favorite in the modern age. In 1906 J. S. Phillimore presented a prose translation of Propertius, published by Oxford University Press. Three modern English translations of his work have appeared since 2000, and the playwright Tom Stoppard suggests in his best-known work The Invention of Love that the poet was responsible for much of what the West regards today as "romantic love". The most recent translation appeared in September 2018 from Carcanet Press, and was a Poetry Book Society Autumn Recommended Translation. The collection, entitled Poems, is edited by Patrick Worsnip with a foreword by Peter Heslin.

== Latin editions ==
- Karl Lachmann, Leipzig 1816
- Emil Baehrens, Bibliotheca Teubneriana, 1880
- John Percival Postgate, Cambridge, 1894
- john S. Phillimore, Oxford 1901
- E.A. Barber, Oxford Classical Text, 1953 (2nd ed., 1960)
- W.A. Camps, Book 1, Cambridge, 1961
- L. Richardson, Jr., Lawrence, Okla., 1977
- Rudolf Hanslik, Bibliotheca Teubneriana, 1979
- Paolo Fedeli, Bibliotheca Teubneriana, 1984
- Paolo Fedeli, Book 3, Bari, 1985
- G.P. Goold, Loeb Classical Library, 1990
- Robert J. Baker, Book 1, Warminster, 2000
- Paolo Fedeli, Book 2, Cambridge, 2005
- Giancarlo Giardina, Rome, 2005
- Simone Viarre, Collection Budé, 2005
- Gregory Hutchinson, Book 4, Cambridge, 2006
- S. J. Heyworth, Oxford Classical Text, 2007
