= Quarta Hostilia =

Quarta Hostilia was an ancient Roman matron accused and convicted of poisoning her husband, the consul Gaius Calpurnius Piso. According to Livy, a 1st-century BCE Roman historian, witnesses testified that, after her son Quintus Fulvius Flaccus had lost the consular election, an enraged Hostilia declared that she would make him consul within the next two months and should prepare for a new campaign. Livy writes that, soon afterwards, Piso—who had actually won the same election—perished, causing many in Rome to speculate that he had been murdered by Hostilia. These rumors were further inflamed when Fulvius was elected as consul suffectus in Piso's stead, which—supposedly alongside many other pieces of evidence—ultimately resulted in Hostilia's arraignment and conviction. According to the historian Martin Jehne, given that a period of two months between the announcement of candidates in a consular election and the day of the election itself was normal in the Roman Republic, the alleged statement from Hostilia is not necessarily conspicuous, and it was probably blown out of proportion following the death of Piso. Moreover, the trial of Hostilia occurred amidst the backdrop of an incipient plague that spread through Rome in the year 180 BCE. Livy records that the population of Rome presumed that this epidemic was the result of divine punishment for human crimes, and the Senate eventually appointed a praetor named Gaius Claudius to investigate cases of poisoning that might have occurred within ten miles of Rome. Jehne suggests that the accusations against Hostilia were likely fueled by the anxieties of the Roman people during these times. However, it is possible that Hostilia was innocent, and it may have been this very plague that claimed the life of Piso.
