= Marcus Curtius =

Ancient Roman legendary figure

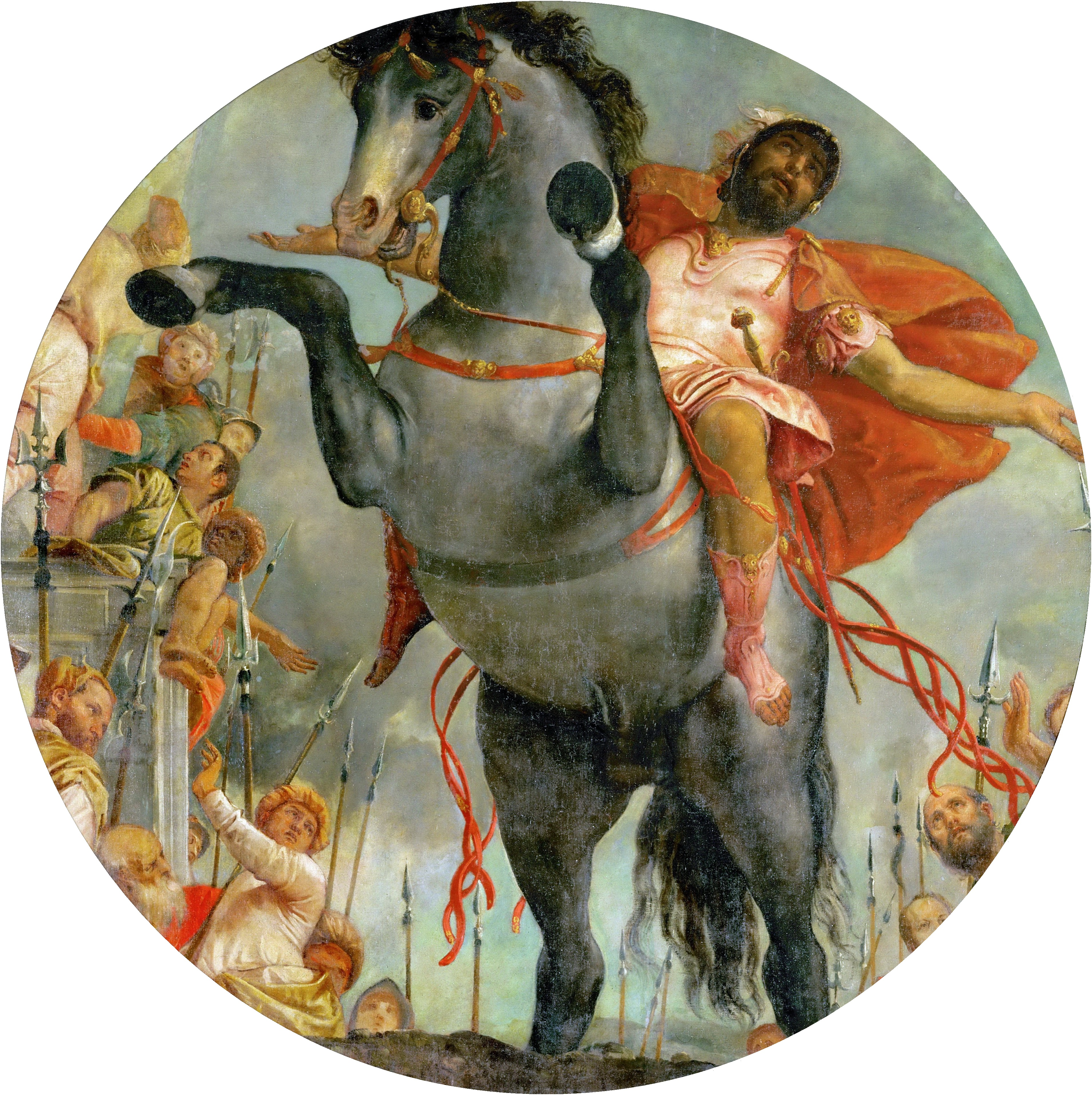
The Sacrificial Death of Marcus Curtius (1550–52) by Paolo Veronese

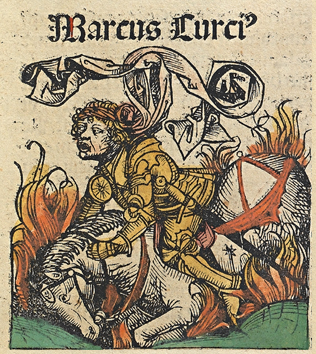
Marcus Curtius in the Nuremberg Chronicle (1493)

Marcus Curtius is a mythological young Roman who offered himself to the gods of Hades. He is mentioned shortly by Varro and at length by Livy. He is the legendary namesake of the Lacus Curtius in the Roman Forum, the site of his supposed self-sacrifice.

== Legendary biography ==
After an earthquake in 362 BC, a huge deep pit suddenly opened in the Roman Forum, which the Romans attempted to fill, but in vain. Despairing, they consulted an augur who responded that the gods demanded the most precious possession of Rome. The Romans doubted the warning, and struggled to think of what that was.

However, a young soldier named Marcus Curtius castigated them and responded that arms and the courage of Romans were the nation's most precious possessions. Astride his horse, fully and meticulously armed and decorated, Marcus rode and leapt into the chasm. Immediately, the deep pit closed over him, saving Rome.

The Lacus Curtius in the Forum was supposedly built on the site of the pit, and receives its name from him.

== Art history ==
The story of Marcus Curtius, sacrificing himself for the cause of the commonwealth, became a well-known theme during the Renaissance, due to etchings made by the German artist Lucas Cranach the Elder (1507/1508) and the Dutch artist Hendrick Goltzius (1586). It was also depicted in the famous Nuremberg Chronicle by Hartmann Schedel (1493). A bas-relief, apparently found in a garden near the Forum Romanum in 1553, seems to have been leading in most images. It dates from the Early Empire, but may have been copied from a 3rd- or 2nd-century BC piece. Benjamin Robert Haydon (1786-1846) painted a large oil entitled Curtius Leaping into the Gulf in 1842.

== See also ==
- Curtia (gens)
