= Curtius Rufus =

Roman professional magistrate of senatorial rank

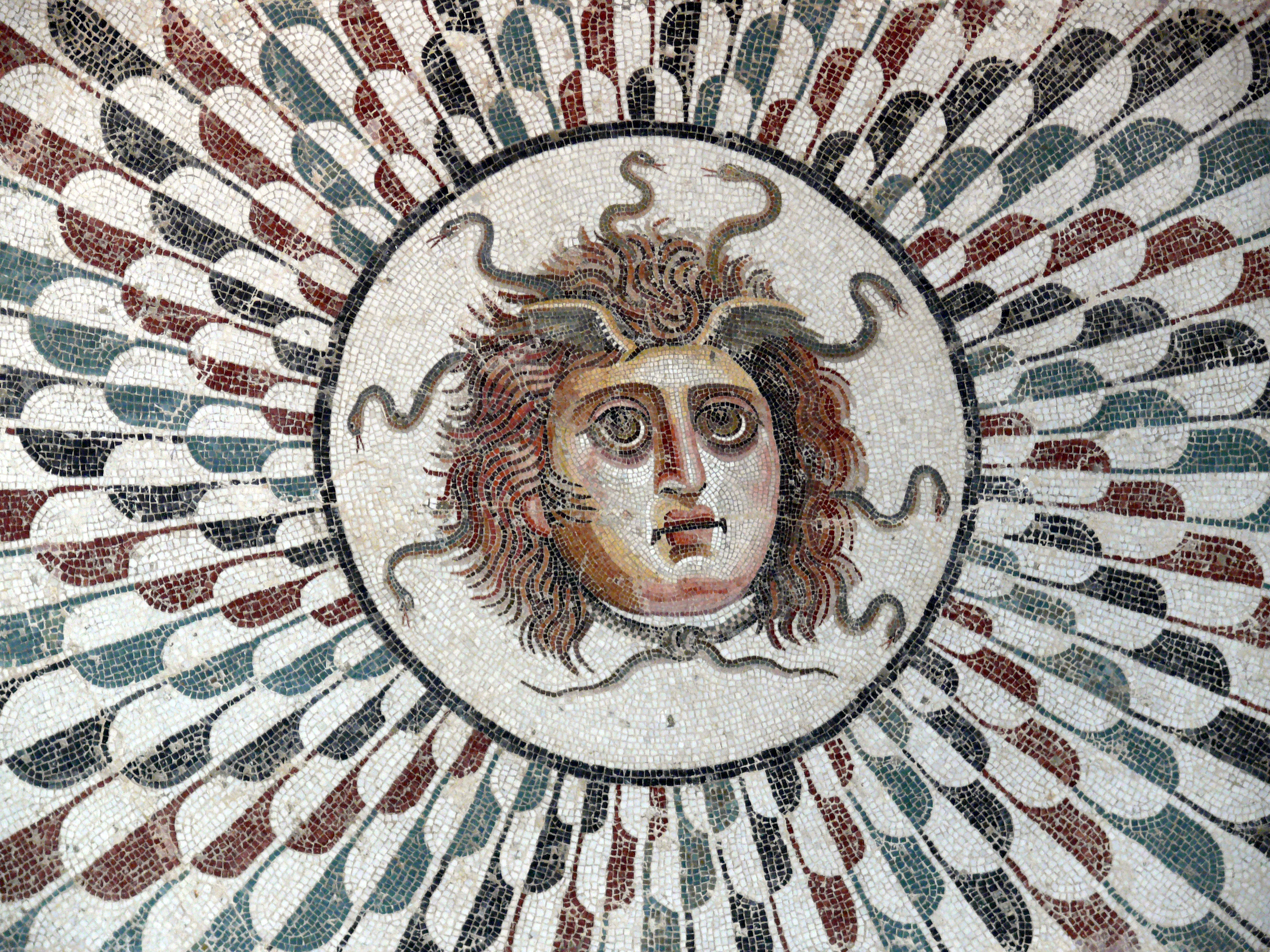
- Mosaic from the second half of the second century showing mythological figure at Roman Hadrumetum, today's Sousse, where Curtius Rufus saw the vision of a preternormal woman predicting he would be proconsul of Africa and die there.

Sectator Quaestoris

Quaestor

Praetor

Duumvir of Valence

Consul Suffectus of the Roman Empire
- In office October - December 43 CE
- Preceded by: A. Gabinius Secundus
- Succeeded by: Gaius Sallustius Crispus Passienus, Titus Statilius Taurus

Proconsul of Lower Germany

Proconsul of Africa

Personal details
- Born: 1st century, reign of Augustus, possibly 1 CE Perhaps Provence
- Died: 1st century, reign of Claudius Province of Africa
- Occupation: Career magistrate

Military service
- Allegiance: Roman Empire
- Branch/service: Overall
- Rank: Only as consular commander
- Commands: Consul of Roman Empire, Governor of Lower Germany, Governor of Africa

Curtius Rufus (/ˈkɜːrʃiəs ˈruːfəs/) was a Roman professional magistrate of senatorial rank mentioned by Tacitus and Pliny the Younger for life events occurring during the reigns of the emperors Tiberius and Claudius. In all probability, he is to be equated with the first-century Roman historian Quintus Curtius Rufus.

== Family background ==
Knowledge of Curtius Rufus’ life is a collection of isolated sources. No continuous history of the type written by Plutarch and other biographers exists. The author of a continuous history of Alexander has none of his own. Much can be inferred from the incidental sources that do exist.

=== The self-made man of mystery ===
Curtius Rufus is a curtailed name formed according to the Roman naming conventions. The Romans had a 3-name system, but for ordinary use they curtailed it to one or two elements. The three names must not be thought to apply to any but free Roman citizens. Due to the almost continuous expansion of the territory of Rome from the early Republic, the non-free and freedman populations were mainly of foreign extraction. One name sufficed for them, although freedmen might take the name of their patrons.

Curtius Rufus omits the praenomen, or first name. If the magistrate is to be identified with the historian, it must be Quintus, under the Republic spelled Quinctus, “the Fifth.” As the Romans used the same name in different generations, it may originally have had a numerical significance, but after dozens of Quinti it was perhaps just a name, abbreviated to an ignored Q. The indispensable portion of the name was the nomen, “name,” the name of the gens, “clan.” All males of the gens Curtia were named Curtius, and all females Curtia. This convention presented somewhat of a problem in distinguishing multiple Curtii, but the third name, the cognomen, offered a solution. It might have nothing to do with any convention. It could be trivial. Rufus means “red.” Over several hundred years of this system the cognomen often became an extension of the nomen for distinguishing lines within the gens. An important man would name the line, such as the Curtii Rufi.

These conventions must influence the interpretation of certain remarks made by Tacitus and Tiberius regarding Curtius Rufus’ family background. A man with the name and associations possessed by Curtius Rufus is not likely to have been a commoner, or of humble birth. However, there was a circumstance of which both men were aware, but refused discussion; that is, it fell under the category of taboo. Of it Tacitus says: "Of the birth of Curtius Rufus, whom some affirm to have been the son of a gladiator, I would not publish a falsehood, while I shrink from telling the truth." He does not say that Curtius was the son of a gladiator, but repeats that as slander, while affirming that he will not tell the truth. As he is not known for his irony or his hypocrisy, the most straightforward interpretation is exactly as he phrased it. The slander denies that the future consul was of the Curtii, a major accusation, since the Curtii were nobles from one of the earliest families at Rome. The implication is that Quintus did not share his family's consular rank because his biological father was not a Curtius.

There are only two circumstances that could account for such a story: either Quintus was not the son of his name father, or he was not the son of either father or mother; i.e., not consanguineous to the Curtii. In the first case the suppressed information must be a salacious story about Quintus’ mother, which was probably the falsehood. In the second case, Quintus could have been adopted. The taboo element might have been the fact that his biological father was the gladiator, and therefore had been a slave, although not all gladiators were slaves.

When confronted with the same story, Tiberius remarked “Curtius Rufus seems to me to be his own ancestor” (ex se natus). This remark, says Tacitus, “threw a veil over the discredit of his origin.” It is typically translated as “self-made man,” Tiberius may have meant to designate him as novus homo, a “new man”, the first member of a line to attain consular rank. He would not be that, however, for at least five years more. Tiberius may have meant that he intended to elevate Quintus. The Julio-Claudians were unfavorably impressed by legitimate pedigree, as, according to the Pax Romana instituted by Augustus, powerful nobles were a threat to peace and security, and so were suppressed.

=== Roman colonial from Provence ===
Provence in southern France today has the same name modified that it had in the Roman Empire, Provincia, “the Province.” During the Republic it was Gallia Transalpina, “Gaul over the Alps,” which the Romans colonized with settlements that became the nuclei of today's cities of southern France. In 35 BC the land on the Rhône just to the north of Marseille was of strategic interest to Octavian Caesar, the future Augustus. The river dividing around islands was easy to ford. Hannibal’s army had crossed there.

Gaius Octavius took the location away from the Celtic tribe that held it, settling a colony of Roman soldiers, the veterans of Legio II. They were sworn to his personal command. He had just recently ejected Lepidus from the Second Triumvirate, acquiring without further dispute Spain, Gaul, and Italy. He still faced Mark Antony, who held the eastern provinces. Antony did not have the will to persist to victory. After his abandonment of his own fleet at the Battle of Actium in 31 BC he died hunted in Egypt by Octavian, who became official sole imperator (“commander”) in 27 BCE. Legio II was disbanded and immediately recruited into Legio II Augusta.

Meanwhile, in 35 BC Legio II was one of two legions that had been recruited entirely in Sabina, a valley remaining to the Sabines under that name. They were Italic troops par excellence. The Sabines had contributed to the early population of Rome. The Roman Curtii in legend came from the Sabine Curtii. It would be surprising if none had joined Legio II. In 35 BCE, Legio II expelled the native Celtic population, the Cavares, from their village, Aurosia, and planted a colony there, Colonia Firma Julia Arausio Secundanorum. The land was redivided into lots by centuriation and distributed to its new owners. This location became in the Middle Ages the city of Orange, as well as a number of formerly smaller communities in the region.

In 77, Vespasian for whatever reasons, ordered a survey done and a restoration made as closely as possible to the original grant. The result was a re-publication of the adjusted plots in public cadasters of stone. The word refers to either the plots or the register, which draws a map and lists the plots. Three of these, the Orange Cadastres, were found in fragments in the Orange area, lettered A, B, and C. They have been assembled to give, with lacunae, the lands plots of the restoration of 77. Cadastre B is of known date. A and C, of similar style, probably have the same date.

Cadastre C is of interest in the biography of Quintus Curtius Rufus. In essence it says that, to the 97 2/3 non-taxable Jugera of the colony are added 15 ¾ taxable new Jugera comprising the Insulae Furianae, “Furian Islands.” The men to pay the taxes are “the heirs of Firmus Secundus”—that is, the descendants of Legio II. The phrase of interest is Q(uinto) Curtio Rufo II vir(o) et invent(ore), “Quintus Curtius Rufus being duumvir and discoverer.”

André Piganiol’s exegesis of the text is as follows. The land must have been tax-free because it was granted to Immunes. This status was probably a problem for the municipality, which should have depended on revenue from land taxes. Q. Curtius as II vir for duovir, an early form of duumvir, found a way to generate some revenue by annexing the “islands” and charging the community for them. Since the main islands in the river must already have been accounted for, the Furian Islands probably refer to islands in the wetlands. As the duumvirate would never have been given to a man not of the community, this Q. Curtius must have been one of the heredes firmi secundi. Because the date of the cadastre is 77, he might be presumed to have been the son of the historian.

Salviat modifies the argument as follows. Since the cadastres represent a restoration, they would be documenting a previous land distribution. The improvement of Cadastre C therefore might have been initiated at any time between Augustus and Vespasian. It would probably not be Vespasian's time, as it would have conflicted with the emperor's authority. There is no need to resort to a hypothetical son of Q. Curtius when he would do just as well himself.

A second problem is that duumviri performed pre-determined functions or carried out locally the orders of the emperor. A duumvir would not have had the authority to make additions to the colony on his own. Salviat's answer is that Curtius was already an imperial officer, most likely Legate of Lower Germany, and was empowered to improve land, as he was doing by trying to establish a silver mine among the Germanics. His interest in Orange derived from the fact that he was from there and had already served as duumvir. He must have preempted one of the magistracies in order to assist his home town. Such an action implies the emperor's approval, whether standing or by direction.

The story told by Salviat, based on the evidence, is that of a local youth leaving home to see the world (perhaps via the big city at Marseilles) and coming back an imperial magistrate empowered to improve communities. He manages to levy taxes without violating the original grants. Those grants, however, were somewhat larger than today's city of Orange. The total area included such cites as Avignon, Nyons and Nîmes. They became known for their gladiatorial displays, but there is no evidence of any connection of those with Curtius. Cadastres A and B cover the territory to the east and west of Orange. Cadastre C must either overlap on those or be to the north. Salviat argues that it is on the extreme northern border, and the Fossa Augusta or “Augustan Canal” is not an irrigation ditch but is a major diversion of the Rhone intended to relieve the current at a confluence and provide a length over which boats could be towed. He picks therefore Valence as the best location of Cadastre C and Curtius’ home town.

== Encounter with the numen of Africa ==
The first mention of Curtius away from home, and of his earliest position in the cursus honorum, is his "attachment" (haeserat) to "him who held Africa" (obtinenti Africam) as comes, literally a "companion," meaning a staff member. The attachment refers to his tenure of a position, for which no doubt he had applied. Pliny the Younger explains that he was tenuis, "lean;" that is, "poor," and obscurus, as are most young people beginning a career.

Tacitus states the position of Curtius' employer as quaestor, a financial officer, not the governor. Quaestor was not a military rank per se, although no doubt legions had them attached to the staff. There is no indication that Curtius had joined the army. Tacitus calls him a sectator quaestoris, where sectator, meaning at root "follower," must be the same as Pliny's comes. Curtius is said to have "grown up" (adolevit), implying that he was a youth. There is no indication that he had been to Rome yet. Apparently he had found his way from Marseilles to Africa, where running out of money (tenuis) he found a position on the quaestor's staff. The quaestor would have worked for the governor. Who the quaestor was is not stated. Curtius' position on his staff is compatible with his later efforts to improve the revenue of his home town and of Lower Germany.

While he was in Africa, Curtius seems to have had a supernatural experience, according to him, of which he made no secret; in fact, it may have helped his career in the superstitious Roman social milieu. In a letter to Lucius Licinius Sura concerning whether phantasmata are real objects, with their own "figure" (probably form) and a "divinity" (numen) or are "empty and vain" fictions of a terrified imagination; i.e., hallucinations, Pliny selects the former option because of "those things that I heard happened to Curtius Rufus".

Curtius was at leisure in a portico when he became frightened by the preter-human figure of a woman, which the Tacitean version calls a species, "appearance." Tacitus also supplies the information that the town was Adrumetum, today's Sousse in Tunisia, far from Alexandria. Pliny's account says that she said she was "Africa, harbinger of future things." She said that he would return to the province as consul (Tacitus). For the time being he would go to Rome to win honors (Pliny), then come back with the supreme authority, only to die.

== Career through the praetorship ==
Between Curtius' position as a young comes to the quaestor of the Province of Africa and his achievement of consular rank is a large gap. Tacitus says that he "departed" (digressus) to Rome, no doubt with high hopes for his future, "where through the lavish expenditure of his friends (largitione amicorum) and his own vigorous ability (acri ingenio) he obtained the quaestorship (quaesturam ... adsequitur)."

Interpretation of the passage is important for its meaning. He was "departing" Africa for the city, not returning to it. When he got there, after an unspecified time he succeeded to the quaestura. The latter is a rank rather than a specific office. There were no doubt many thousands of quaestores in and around Rome. Tacitus gives no hint of which Curtius was, or where located, or how long he held it. There is no mention of being in the army; unless he were not in it, he could not stay in Rome, except in the Praetorian Guard, the "police." Moreover, he is suddenly endowed with rich friends he did not have before, friends who were willing to supply the fortune required for the cursus.

That one of them might have been Lucius Aelius Sejanus, chief of the Praetorian Guard, close friend, confidant, and agent of Tiberius, is likely. Sejanus had demonstrated a willingness to sacrifice himself to protect the emperor by covering him with his body during an unexpected rockfall. For many years he was the de facto chief of the imperial administration, but he had other talents as well. He had a literary circle of friends that included all the talented authors of Rome. Curtius might have imbibed some of that interest in writing by association. Although the circumstantial evidence points in that direction, there is no further statement by any surviving written work.

Whatever quaestor he was, Curtius performed impressively, according to Tiberius. After an unspecified time he stood for Praetor, the next office below Consul. Tacitus says that he competed with "noble" (nobilis) candidates, but the emperor's vote was for him. The electoral body was probably the usual, the Centuriate Assembly, which, like all other institutions of government under the empire, received its direction from the emperor. The latter chose this time to make his statement about Curtius being a self-made man.

This emperor in this story seems to appear as a public figure, which may indicate that the date of his vote for Curtius is before 26, when he retired to Capri on a permanent basis, leaving the government up to his trusted friend, Sejanus. If that is the case, and the apt candidate, Curtius, was being groomed for consular rank at the minimum age of 25, then he can have been born no later than the year 1. There were far fewer praetors at Rome than quaestors, but Tacitus still does not say which he was, or where located. The praetura he mentions is a rank. Tacitus' account (a single sentence) is all too brief for the regard in which Curtius was held. There are no achievements, no friends, no family mentioned. The most credible theory is that, if Curtius was an intimate of Sejanus, he must have shared to some degree in his disgrace.

== Missing years ==
After becoming praetor, nothing further is heard of Curtius for over a decade. If he was in fact the historian, Quintus Curtius Rufus, this would have been the time when he researched his book. Since his major sources were most likely at the Library of Alexandria, he may have escaped to there. Being in the Province of Egypt, it would not have counted as Africa in the prophecy. Roman Africa was ruled from the old site of Carthage. A second possibility is that he returned to Valence to be duumvir there. He might have been to both places, but there is a total lack of evidence. It seems least likely that he would have found peace and security, or freedom of expression, in the late reign of Tiberius or that of Caligula.

== Military career ==
Rufus was awarded the triumphal ornaments by Claudius in 47 for opening up silver mines in the territory of the Mattiaci. This triumph, seemingly earned without military engagement, led to a sarcastic letter from the legions which begged Claudius to award triumphs immediately after command of an army was conferred.

== Later life ==
Tacitus notes that during a long old age of "surly sycophancy to those above him, of arrogance to those beneath him, and of moroseness among his equals", having attained the consulship in 43 (suffect for Claudius) and his triumph in 47, he received the province of Africa, where he eventually died, in accordance with the earlier prediction. Pliny also notes in his letter to Sura that he was struck down with illness upon reaching Africa after the same female figure met him upon the docks. Recounting the prophecy, he is said to have given up hope of survival, even though none of his companions were despairing.

== Notes ==
Political offices
Preceded by Aulus Gabinius Secundus, and ignotus as Suffect consuls	Suffect consul of the Roman Empire; 43 with Spurius Oppius	Succeeded by Gaius Sallustius Crispus Passienus II, and Titus Statilius Taurus as Ordinary consuls
