= Hostilia gens =

Ancient Roman family

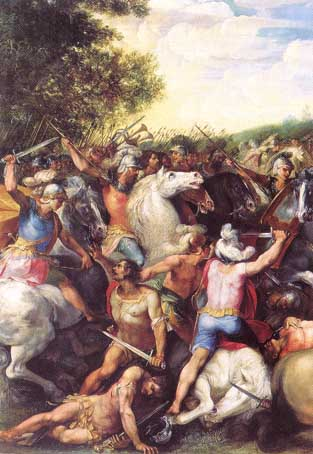
Tullus Hostilius defeating the army of Veii and Fidenae, modern fresco.

The gens Hostilia was an ancient family at Rome, which traced its origin to the time of Romulus. The most famous member of the gens was Tullus Hostilius, the third King of Rome; however, all of the Hostilii known from the time of the Republic were plebeians. Several of the Hostilii were distinguished during the Punic Wars. The first of the family to obtain the consulship was Aulus Hostilius Mancinus in 170 BC.

== Origin ==
The Hostilii came originally from Medullia, an ancient city in Latium, and are thought to have settled at Rome in the time of Romulus. Although the Hostilii of the Republic had no specific tradition about Medullia, coins minted by one of the later Hostilii bear the heads of Pallor and Pavor, the gods of fear and panic, in an allusion to Tullus Hostilius, who vowed temples to Pallor and Pavor during his war with Veii and Fidenae. If the later Hostilii were descended from the Hostilii of the regal period, then they were of Medullian origin.

The nomen Hostilius is a patronymic surname, based on the praenomen Hostus, which was borne by the ancestors of the gens. The same praenomen gave rise to another gens, with the nomen Hostius. The earliest known member of the Hostilii was Hostus Hostilius, a Roman champion in the earliest days of the city. However, if he also bore the nomen Hostilius, then that name must have originated at an earlier time. The meaning of the praenomen remains obscure; but it could possibly have originated as a variation of Faustus, another ancient name meaning fortunate; in Etruscan we find two possible cognates, the feminine praenomina Fasti and Hasti, of which the latter is a variation of the former.

== Praenomina ==
The principal first names used by the Hostilii were Aulus, Lucius, and Gaius. There are also instances of Marcus and Publius. The ancient Hostilii appear to have made regular use of the praenomen Hostus. Tullus, also used by the gens in the earliest times, appears to have been revived by the family during the later Republic. A woman of the gens is known to have used the praenomen Quarta.

== Branches and cognomina ==
The Hostilii of the Republic bore the surnames Cato, Mancinus, Saserna, and Tubulus. Of these, the Mancini were the most distinguished, with three obtaining the consulship during the second century BC. Firminus and Rutilus are found in imperial times. Some of the Hostilii do not appear to have had cognomina.

== Members ==
This list includes abbreviated praenomina. For an explanation of this practice, see filiation.

- Hostus Hostilius, of Medullia, a Roman champion in the time of Romulus, fell in battle against the Sabines.
- Hostus Hostilius Hosti f., son of Hostus Hostilius, and father of Tullus Hostilius, the third King of Rome.
- Tullus Hostilius Hosti f. Hosti n., the third King of Rome.
- Quarta Hostilia, married first Gnaeus Fulvius Flaccus, praetor in 212 BC, and second Gaius Calpurnius Piso, consul in 180 BC, whom she was convicted of poisoning.
- Marcus Hostilius, moved the site of the town of Salapia in Apulia.
- Gaius Hostilius, legate sent to Alexandria by the senate, to negotiate between Antiochus Epiphanes, King of Syria, and Ptolemy Euergetes and Cleopatra of Egypt in 168 BC.
- Hostilius, a poet, perhaps as late as the age of Cicero, known solely from a line quoted by Priscian.
- Hostilius, proposer of the lex Hostilia, permitting legal actions to be brought on behalf of persons absent due to public service, whether civil or military. The date of the law is uncertain, but a series of cases mentioned by Cicero may have been related to it.
- Tullus Hostilius, a supporter of Marcus Antonius, elected tribune of the plebs for 43 BC.
- Hostilius Rutilus, praefect of the camp in the army of Drusus in Germania, in 11 BC.
- Hostilius, a Cynic philosopher, banished by the emperor Vespasian, circa AD 72.
- Hostilius Firminus, legate of Marius Priscus, proconsul of Africa in AD 101, during the reign of Trajan; forfeited his senatorial privileges as a result of charges of extortion and cruelty.

=== Hostilii Mancini ===
- Lucius Hostilius Mancinus, an officer in the army of the dictator Quintus Fabius Maximus Verrucosus in 217 BC.
- Lucius Hostilius L. f. Mancinus, father of the consul of 145 BC.
- Aulus Hostilius L. f. A. n. Mancinus, consul in 170 BC, during the war against Perseus.
- Lucius Hostilius L. f. L. n. Mancinus, commander of the fleet during the Third Punic War, and consul in 145 BC.
- Aulus Hostilius Mancinus, probably curule aedile in 151 BC, and legate to Attalus II of Pergamon and Nicomedes II of Bythinia in 149.
- Gaius Hostilius A. f. L. n. Mancinus, praetor before 140 BC, and consul in 137, in which year he was defeated by the Numantines.

=== Hostilii Tubuli ===
- Gaius Hostilius Tubulus, praetor in 209 BC, during the Second Punic War; in 207 he inflicted heavy losses on Hannibal's army.
- Lucius Hostilius Tubulus, praetor in 142 BC, exiled for accepting bribes.
- Lucius Hostilius Tubulus, triumvir monetalis in 105 BC.

=== Hostilii Catones ===
- Aulus Hostilius Cato, praetor in 207 BC, obtained Sicilia as his province.
- Gaius Hostilius Cato, praetor with his brother in 207 BC.
- Lucius Hostilius Cato, legate of Scipio Asiaticus in 190 BC, acquitted of bribery.

=== Hostilii Sasernae ===
- Hostilius Saserna, the name of two agricultural writers, father and son, who lived in the time between Cato and Varro.
- Lucius Hostilius Saserna, triumvir monetalis in 48 BC.
- Gaius Hostilius Saserna, served with his brother, Publius, under Caesar in the African War, in 46 BC.
- Publius Hostilius Saserna, served under Caesar in the African War.

== See also ==
- List of Roman gentes
