= Casilinum =

Ancient city of Campania, Italy

Coordinates: 41.1094°N 14.2091°E

Casilinum (Ancient Greek: Κασιλῖνον) was an ancient city of Campania, Italy, situated some 3 miles north-west of the ancient Capua. The position of Casilinum at the junction of the Via Appia and Via Latina, at their crossing of the river Volturnus by a still-existing three-arched bridge, gave the town considerable strategic importance during the Roman Republic.

Casilinum was located where the modern city of Capua now stands, while the ancient Capua was located on the site of the modern Santa Maria Capua Vetere.

While the original pre-Roman town, doubtless dependent on neighboring Capua, stood entirely on the left (south) bank surrounded on three sides by the river, the Roman city extended to the right bank also. Remains of this later town have been found at some 25 feet below the modern ground-level, the river-bed having since risen considerably.

During the Second Punic War, Casilinum was first occupied by Quintus Fabius Maximus Verrucosus in 217 BCE. The town was taken by Hannibal after a gallant defence by troops from Praeneste and Perusia in the winter of 216-215 BCE, but recaptured by Roman forces the following year, thereafter serving the Romans as a base of operations against rebellious Capua.

Casilinum eventually lost its independence and became a praefectura. Caesar founded a colony at the town in 59 BCE, which was subsequently renewed by Mark Antony in 44 BCE. The veterans settled within the town took the side of Octavian after Caesar's death.

Casilinum appears to have been united with Capua sometime before the reign of Vespasian—the name of the town does not appear in the list of independent communities given by Pliny, who rather (Hist. Nat. iii.70) says that it was fallen into decay (morientis Casilini reliquiae). Only its position at the junction of major roads appears to have redeemed it from insignificance. The period of its final decline or destruction is uncertain but in the 9th century no town was on the spot.
