= Hostus Hostilius =

Roman warrior in the time of Romulus

Hostus Hostilius was a Roman warrior in the time of Romulus, and the grandfather of Tullus Hostilius, the third Roman king.

== Legend ==
In reprisal for the Rape of the Sabine Women, the Romans were attacked by forces sent by several Sabine towns. The Romans, who had anticipated rash action of this sort, quickly routed the armies of Caenina, Antemnae, and Crustumerium. But Titus Tatius, king of the Sabine city of Cures, was more cautious, and gained access to the Roman citadel through subterfuge, forcing the Romans to fight from a disadvantageous position.

The two armies advanced toward each other along the ground between the Palatine and Capitoline hills, with the Sabine champion, Mettius Curtius, in the lead. Hostus Hostilius, his Roman counterpart, met him in single combat. Although Hostus fought valiantly, Mettius had the advantage of the ground, and slew the Roman champion. (Note: The tale of this single combat is related by Livy. Plutarch says that Hostilius was slain in the battle, but does not mention a duel with Mettius Curtius. Dionysius says that Hostilius was a mighty champion during this war, but does not indicate how or when he died.) Disheartened, the Roman line broke and fled to their fortifications on the Palatine, as Mettius and the Sabines gave chase.

Unable to control his army, Romulus vowed a temple to Jupiter Stator if his men would recover their courage, and face the enemy. As if in answer to his prayer, the Romans turned before the gates of the Palatine, so suddenly that Mettius' horse took fright and bolted, (Note: In Dionysius' account, Mettius was on foot, and threw himself into the swamp in order to escape.) becoming stuck in the swampy ground that would become the Roman Forum. The Sabine charge came to a halt, uncertain of how to proceed, and concerned for the fate of their leader, who with the encouragement of his men, managed to free his horse (Note: Here too the accounts differ. In Plutarch, Mettius is only able to reach safety by abandoning his horse; in Dionysius he was always on foot.) and escape. With the battle at a standstill and the outcome in doubt, the Sabine women themselves interceded, urging their husbands and fathers not to kill one another. Romulus and Tatius agreed to a truce, and joint rulership of Rome.

According to Dionysius of Halicarnassus, Hostus' wife was Hersilia, who had led the Sabine women between the battle lines to end the war, although in the more familiar account, which Livy relates, Hersilia was the wife of Romulus. Plutarch reports both versions, noting a disagreement amongst his authorities. At his death, Hostus left a young son, who in turn was the father of Tullus Hostilius, the third King of Rome. Hostilius was buried in the Roman Forum, where a monument was set up and inscribed in honour of his bravery.

== See also ==
- Hostilia gens

== Bibliography ==
- Dionysius of Halicarnassus, Romaike Archaiologia (Roman Antiquities).
- Titus Livius (Livy), History of Rome.
- Lucius Mestrius Plutarchus (Plutarch), Lives of the Noble Greeks and Romans.
- Lucius Cassius Dio, Roman History.
