= Aventine Triad =

Ancient Roman cult of Ceres, Liber, and Libera

The Aventine Triad (also referred to as the plebeian Triad or the agricultural Triad) is a modern term for the joint cult of the Roman deities Ceres, Liber and Libera. The cult was established c. 493 BC within a sacred district (templum) on or near the Aventine Hill, traditionally associated with the Roman plebs. Later accounts describe the temple building and rites as "Greek" in style. Some modern historians describe the Aventine Triad as a plebeian parallel and self-conscious antithesis to the Archaic Triad of Jupiter, Mars and Quirinus and the later Capitoline Triad of Jupiter, Minerva and Juno. The Aventine Triad, temple and associated ludi (games and theatrical performances) served as a focus of plebeian identity, sometimes in opposition to Rome's original ruling elite, the patricians.

== Origins ==
The Aventine relationship between Ceres, Liber and Libera was probably based first on their functions as agricultural and fertility deities of the plebs as a distinct social group. Liber had been companion to both Ceres and to Libera in separate and disparate fertility cults that were widespread throughout the Hellenised Italian peninsula, long before their official adoption by Rome – or rather, their partial assimilation, as Ceres' own cult appears to have been considered more tractable and obedient than Liber's. Their Aventine cults, reported in later Roman sources as distinctively Greek in character, may have been further reinforced and influenced by their perceived similarities to particular Greek deities: Ceres to Demeter, Liber to Dionysus (Roman Bacchus) and Libera to either Persephone (Roman Proserpina) or Ariadne. In keeping with Roman theology, the internal and external equivalence of the Aventine Triad remained speculative, broad and flexible. Long after its establishment, Cicero rejects the equivalence of Liber and Dionysus and asserts that Ceres is mother to Liber and Libera.

== Foundation ==
The Aventine Triad was established soon after the overthrow of the Roman monarchy and establishment of the Republic. Rome's majority of citizen commoners (plebs) were ruled by the patricians, a small number of powerful, landed aristocrats who asserted a traditional, exclusive right to Rome's highest religious, political and military offices. The plebs not only served in Rome's legions: they were the backbone of its economy – smallholders, labourers, skilled specialists, managers of landed estates, vintners, and importers and exporters of grain and wine. Against a background of famine in Rome, an imminent war against the Latins and a threatened plebeian secession, the dictator A. Postumius vowed a temple to the patron deities of the plebs, Ceres, Liber and Libera on or near the Aventine Hill. The famine ended and Rome's plebeian citizen-soldiery co-operated in the conquest of the Latins. In 493 BC, a new built temple on or near the Aventine Hill was dedicated to the Triad and Rome's first recorded ludi scaenici (religious dramas) were held in honour of Liber, for the benefit of the Roman people. Liber's festival, the Liberalia, may date from this time.

Patrician dominance was manifest in the Capitoline Triad of Jupiter, Mars and Quirinus on the Capitoline Hill, at the heart of the city. The Capitoline temple lay within Rome's sacred boundary (pomerium). The Aventine lay outside it. In most versions of the Roman founding myth, this was the hill on which the unfortunate Remus lost to his brother Romulus in a contest of augury to decide Rome's foundation, name and leadership. Postumius' vow has been interpreted as a pragmatic, timely recognition of the plebeian citizenry as a distinct social and political grouping with its own values, interests and traditions; the vow may have intended confirmation of the plebs and their deities as fully Roman, but its fulfillment focused plebeian culture and identity on a Triad of deities only part-assimilated into official Roman religion. Some aspects of their cults were still considered morally "un-Roman" by Rome's authorities. Thus, the Aventine Triad gave the plebs what has been variously described by modern historians as a parallel to the official Capitoline Triad, and its "copy and antithesis". Among other religious innovations based on his antiquarian interests, the emperor Claudius redrew the pomerium to encompass the Aventine.

== Development ==
The plebs continued to establish and administer their own laws (plebiscita) and held formal assemblies from which patricians were excluded,. They elected their own magistrates and sought religious confirmation of their decisions through their own augury, which in plebeian religious tradition had been introduced by Marsyas, a satyr or silen in the entourage of Liber. Meanwhile, the plebeian tribunes, an emergent plebeian nobility and a small but growing number of popularist politicians of patrician ancestry gained increasing influence over Rome's religious life and government. Any person who offended against the sacred rights and person of a plebeian tribune was liable to declaration as homo sacer, who could be killed with impunity and whose property was, almost certainly, forfeit to Ceres. Even so, official Ludi Cereales were not established until as late as 202 BC. Liber's festival and the Bacchic or Dionysian aspects of his cult were suppressed under the ferocious Senatus consultum de Bacchanalibus of 186 BC. The Liberalia rites were transferred to Cerealia; after a few years they were restored to Liber.

Varro's complex, investigative Late Republican theology groups Ceres with Tellus and Venus, therefore (in Varronian reasoning) with Victoria; and Ceres with Libera, when the latter is understood as the female aspect of Liber.

== Cults and priesthoods ==
Evidence is lacking for the earliest priesthoods of the Aventine Triad, whether in joint or individual cult to its deities. The plebeian aediles, named after their service of aedes (shrine or temple) may have acted as cult priests for their community and may have served Liber and Libera in this capacity. Ceres was served by a flamen Cerealis, usually a plebeian. His duties included the invocation of her assistant deities and cult service to the earth-goddess Tellus. From c. 205 BC, a joint mystery cult to Ceres and Proserpina was held at the Aventine Triad's temple, in addition to its older rites. This ritus graecus cereris recognised Libera as equivalent to Proserpina. Liber's involvement, if any, is unknown. Initiation was reserved to women, and the cult was served by priestesses of high social caste. According to Cicero, men were forbidden to look on Ceres' cult image; this could imply the use of separate cult images, or the use of the same images in different, gender-segregated rites.

== Temple ==
The Aventine Triad's temple was known by the name of its leading deity – thus, Roman sources describe it as the Temple of Ceres, though within it, each deity had a separate internal sanctuary (cella). The temple served as a cult centre for the patron deities of the plebs, a sacred depository for plebeian records and the headquarters for the plebeian aediles; the minutes or conclusions of senatorial decrees were also placed there, under the protection of Ceres as the guardian of laws on behalf of the Roman people. While the original temple fabric and furnishings may have been funded in whole or part by its patrician sponsors, its cult images and perhaps its maintenance were supported partly through voluntary offerings and partly through the fines collected by the plebeian aediles from those who infringed plebeian civil and religious laws. By the late Republic, it may have fallen into disrepair: Augustus undertook its restoration, which was completed by his successor Tiberius. Pliny the Elder's later description of its style and designers as "Greek" are taken as further evidence of continued plebeian cultural connections with Magna Graecia, officially funded well into the Imperial era. No trace remains of the temple building, and the historical and epigraphical record offers only sparse details to suggest its exact location.
