= Archaic Triad =

Triad of Jupiter, Mars, and Quirinus

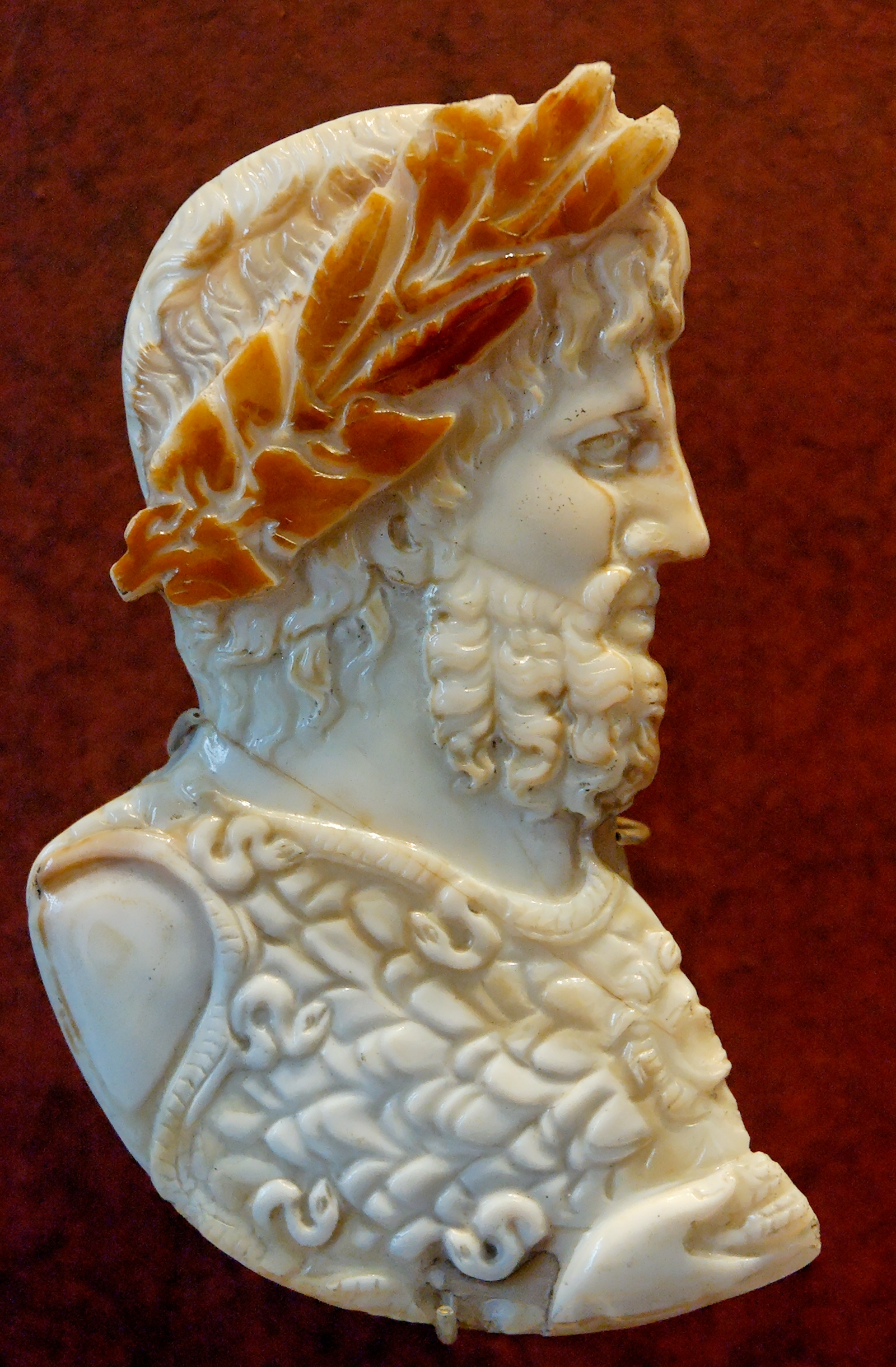
Jupiter

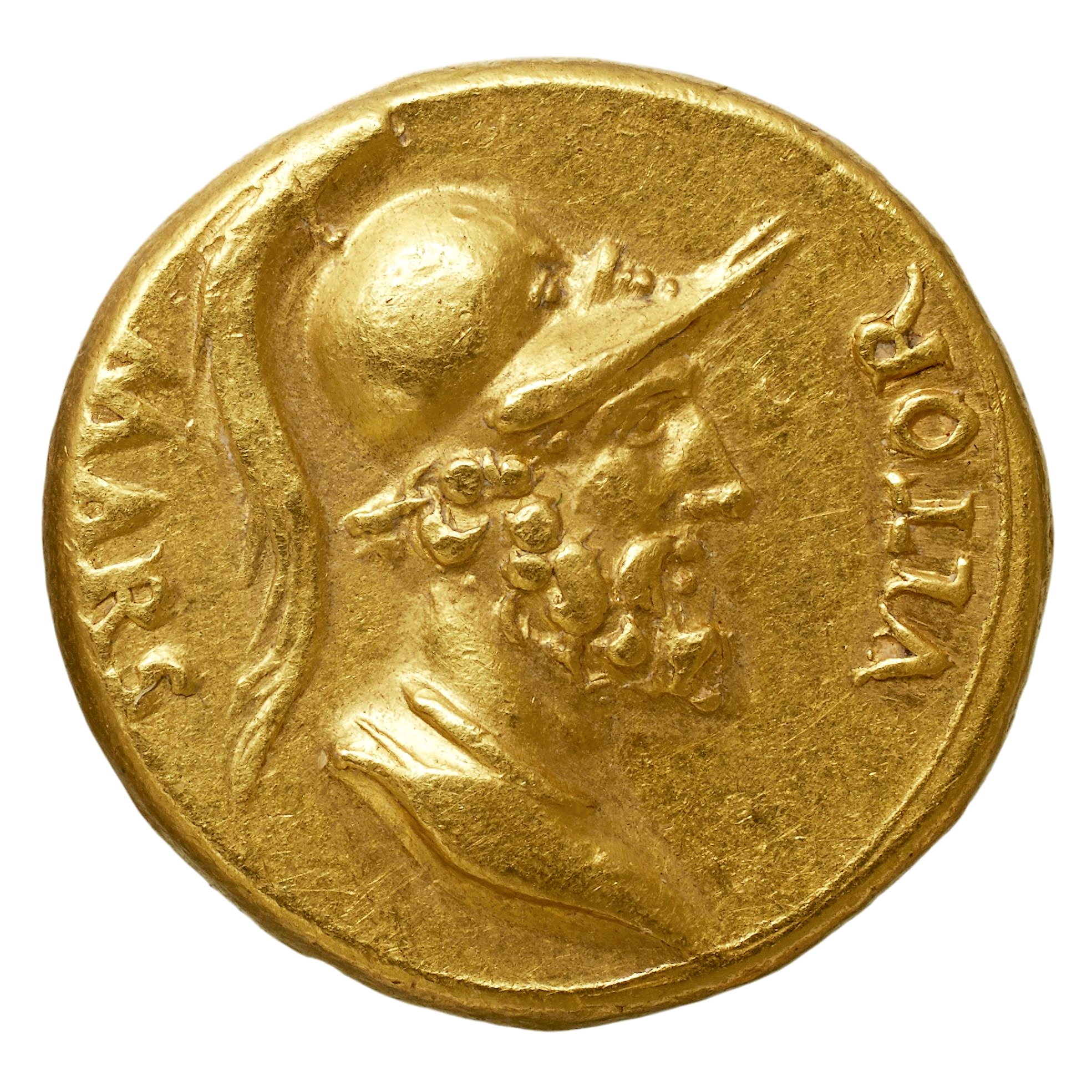
Mars

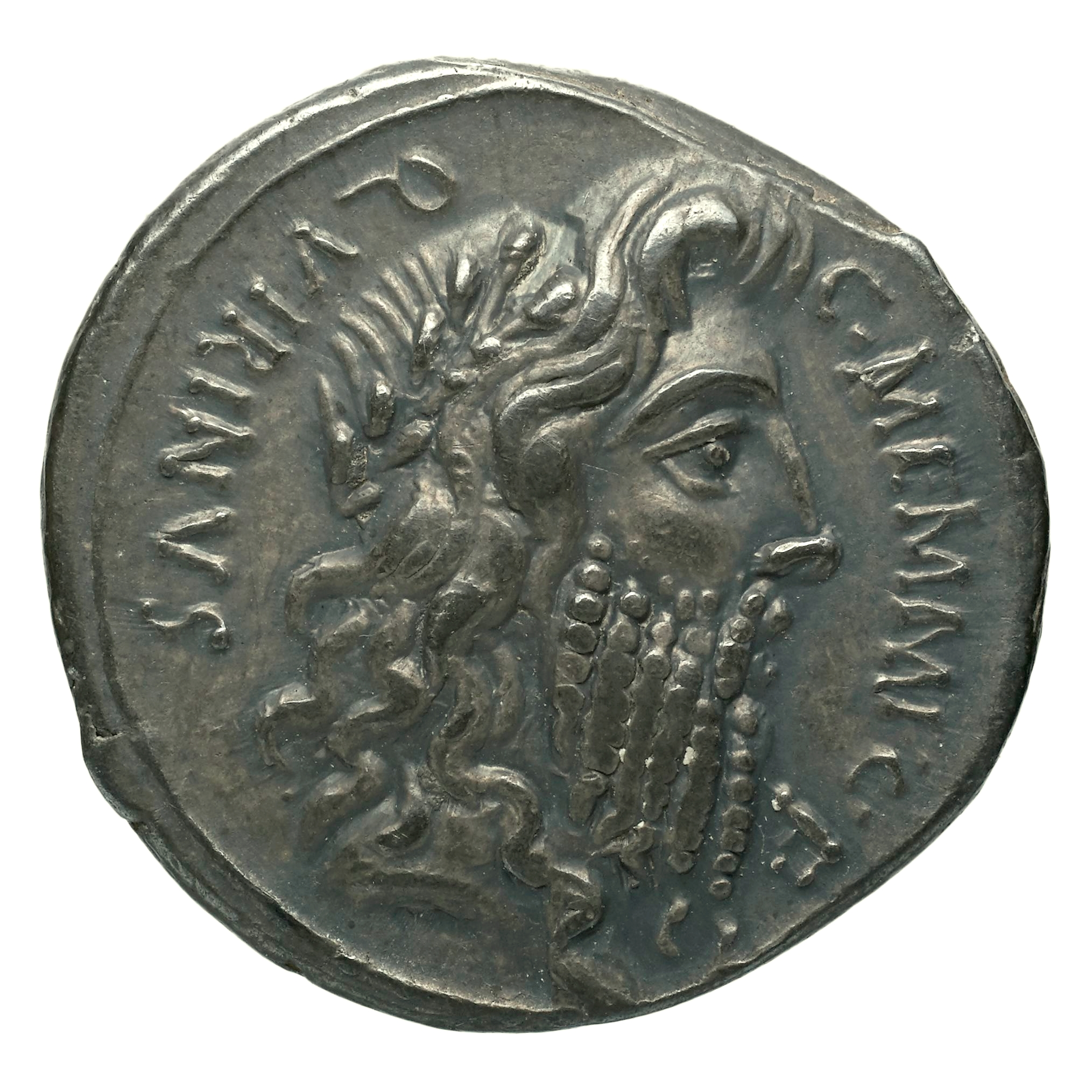
Quirinus

The three gods

The Archaic Triad is a hypothetical divine triad, supposed to consist of the presumed three original deities worshipped on the Capitoline Hill in Rome: Jupiter, Mars, and Quirinus. This structure was no longer clearly detectable in later times; only traces of it have been identified from various literary sources and other testimonies, and many scholars dispute the validity of this identification.

== Description ==
Georg Wissowa, in his manual of the Roman religion, identified the structure as a triad on the grounds of the existence in Rome of the three flamines maiores, who carry out service to these three gods. He remarked that this triadic structure looks to be predominant in many sacred formulae which go back to the most ancient period and noted its pivotal role in determining the ordo sacerdotum, the hierarchy of dignity of Roman priests: Rex Sacrorum, Flamen Dialis, Flamen Martialis, Flamen Quirinalis, and Pontifex Maximus in order of decreasing dignity and importance. He remarked that since such an order no longer reflected the real influence and relationships of power among priests in the later times, it should have reflected a hierarchy of the earliest phase of Roman religion. (Note: Wissowa (1912) cited the following sources as supporting the existence of this triad: Servius ad Aeneidem VIII 663 on the ritual of the Salii, priests who use the ancilia in their ceremonies and are under the patronage of Jupiter, Mars, and Quirinus; Polybius Hist. III 25, 6 in occasion of a treaty stipulated by the fetials between Rome and Carthage; Livy VIII 9, 6 in the formula of the devotio of Decius Mus; Festus s.v. spolia opima, along with Plutarch Marcellus 8, Servius ad Aeneidem VI 860 on the same topic.)

Wissowa identified the presence of such a triad also in the Umbrian ritual of Iguvium where only Iove, Marte, and Vofionus were granted the epithet Grabovius, and the fact that in Rome the three flamines maiores are all involved in a peculiar way in the cult of goddess Fides.

However Wissowa did not pursue further the analysis of the meaning and function of the structure (which he called Göttersystem) he had identified.

=== Dumézil's analysis ===
Georges Dumézil in various works, particularly in his Archaic Roman Religion advanced the hypothesis that this triadic structure was a relic of a common Proto-Indo-European religion, based on a trifunctional hypothesis modeled on the division of that archaic society into three classes of decreasing status. The highest deity (or pair of deities) would be a heavenly sovereign endowed with religious, magic, and legal powers and prerogatives, associated in human society with both the king and with priestly and sacral lore. The second in order of dignity by the deity representing bravenery and military prowess, associated with the class of warriors. Third, a deity representing the common human worldly values of wealth, fertility, and pleasure, associated with the class of economic producers, such as merchants, craft-makers, and farmers. According to the hypothesis, such a tripartite structure must have been common to all Indo-European peoples on accounts of its widespread traces in religion and myths from India to Scandinavia, and from Rome to Ireland. However it had disappeared from most societies since prehistoric times, with the notable exception of India.

In Vedic religion, the first, sovereign function was incarnated by Dyaus Pita and later appeared split into its two aspects: On one hand, an uncanny and awe-inspiring almighty power, incarnated as Varuna, and on the other hand, a source and guardian of justice and compacts incarnated as Mitra. The second, military function was incarnated by Indra. The third function of production, wealth, fertility, and pleasure was incarnated by the twin Ashvins (or Nasatya twins). In human society, the raja and the class of brahmin priests represented the first function (and enjoyed the highest dignity); the warrior class of the kshatriya represented the second function; and the vaishya class of artisans and merchants, the third.

Similarly in Rome, Jupiter was the supreme ruler of the heavens and god of thunder, represented on earth by the rex, king (later the rex sacrorum) and his substitute, the Flamen Dialis, the legal aspect of sovereignty being incarnated also by Dius Fidius, Mars was the god of military prowess and a war deity, represented by his flamen Martialis; and Quirinus the enigmatic god of the Roman populus ("people") organised in the curiae as a civilian and productive force, represented by the Flamen Quirinalis.

Apart from the analysis of the texts already collected by Wissowa, Dumézil stressed the importance of the tripartite plan of the regia, the cultic centre of Rome and official residence of the rex. As recorded by sources and confirmed by archeological data it was devised to lodge the three major deities Iupiter, Mars, and Ops, the deity of agricultural plenty, in three separate rooms.

The cult of Fides involved the three Flamines Maiores: They were carried to the sacellum of the deity together in a covered carriage and officiated with their right hand wrapped up to the fingers in a piece of white cloth. The association with the deity that founded divine order (Fides is associated with Iupiter in his function of guardian of the supreme juridical order) underlines the mutual interconnections among them and of the gods they represented with the supreme heavenly order, whose arcane character was represented symbolically in the hidden character of the forms of the cult.

The spolia opima were dedicated by the person who had killed the king or chief of the enemy in battle. They were dedicated to Jupiter in case the Roman was a king or his equivalent (consul, dictator or tribunus militum consulari potestate), to Mars in case he was an officer and to Quirinus in case he was common soldier. (Note: In Spolia opima p. 302 L 2nd, s.v.; Sextus Pompeius Festus writes Ianus Quirinus, which possibly identifies Quirinus as an epithet of Ianus.) The sacrificial animals too were in each case that of the respective deity, i.e. an ox to Jupiter, solitaurilia to Mars, and a male lamb to Quirinus.

Furthermore, Dumézil analysed the cultural functions of the Flamen Quirinalis to better understand the characters of this deity. One important element was his officiating on the feriae of the Consualia aestiva ( of the Summer), which associated Quirinus to the cult of Consus and indirectly of Ops (Ops Consivia). Other feriae on which this flamen officiated were the Robigalia, the Quirinalia that Dumezil identifies with the last day of the Fornacalia, also named stultorum feriae because on that day the people who had forgot to roast their spelt on the day prescribed by the curio maximus for their own curia were given a last chance to make amends, and the Larentalia held in memory of Larunda. These religious duties show Quirinus was a civil god related to the agricultural cycle and somehow to the worship of Roman ancestry.

In Dumézil's view, the figure of Quirinus became blurred and started to be connected to the military sphere because of the early assimilation to him of the divinised Romulus, the warring founder and first king of Rome. A coincident facilitating factor of this interpretation was the circumstance that Romulus carried with himself the quality of twin and Quirinus had a correspondence in the theology of the divine twins such the Indian Ashvins and the Scandinavian Vani. The resulting interpretation was the mixed personality of the god as civil and military, warring and peaceful.

A detailed discussion of the sources is devoted by Dumézil to showing that they do not support the theory of an agrarian Mars: Mars would be invoked both in the Carmen Arvale and in Cato's prayer as the guardian – the armed protector – of the fields and the harvest. He is definitely not presented as a deity of agricultural plenty and fertility.

It is also noteworthy that according to tradition Romulus established the double role and duties, civil and military, of the Roman citizen. In this way the relationship between Mars and Quirinus became a dialectic one, since Romans would regularly pass from the warring condition to the civil one and vice versa. In the yearly cycle this passage is marked by the rites of the Salii, they themselves divided into two groups, one devoted to the cult of Mars (Salii Palatini, created by Numa) and the other of Quirinus (Salii Collini, created by Tullus Hostilius).

In Dumézil's view, the archaic triad was not strictly speaking a triad, but rather a structure underlying the earliest religious thought of the Romans, a reflection of the common Indoeuropean heritage.

This grouping has been interpreted as a symbolic representation of early Roman society, wherein Jupiter, standing in for the ritual and augural authority of the Flamen Dialis (high priest of Jupiter) and the chief priestly colleges, represents the priestly class, Mars, with his warrior and agricultural functions, represents the power of the king and young nobles to bring prosperity and victory through sympathetic magic with rituals like the October Horse and the Lupercalia, and Quirinus, with his source as the deified form of Rome's founder Romulus and his derivation from co-viri ("men together") representing the combined military and economic strength of the Roman people.

According to Dumézil's trifunctional hypothesis, this three-way division symbolizes the overarching societal classes of "priest" (Jupiter), "warrior" (Mars), and "farmer" or "civilian" (Quirinus). Although both Mars and Quirinus each had militaristic and agricultural aspects, leading later scholars to frequently equate the two despite their clear distinction in ancient Roman writings, Dumézil argued that Mars represented the Roman patricians when serving as soldiers, Quirinus represented them in their civilian activities. Although such a distinction is implied in a few Roman passages, such as when Julius Caesar scornfully calls his soldiers quirites ("citizens") rather than milites ("soldiers"), the word quirites had by this time been dissociated from the god Quirinus, and it is likely that Quirinus initially had an even more militaristic aspect than Mars, but that over time Mars, in part through synthesis with the Greek god Ares, became more warlike, while Quirinus became more civic in connotation. Resolving these inconsistencies and complications is difficult, chiefly because of the ambiguous and obscure nature of Quirinus' cult and worship, of which even Romans of the late Republic were uncertain. Mars and Jupiter remained the most popular of all Roman gods, but Quirinus was a more archaic and opaque deity, diminishing in importance over time.
