= Sacerdos Liberi =

Ancient Roman priestess

Sacerdos Liberi or sacerdos Liberi publica was the title of the Priestess of the god Liber and the goddess Libera in Ancient Rome.

The priestesses of Liber officiated over the Liberalia in Ancient Rome on 17 March. Marcus Terentius Varro described them as old women, who sold cookies during the Liberalia festival. Liber's festivals are timed to the springtime awakening and renewal of fertility in the agricultural cycle. In Rome, his annual Liberalia public festival was held on March 17. A portable shrine was carried through Rome's neighbourhoods (vici); Liber's aged, ivy-crowned priestesses offered honey cakes for sale, and offered sacrifice on behalf of those who bought them
