= Proculus Julius =

Early Roman, witness to Romulus' apotheosis

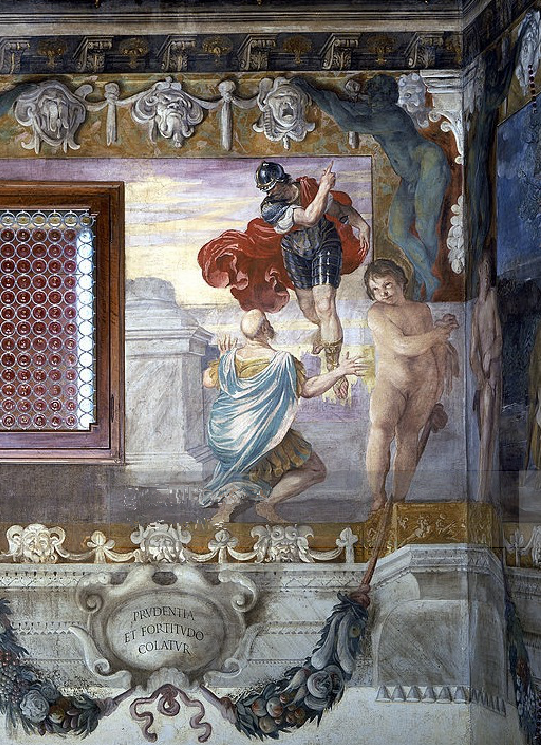
Carracci, Romolo appare a Proculo, (16c.)Palazzo Magnani, Bologna

Proculus Julius is a figure in the legendary history of the Roman Kingdom. His reported visitation by King Romulus, Rome's putative founder and first ruler, shortly after the king's disappearance convinces the people of Rome to accept Romulus' divinity and the claims by the senate that he had been taken up by the gods in a whirlwind.

== Livy's account ==
In the Augustan-era historian Livy's From the Founding of the City, Romulus is attending a public review of the army at Palus Caprae when a sudden, violent storm envelops him in mist. When it clears, the King is gone. The nobles sitting near him claimed that he had been carried into the sky by a divine force. The commoners present hail their now lost king and proclaim him a god. Despite this, Livy relates that there was among a few people found the suspicion that the nobles had killed and dismembered him. Proculus is described by Livy as being a trusted authority on "magnae rei" (great/supernatural events). He tells the people that at dawn, a vision of Romulus descended from the sky and told him that Rome would become the ruler of the world. Livy notes the readiness of the Roman people in accepting Julius's testimony as being "mirum" (extraordinary).

== Plutarch's account ==
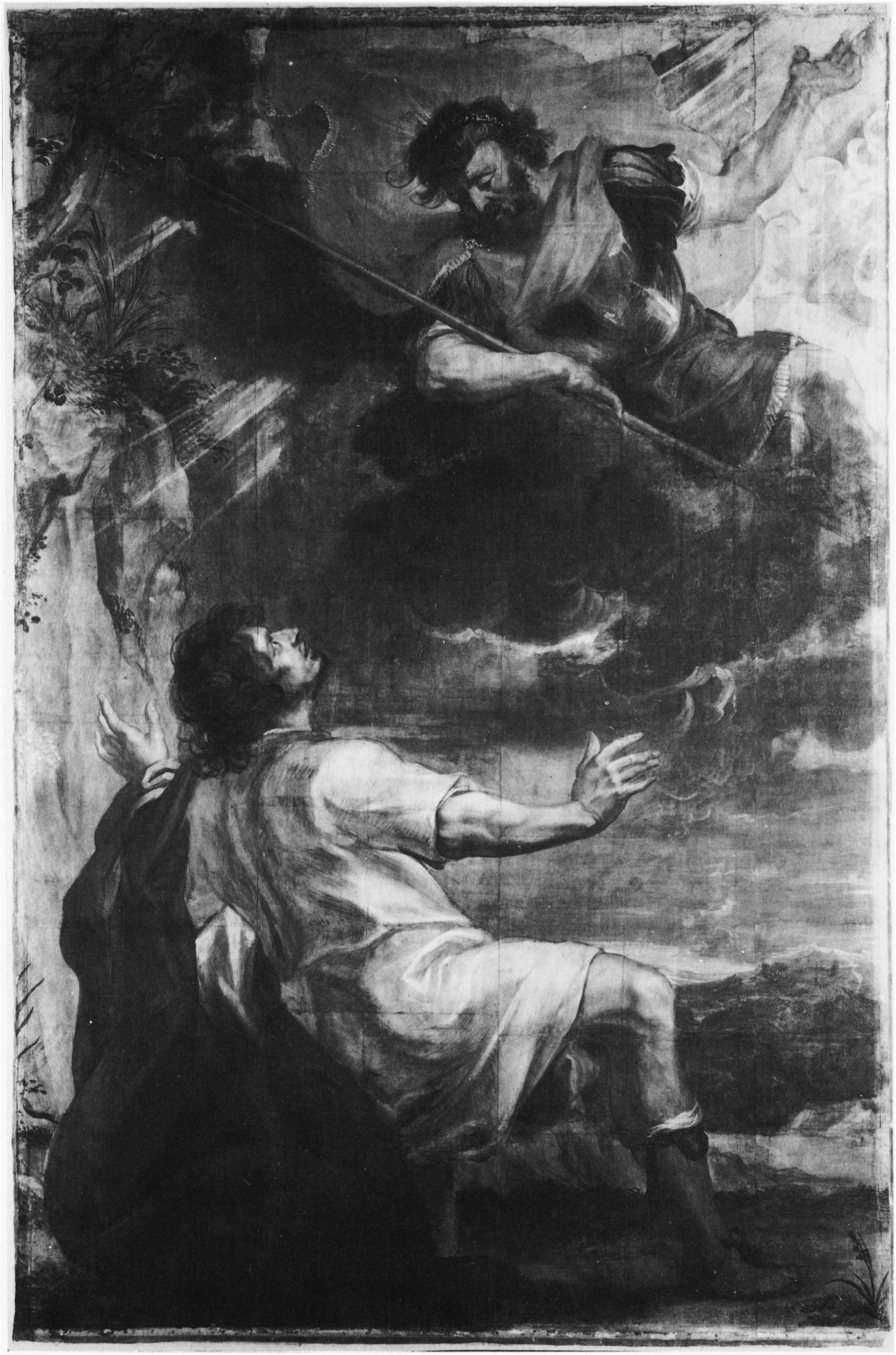
Rubens Apparizione di Romolo e Proculo, (17c.) National Museum of Wales, Cardiff

Plutarch tells a more detailed tale of Romulus' death. He lists several alternative stories, and then the tale of his disappearance at the assembly. Proculus was a friend of the king. He was a Roman colonist from the city of Alba. Before testifying to the Forum, he swore a sacred oath and then told the assembled that Romulus had descended from the sky in front of him. Proculus tells the assembly that he had asked Romulus why he had left them as he did, leaving so many in mourning and suspicions about his disappearance. Romulus explains that it was the will of the gods that he leave. He came to Earth to build a city destined to be the greatest on earth and now, his work was done. Rome, with "self-restraint" and "valor" will be the most dominant force on earth. Finally he tells Proculus that he will always watch over them as Quirinus. Because of his character and the oath, and, Plutarch adds, a divine force that came over the people, they abandoned their suspicion and anger.

== See also ==
- Julia gens
- Resurrection
