= Liber =

Roman God

- God of wine-making, wine, male fertility, freedom
- Member of the di selecti and the Aventine Triad
- Festivals: Liberalia

Equivalents
- Etruscan: Fufluns
- Greek: Dionysus

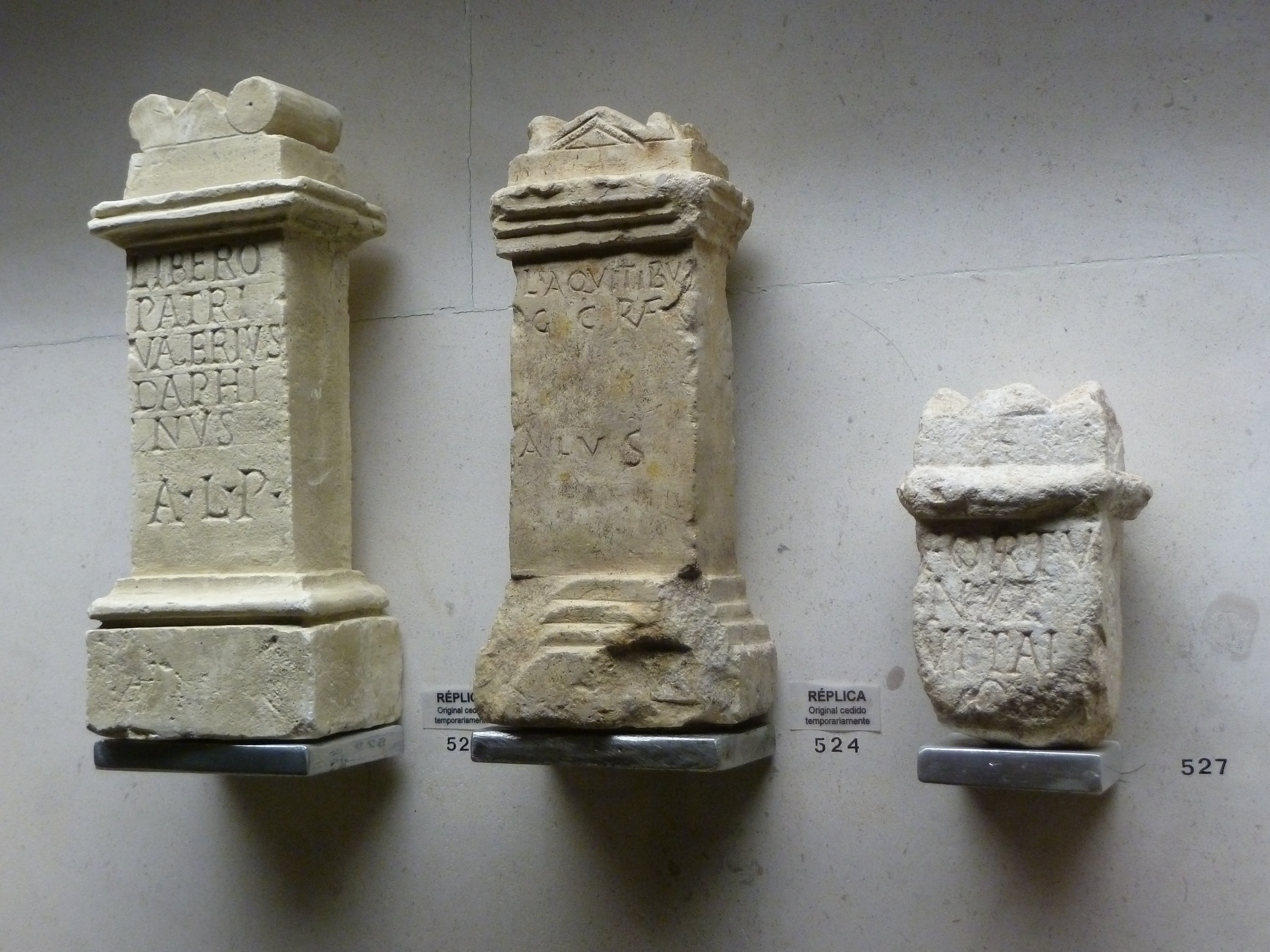
Three Roman votive pillars; the one on the left reads Libero Patri Valerius Daphinus a[nimo] l[ibens] p[osuit]: "Valerius Daphinus erects [this monument] to Liber Pater of his free will."

In ancient Roman religion and mythology, Liber (/ˈlaɪbər/ LY-bər, Latin: [ˈliːbɛr]; "the free one"), also known as Liber Pater ("the free Father"), was a god of viticulture and wine, male fertility and freedom. He was a patron deity of Rome's plebeians and was part of their Aventine Triad. His festival of Liberalia (March 17) became associated with free speech and the rights attached to coming of age. His cult and functions were increasingly associated with Romanised forms of the Greek Dionysus/Bacchus, whose mythology he came to share.

== Etymology ==
The name Līber ('free') stems from Proto-Italic *leuþeros, and ultimately from Proto-Indo-European *h₁lewdʰeros ('belonging to the people', hence 'free').

== Origins and establishment ==
Before his official adoption as a Roman deity, Liber was companion to two different goddesses in two separate, archaic Italian fertility cults; Ceres, an agricultural and fertility goddess of Rome's Hellenized neighbours, and Libera, who was Liber's female equivalent. In ancient Lavinium, he was a phallic deity. Latin liber means "free", or "free one"; when coupled with "pater", it means "The Free Father", who personifies freedom and champions its attendant rights, as opposed to dependent servitude. "Liber" is also understood in terms of "libation", the ritual offering of drink, related to Greek "spondé" and English "to spend". Roman writers of the late Republic and early Empire offer various etymological and poetic speculations based on this trope, to explain certain features of Liber's cult.

Liber entered Rome's historical tradition soon after the overthrow of the Roman monarchy, the establishment of the Republic and the first of many threatened or actual plebeian secessions from Rome's patrician authority. According to Livy, the dictator A. Postumius vowed games (ludi) and a joint public temple to a Triad of Ceres, Liber and Libera on Rome's Aventine Hill, c. 496 BC. In 493 the vow was fulfilled: the new Aventine temple was dedicated and ludi scaenici (religious dramas) were held in honour of Liber, for the benefit of the Roman people. These early ludi scaenici have been suggested as the earliest of their kind in Rome, and may represent the earliest official festival to Liber, or an early form of his Liberalia festival. The formal, official development of the Aventine Triad may have encouraged the assimilation of its individual deities to Greek equivalents: Ceres to Demeter, Liber to Dionysus and Libera to Persephone or Kore.

Liber's patronage of Rome's largest, least powerful class of citizens (the plebs, or plebeian commoners) associates him with particular forms of plebeian disobedience to the civil and religious authority claimed by Rome's Republican patrician elite. The Aventine Triad has been described as parallel to the Capitoline Triad of Jupiter, Mars and Quirinus on the Capitoline Hill, within the city's sacred boundary (pomerium): and as its "copy and antithesis". The Aventine Triad was apparently installed at the behest of the Sibylline Books but Liber's position within it seems equivocal from the outset. He was a god of the grape and of wine; his early ludi scaenici virtually defined their genre thereafter as satirical, subversive theatre in a lawful religious context. Some aspects of his cults remained potentially un-Roman and offered a focus for civil disobedience. Liber asserted plebeian rights to ecstatic release, self-expression and free speech; he was Liber Pater, the Free Father – a divine personification of liberty, father of plebeian wisdoms and plebeian augury.

=== Liber, Bacchus and Dionysus ===
Liber's associations with wine, inebriation, uninhibited freedom and the subversion of the powerful made him a close equivalent to the Greek god Dionysus, who was Romanised as Bacchus. In Graeco-Roman culture, Dionysus was euhemerised as a historical figure, a heroic saviour, world-traveller and founder of cities; and conqueror of India, whence he had returned in the first ever triumph, drawn in a golden chariot by tigers, accompanied by a retinue of drunken satyrs and maenads. In some cults, and probably in the popular imagination, Liber was gradually assimilated to Bacchus and came to share his Romanised "Dionysian" iconography and myths. Pliny calls him "the first to establish the practice of buying and selling; he also invented the diadem, the emblem of royalty, and the triumphal procession." Roman mosaics and sarcophagi attest to various representations of this exotic triumphal procession. In Roman and Greek literary sources from the late Republic and Imperial era, several notable triumphs feature similar, distinctively "Bacchic" processional elements, recalling the supposedly historic "Triumph of Liber".

=== Liber and the Bacchanalia of 186 BC ===
Very little is known of Liber's official and unofficial cults during the early to middle Republican era. Their Dionysiac or Bacchic elements seem to have been regarded as tolerably ancient, home-grown and manageable by Roman authorities until 186 BC, shortly after the end of the Second Punic War. Livy, writing 200 years after the event, gives a highly theatrical account of the Bacchanalia's introduction by a foreign soothsayer, a "Greek of mean condition... a low operator of sacrifices". The cult spreads in secret, "like a plague". The lower classes, plebeians, women, the young, morally weak and effeminate males ("men most like women") are particularly susceptible: all such persons have leuitas animi (fickle or uneducated minds) but even Rome's elite are not immune. The Bacchanalia's priestesses urge their deluded flock to break all social and sexual boundaries, even to visit ritual murder on those who oppose them or betray their secrets: but a loyal servant reveals all to a shocked senate, whose quick thinking, wise actions and piety save Rome from the divine wrath and disaster it would otherwise have suffered. Livy's dramatis personae, stylistic flourishes and tropes probably draw on Roman satyr-plays rather than the Bacchanalia themselves.

The Bacchanalia cults may have offered challenge to Rome's traditional, official values and morality but they were practiced in Roman Italy as Dionysiac cults for several decades before their alleged disclosure, and were probably no more secretive than any other mystery cult. Nevertheless, their presence at the Aventine provoked an investigation. The consequent legislation against them – the Senatus consultum de Bacchanalibus of 186 BC – was framed as if in response to a dire and unexpected national and religious emergency, and its execution was unprecedented in thoroughness, breadth and ferocity. Modern scholarship interprets this reaction as the senate's assertion of its own civil and religious authority throughout the Italian peninsula, following the recent Punic War and subsequent social and political instability. The cult was officially represented as the workings of a secret, illicit state within the Roman state, a conspiracy of priestesses and misfits, capable of anything. Bacchus himself was not the problem; like any deity, he had a right to cult. Rather than risk his divine offense, the Bacchanalia were not banned outright. They were made to submit to official regulation, under threat of ferocious penalties: some 6,000 persons are thought to have been put to death. The reformed Bacchic cults bore little resemblance to the crowded, ecstatic and uninhibited Bacchanalia: every cult meeting was restricted to five initiates and each could be held only with a praetor's consent. Similar attrition may have been imposed on Liber's cults; attempts to sever him from perceived or actual associations with the Bacchanalia seems clear from the official transference of the Liberalia ludi of 17 March to Ceres' Cerealia of 12–19 April. Once the ferocity of official clampdown eased off, the Liberalia games were officially restored, though probably in modified form. Illicit Bacchanals persisted covertly for many years, particularly in Southern Italy, their likely place of origin.

== Festivals, cults and priesthoods ==
Liber was closely, often interchangeably identified with Bacchus, Dionysus and their mythology but was not entirely subsumed by them; in the late Republican era, Cicero could insist on the "non-identity of Liber and Dionysus" and describe Liber and Libera as children of Ceres. Liber, like his Aventine companions, carried elements of his older cults into official Roman religion. He protected various aspects of agriculture and fertility, including the vine and the "soft seed" of its grapes, wine and wine vessels, and male fertility and virility. As his divine power was incarnate in the vine, grape and wine, he was offered the first, sacred pressing of the grape-harvest, known as sacrima.

The wine produced under Liber's patronage was his gift to humankind, and therefore fit for profane (non-religious) use: it could be mixed with old wine for the purposes of fermentation, and otherwise adulterated and diluted according to taste and circumstance. For religious purposes, it was ritually "impure" (vinum spurcum). Roman religious law required that the libations offered to the gods in their official cults should be vinum inferum, a strong wine of pure vintage, also known as temetum. It was made from the best of the crop, selected and pressed under the patronage of Rome's sovereign deity Jupiter and ritually purified by his flamen (senior priest). Liber's role in viniculture and wine-making was thus both complementary and subservient to Jupiter's.

Liber also personified male procreative power, which was ejaculated as the "soft seed" of human and animal semen. His temples held the image of a phallus; in Lavinium, this was the principal focus for his month-long festival, when according to St. Augustine, the "dishonourable member" was placed "on a little trolley" and taken in procession around the local crossroad shrines, then to the local forum for its crowning by an honourable matron. The rites ensured the growth of seeds and repelled any malicious enchantment (fascinatus) from fields.

Liber's festivals are timed to the springtime awakening and renewal of fertility in the agricultural cycle. In Rome, his annual Liberalia public festival was held on March 17. A portable shrine was carried through Rome's neighbourhoods (vici); Liber's aged, ivy-crowned priestesses (Sacerdos Liberi) offered honey cakes for sale, and offered sacrifice on behalf of those who bought them – the discovery of honey was credited to Liber-Bacchus. Embedded within Liberalia, more or less at a ritualistic level, were the various freedoms and rights attached to Roman ideas of virility as a divine and natural force. Young men celebrated their coming of age; they cut off and dedicated their first beards to their household Lares and if citizens, wore their first toga virilis, the "manly" toga – which Ovid, perhaps by way of poetic etymology, calls a toga libera (Liber's toga or "toga of freedom"). These new citizens registered their citizenship at the forum and were then free to vote, to leave their father's domus (household), choose a marriage partner and, thanks to Liber's endowment of virility, father their own children. Ovid also emphasises the less formal freedoms and rights of Liberalia. From his later place of exile, where he was sent for an unnamed offense against Augustus having to do with free speech, Ovid lamented the lost companionship of his fellow poets, who apparently saw the Liberalia as an opportunity for uninhibited talking.

== Imperial era ==
Augustus successfully courted the plebs, supported their patron deities and began the restoration of the Aventine Triad's temple; it was re-dedicated by his successor, Tiberius. Liber is found in some of the threefold, complementary deity-groupings of Imperial cult; a saviour figure, like Hercules and the Emperor himself. The reign and dynasty of the emperor Septimius Severus were inaugurated with games to honour Liber/Shadrafa and Hercules/Melqart, the Romanised founding hero-deities of his native town, Leptis Magna (North Africa). He built them a massive temple and arch in Rome. Later still, Liber Pater is of one of many deities served by the erudite, deeply religious senator Vettius Agorius Praetextatus (c. AD 315 – 384).

A Bacchic community shrine dedicated to Liber Pater was established in Cosa (in modern Tuscany), probably during the 4th century AD. It remained in use "apparently for decades after the edicts of Theodosius in 391 and 392 AD outlawing paganism". Its abandonment, or perhaps its destruction "by zealous Christians", was so abrupt that much of its cult paraphernalia survived virtually intact beneath the building's later collapse. Around the end of the 5th century, in Orosius's Seven Books of History Against the Pagans, Liber Pater's mythic conquest of India is taken as an historical event, which left a harmless, naturally peaceful nation "dripping with blood, full of corpses, and polluted with [Liber's] lusts."

== Temples and cult images ==
Pliny the Elder describes the Aventine Triad's temple as designed by Greek architects, and typically Greek in style; no trace remains of it, and the historical and epigraphical record offers only sparse details to suggest its exact location, but Pliny's description may be further evidence of time-honoured and persistent plebeian cultural connections with Magna Graecia, well into the Imperial era. Vitruvius recommends that Liber's temples follow an Ionic Greek model, as a "just measure between the severe manner of the Doric and the tenderness of the Corinthian," respectful of the deity's part-feminine characteristics.

== In literature ==
Gods named Liber and Libera play a major role in the 1999 science fiction/time-travel novel Household Gods by Harry Turtledove and Judith Tarr.

== Notes and references ==
=== Bibliography ===
- de Vaan, Michiel (2008). Etymological Dictionary of Latin and the other Italic Languages. Brill. ISBN 9789004167971.
