= Cures, Sabinum =

Ancient town in Italy

Coordinates: 42.1825°N 12.6866°E

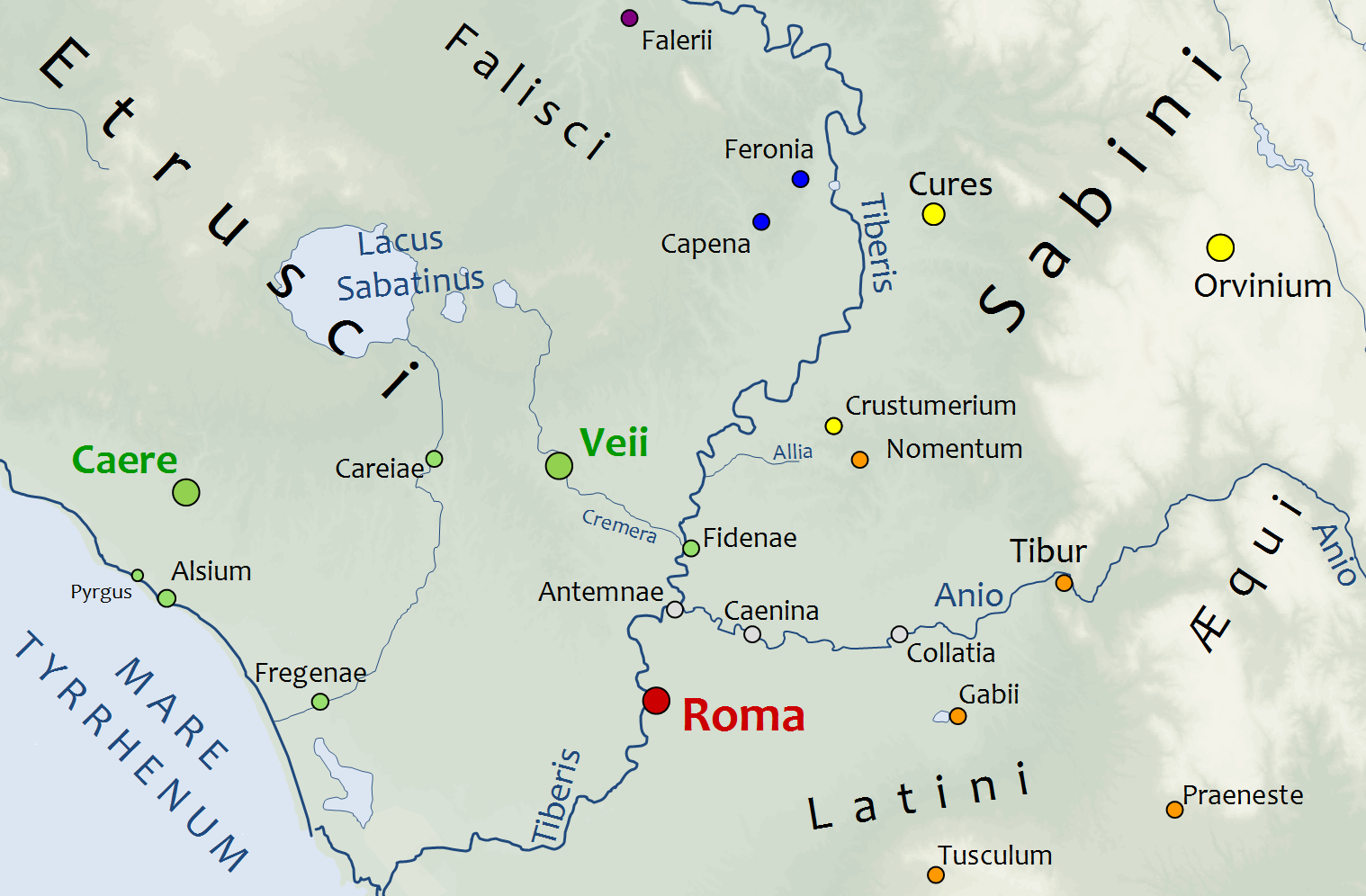
Rome and its Environs, showing the Latins, Sabines, and Etruscans. Cures appears at upper right center.

Cures was an ancient Sabine town in the Tiber Valley in central Italy, about 26 miles (42 km) from Rome, between the left bank of the Tiber and the Via Salaria. Its remains are located in the modern commune of Fara Sabina. According to legend, it was from Cures that Titus Tatius led to the Quirinal the Sabine settlers, from whom, after their union with the settlers on the Palatine, the whole Roman people took the name Quirites. Another legend, related by Dionysius, connects the foundation of Cures with the worship of the Sabine god Quirinus, whence Quirites.

It was also renowned as the birthplace of Ancient Rome's second king Numa Pompilius. According to Livy, Numa Pompilius resided in Cures immediately prior to his election as king.

Its importance among the Sabines at an early period is indicated by the fact that its territory is often called simply ager Sabinus. At the beginning of the imperial period, it is spoken of as an unimportant place, but seems to have risen to greater prosperity in the 2nd century. Pliny notices the Curenses as one of the municipal towns of the Sabines; and numerous inscriptions of Imperial date speak of its magistrates, its municipal senate (ordo), etc., whence we may infer that it continued to be a tolerably flourishing town as late as the 4th century. In these inscriptions it is uniformly termed Cures Sabini, an epithet probably indicating the claim set up by the people to be the metropolis of the Sabines. It appears as the seat of a bishop in the 5th century, after the establishment of Christianity. The bishops assumed the title of Curium Sabinorum, and sometimes even that of Episcopus Sabinensis. The town seems to have been destroyed by the Lombards in 589 AD. An epistle of Pope Gregory I states that in 593 the site was already desolate.

The site consists of a hill with two summits, round the base of which runs the Fosso Corese: the western summit was occupied by the necropolis, the eastern by the citadel, and the lower ground between the two by the city itself. Excavations from 1874 up until 1877 revealed a temple, forum, baths, etc.

== See also ==
- Tiber Valley

== Sources ==
- Thomas Ashby in Papers of the British School at Rome, iii. 34–35, 1906. (T. As.)
