= Quirites =

Term for Roman citizens in their peacetime functions

Quirites is the name of Roman citizens in their peacetime functions. Its use excluded military statute. During the mutiny of his legions in 47 BC, Julius Caesar expressed the dismissal of his army by addressing them as Quirites, implying his soldiers had been returned to civilian life.

== Etymology ==
Latin Quirītis most likely stems from an earlier *quiri-, although an etymology from *queri- cannot be excluded in view of the sporadic assimilation of *e to an i in the following syllable. Its original meaning remains uncertain. According to linguist Michiel de Vaan, since the quirīs and Quirīnus are connected with Sabellic immigrants into Rome in ancient legends, it may be a loanword. Ancient etymologies derived the term from the Sabine word for "spear", or from the Sabine capitol of Cures, after the Sabine people were assimilated early in Roman history.

The etymology *ko-wir-, then *co-uiri-um, 'assembly of the men', has been proposed by some scholars, although de Vaan notes that it "is not credible phonetically and not very compelling semantically".

Combined in the phrase populus Romanus quirites (or quiritium) it denoted the individual citizen as contrasted with the community. Hence ius quiritium in Roman law is full Roman citizenship. Subsequently, the term was applied (sometimes in a deprecatory sense, cf. Tac. Ann. ~. 42) to the Romans in domestic affairs, Romani being reserved for foreign affairs.

The English word cry comes from French crier, from Latin quirītāre, meaning 'to raise a plaintive cry, a public outcry'. According to Varro, it originally meant 'to implore the aid of the Quirītes or Roman citizens' (quiritare dicitur is qui Quiritum fidem clamans implorat).

== See also ==
- Quirinus
- Mars Quirinus
