= Fornacalia =

Ancient Roman festival

The Fornacalia was an Ancient Roman religious festival celebrated in honor of the goddess Fornax, a divine personification of the oven (fornax), and was related to the proper baking of bread.

== History ==
The Fornacalia may have been established by Numa Pompillius. Ovid wrote that "the oven was made a goddess, Fornax: the farmers, pleased with her, prayed she’d regulate the grain’s heat." It was held in early February on various dates in different curiae, which in the period of the Roman monarchy and the Roman Republic were the thirty wards of the city of Rome. It was proclaimed every year by the curio maximus, who was a priest who was the head of the curiae. He announced the different part which each curia (sing. of curiae) had to take in the celebration of the festival; "[n]ow the Curio Maximus, in a set form of words, declares the shifting date of the Fornacalia, the Feast of Ovens, and round the Forum hang many tablets, on which every ward displays its own sign."

== Beliefs and traditions ==
It is believed that every family in the curia brought far (spelt, a kind of grain), to be toasted in the meeting hall and sacrificed to ensure that bread in the household ovens wouldn’t be burnt in the following year. The last day of this festival was the quirinalia, which was also jokingly nicknamed the 'feast of fools'. All the curiae met together on that day for a collective feast. Those who did not know to what curia they belonged were able to participate in its rites; "[f]oolish people don’t know which is their ward, so they hold the feast on the last possible day. This tradition indicates that in later times membership of a curia (singular of curiae) had little significance to most Romans, so much so that some people did not know which curia they belonged to; the curiae included all citizens and that every Roman citizen was deemed to belong to a curia, even if he did not know which it was."

== Festival ==
The festival lasted approximately 13 days. The quirinalia started around the 17th of February and the fornacalia probably started on the nones or 5 February. The Fornacalia continued to be celebrated in the time of Lactantius.

== See also ==
- Roman festivals
