= Quirinus =

Roman deity

- God of the Roman state
- Member of the Archaic Triad
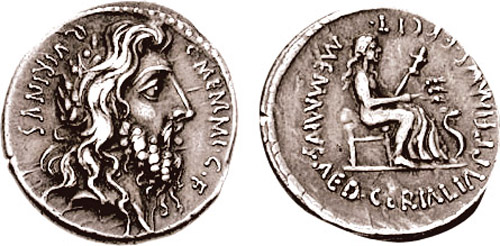
- Denarius picturing Quirinus on the obverse, and Ceres enthroned on the reverse, a commemoration by a moneyer in 56 BCE of a Cerealia presented by an earlier Gaius Memmius as aedile
- Other names: Curinus, Corinus, Querinus, Queirinus
- Major cult center: Quirinal Hill
- Abode: Quirinal Hill
- Symbols: beard, religious and military clothing
- Gender: male
- Festivals: Quirinalia
- Consort: Hersilia-Hora

In Roman mythology and religion, Quirinus (/kwɪˈraɪnəs/ kwi-RY-nəs, Latin: [kᶣɪˈriːnʊs]) is an early god of the Roman state. In Augustan Rome, Quirinus was also an epithet of Janus, Mars, and Jupiter.

== Name ==
=== Attestations ===
The name of god Quirinus is recorded across Roman sources as Curinus, Corinus, Querinus, Queirinus and QVIRINO, also as fragmented IOVI. CYRIN[O]. The name is also attested as a surname to Hercules as Hercules Quirinus.

=== Etymology ===
The name Quirīnus probably stems from Latin quirīs, the name of Roman citizens in their peacetime function. Since both quirīs and Quirīnus are connected with Sabellic immigrants into Rome in ancient legends, it may be a loanword. The meaning "wielder of the spear" (Sabine quiris, 'spear', cf. Janus Quirinus), or a derivation from the Sabine town of Cures, have been proposed by Ovid in his Fasti 2.477-480.

Some scholars have interpreted the name as a contraction of *co-viri-nus ("god of the assemblymen", cf. cūria < *co-viria), descending from an earlier *co-wironos, itself from the Proto-Indo-European noun *wihₓrós ("man"). Linguist Michiel de Vaan argues that this etymology "is not credible phonetically and not very compelling semantically".

== Depiction and worship ==
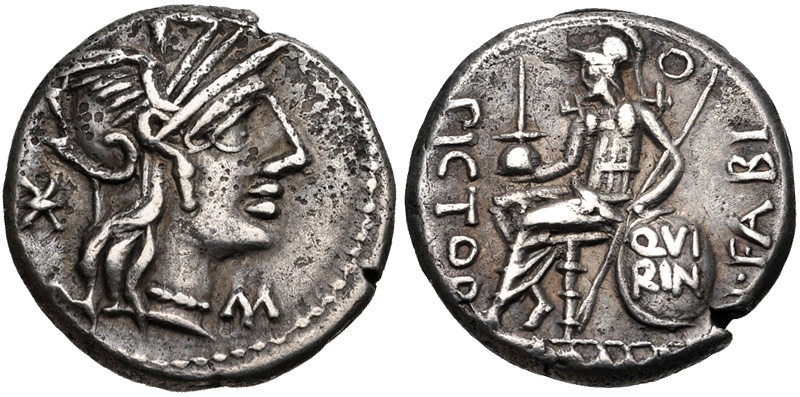
Denarius of 126 BCE; on the right is the flamen Quirinalis with QVIRIN on his shield.

In earlier Roman art, Quirinus was portrayed as a bearded man with religious and military clothing. However, he was almost never depicted in later Roman art due to the process of hellenisation. His main festival was the Quirinalia, held on February 17.

The priest of Quirinus, the Flamen Quirinalis, was one of the three patrician flamines maiores ("major flamens") who had precedence over the Pontifex Maximus.

== History ==
Quirinus most likely was originally a Sabine war god. The Sabines had a settlement near the eventual site of Rome, and erected an altar to Quirinus on the Collis Quirinalis, Quirinal Hill, one of the Seven hills of Rome. When the Romans settled in the area, the cult of Quirinus became part of their early belief system. This occurred before the later influences from classical Greek culture.

=== Deified Romulus ===
By the time of the poet Ennius in the 2nd century, Quirinus was considered the deified legendary first king, Romulus.

In his Life of Romulus, Plutarch wrote that, shortly after Rome's founder had disappeared under what some considered suspicious circumstances, a Roman noble named Proculus Julius reported that Romulus had come to him while he was travelling. He claimed that Romulus had instructed him to tell his countrymen that he, Romulus, was Quirinus. This story also likely dates to before the 1st century BC.

=== Brelich's argument for split deification ===
Historian Angelo Brelich argued that Quirinus and Romulus were originally the same divine entity which was split into a founder hero and a god when Roman religion became demythicised. To support this, he points to the association of both Romulus and Quirinus with the grain spelt, through the Fornacalia or Stultorum Feriae, according to Ovid's Fasti.

The last day of the festival is called the Quirinalia and corresponds with the traditional day of Romulus's death. On that day, the Romans would toast spelt as an offering to the goddess Fornax. In one version of the legend of Romulus's death cited by Plutarch, he was killed and cut into pieces by the nobles and each of them took a part of his body home and buried it on their land.

Brelich claimed this pattern – a festival involving a staple crop, a god, and a tale of a slain founding hero whose body parts are buried in the soil – is a recognized mytheme that arises when such a split takes place in a culture's mythology (see Dema deity archetype). The possible presence of the Flamen Quirinalis at the festival of Acca Larentia would corroborate this thesis, given the fact that Romulus is a stepson of hers, and one of the original twelve arval brethren (Fratres Arvales).

=== The Grabovian pantheon ===
The association of Quirinus and Romulus is further supported by a connection with Vofionos, the third god in the triad of the Grabovian gods of Iguvium. Vofionos would be the equivalent of Liber or Teutates, in Latium and among the Celts respectively.

=== The Capitoline Triad ===
His early importance led to Quirinus's inclusion in the Archaic Triad (the first Capitoline Triad), along with Mars (then an agriculture god) and Jupiter.

Over time, however, Quirinus became less significant, and he was absent from the later, more widely known triad (he and Mars had been replaced by Juno and Minerva). Varro mentions the Capitolium Vetus, an earlier cult site on the Quirinal, devoted to Jupiter, Juno, and Minerva, (Note: The Capitolium Vetus was demolished in 1625 by order of Pope Barberini.) among whom Martial makes a distinction between the "old Jupiter" and the "new".

=== Fade into obscurity ===
Eventually, Romans began to favor personal and mystical cults over the official state belief system. These included those of Bacchus, Cybele, and Isis, leaving only Quirinus's flamen to worship him.

=== Legacy ===
Even centuries after the fall of the Roman Empire, the Quirinal hill in Rome, originally named from the deified Romulus, was still associated with power. in 1583 Gregory XIII chose the site for his summer palace, this palace would come to be known as the Quirinal Palace. After the Capture of Rome, it was chosen as the seat of the Kingdom by the House of Savoy and later after the Abolition of the Monarchy it became the residence of the Presidents of the Italian Republic.

== See also ==
- Adolf Ellegard Jensen

== Bibliography ==
=== Modern sources ===
- Briquel, Dominique (1996). "Remarques sur le dieu Quirinus". Revue belge de Philologie et d'Histoire. 74 (1): 99–120. doi:10.3406/rbph.1996.4097.
- de Vaan, Michiel (2008). Etymological Dictionary of Latin and the other Italic Languages. Brill. ISBN 9789004167971.
- Dumézil, Georges (1966). Archaic Roman Religion: With an Appendix on the Religion of the Etruscans (1996 ed.). Johns Hopkins University Press. ISBN 978-0-8018-5482-8.
- Lajoye, Patrice (1 June 2010). "Quirinus, un ancien dieu tonnant ? Nouvelles hypothèses sur son étymologie et sa nature primitive". Revue de l'histoire des religions. 227 (227): 175–194. doi:10.4000/rhr.7573. JSTOR 23618183.
- Ogilvie, R M (1970). Commentary on Livy: Books 1–5 (Reprinted with addenda ed.). Oxford: Clarendon Press. ISBN 0-19-814432-6.

=== Ancient sources ===
- Livy (1905) [1st century AD]. Ab urbe condita [From the founding of the city]. Translated by Roberts, Canon – via Wikisource.
