= Fornax (mythology) =

Ancient Roman goddess

In ancient Roman religion, Fornax was the divine personification of the oven (fornax), the patroness of bakers, and a goddess of baking. She ensured that the heat of ovens did not get hot enough to burn the corn or bread. People would pray to Fornax for help whilst baking. Her festival, the Fornacalia, was celebrated on February 17 among the thirty curiae, the most ancient divisions of the city made by Romulus from the original three tribes of Rome. The Fornacalia was the second of two festivals involving the curiae, the other being the Fordicidia on April 19. The goddess was probably conceived of to explain the festival, which was instituted for toasting the spelt (Latin far) used to bake sacrificial cakes. Her role was eventually merged with the goddess Vesta.

== Ancient sources ==
- Ovid, Fasti II. 525 ff
- Festus, De significatu verborum, under Fornacalia, p. 82 in the edition of Lindsay
- Plutarch, Roman Questions 89

== See also ==
- Grain supply to the city of Rome
- Mola salsa
- Vestalia
