= Liberalia =

Roman religious festival celebrating Liber and Libera

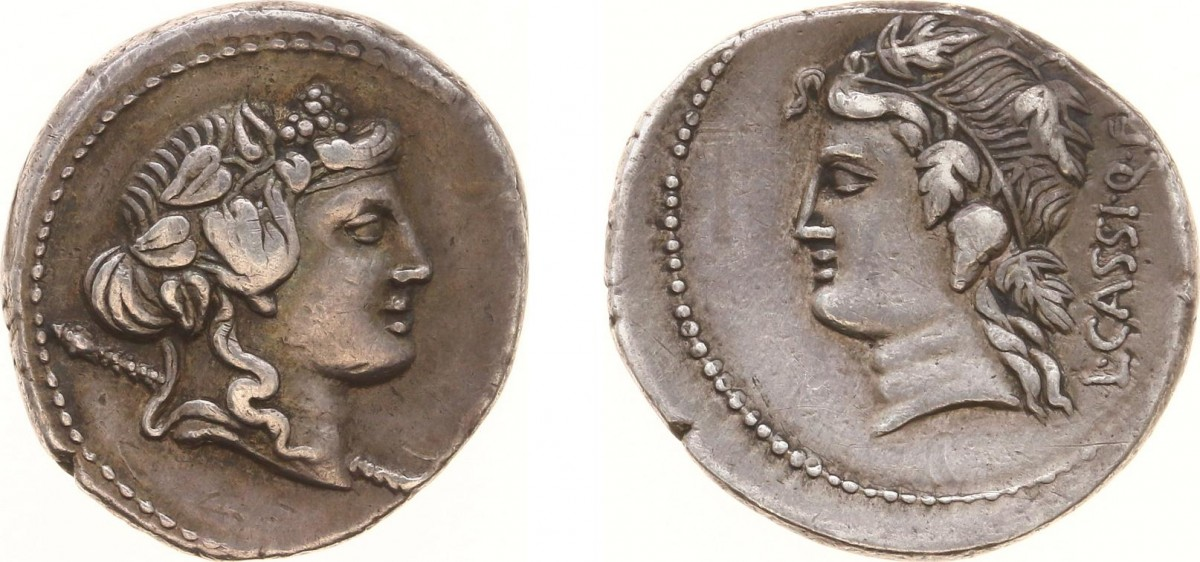
Denarius coin picturing Liber and Libera

In ancient Roman religion, the Liberalia (March 17) was the festival of Liber Pater and his consort Libera. The Romans celebrated Liberalia with sacrifices, processions, ribald and gauche songs, and masks which were hung on trees.

The feast celebrated the maturation of young boys to manhood. Roman boys, usually at age 15 or 16, would remove the bulla praetexta, a hollow charm of gold or leather, which parents placed about the necks of children to ward off evil spirits. At the Liberalia ceremony the young men might place the bulla on an altar (with a lock of hair or the stubble of a first shave placed inside) and dedicate it to the Lares, the gods of the household and family. Mothers often retrieved the discarded bulla and kept it out of superstition. If the son ever achieved a public triumph, the mother could display the bulla to ward off any evil that might be wished upon the son by envious people.

The celebration was meant to honor Liber Pater, an ancient god of fertility and wine (like Bacchus, the Roman version of the Greek god Dionysus). Liber Pater was also a vegetation god, responsible for protecting seed. Again like Dionysus, he had female priestesses, but Liber's were older women known as Sacerdos Liberi. Wearing wreaths of ivy, they made special cakes, or libia, of oil and honey which passing devotees would have them sacrifice on their behalf. Over time this feast evolved and included the goddess Libera, and the feast divided so that Liber governed the male seed and Libera the female. Ovid in his almanac entry for the festival identifies Libera as the celestial manifestation of Ariadne.

The ceremony was a "country" or rustic ceremony. The processional featured a large phallus which the devotees carried throughout the countryside to bring the blessing of fertility to the land and the people and protect the crops from evil. At the end of the procession, a virtuous and respected matron placed a wreath upon the phallus.

The Procession of the Argei, celebrated on March 16 and 17, was related to Liberalia. The Argei were 27 sacred shrines created by the Numina, very powerful gods without form or face, found throughout the regions of Rome. However, modern scholars have not discovered their meaning or use. In the Argei celebration, 30 figures also called Argei were fashioned from rushes into shapes resembling men; later in the year they were tossed into the river(s). The origin of this celebration is not certain, but many scholars feel that it may have been a ritualistic offering meant to appease and praise the Numa and that the 30 Argei probably represented the thirty elder Roman curiae, or possibly the 30 Latin townships. Other ancient scholars wrote that the use of the bulrush icons was meant to deter celebrants from human sacrifice, which was done to honor Saturn. Some historical documents indicate that the Argei (the sacred places) took their names from the chieftains who came with Hercules, the Argive, to Rome and then occupied the Capitoline (Saturnian) Hill. There is no way at present to verify this information, but it does coincide with the belief that Rome was founded by the Pelasgians and the name Argos is linked to that group.

While Liberalia is a relatively unknown event in modern times, references to Liberalia and the Roman goddess Libera are still found in astrology.

== See also ==
- Dionysia
