= Proserpina =

Ancient Roman goddess

- Queen of the Underworld, goddess of female and agricultural fertility, and springtime growth
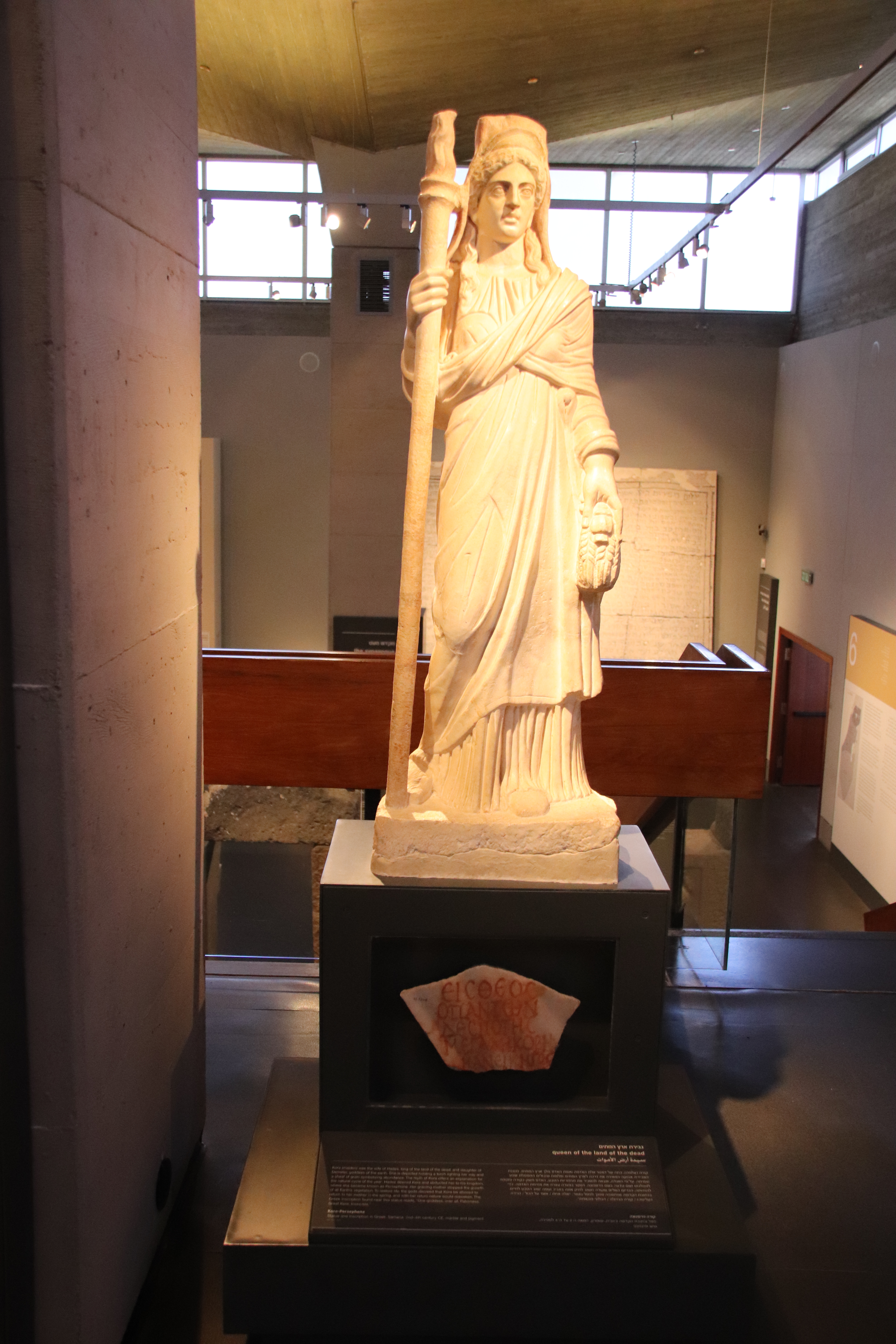
- Marble statue of Proserpina, 2nd century AD. She is depicted holding a torch lighting her way and a sheaf of grain symbolizing abundance.
- Abode: Underworld
- Symbol: torch, sheaf, pomegranate
- Temples: Aventine Hill (with Liber and Ceres)
- Festivals: Liberalia (uncertain)

Genealogy
- Parents: Ceres
- Siblings: Liber (various traditions)
- Consort: Pluto, Liber, Dis Pater or Orcus (various traditions)

Equivalents
- Greek: Persephone

Proserpina (/proʊˈsɜːrpɪnə/ proh-SUR-pih-nə; Latin: [proːˈsɛrpɪna]) or Proserpine (/ˈprɒsərpaɪn/ PROSS-ər-pyne) is an ancient Roman goddess whose iconography, functions and myths are virtually identical to those of the Greek Persephone. Proserpina replaced or was combined with the ancient Roman fertility goddess Libera, whose principal cult was housed in a temple atop Rome's Aventine Hill, which she shared with the grain-goddess Ceres and the wine god Liber (Liber Pater).

Each of these three deities occupied their own cella at the temple, their cults served or supervised by a male public priesthood. Ceres was by far the senior of the three, one of the Dii Consentes, Rome's approximate equivalent to the Greek Twelve Olympians, Ceres being identified with the Greek Demeter and Liber with Dionysus. Libera is sometimes described as a female version of Liber Pater, concerned with female fertility. Otherwise she is given no clear identity or mythology by Roman sources, and no Greek equivalent. Nothing is known of her native iconography: her name translates as a feminine form of Liber, "the free one". Proserpina's name is a Latinization of "Persephone", perhaps influenced by the Latin proserpere ("to emerge, to creep forth"), with reference to the growing of grain.

Proserpina was imported from southern Italy as part of an official religious strategy, towards the end of the Second Punic War, when antagonism between Rome's lower and upper social classes, crop failures and intermittent famine were thought to be signs of divine wrath, provoked by Roman impiety. The new cult was installed around 205 BC at Ceres' Aventine temple. Ethnically Greek priestesses were recruited to serve Ceres and Proserpina as "Mother and Maiden". This innovation might represent an attempt by Rome's ruling class to please the gods and the plebeian class; the latter shared strong cultural ties with Magna Graecia, the collection of Greek colonial settlements in southern Italy such were first established in the 8th century BC. The reformed cult was based on the Greek, women-only Thesmophoria, and was promoted as morally desirable for respectable Roman women, both as followers and priestesses. It was almost certainly supervised by Rome's Flamen Cerealis, a male priesthood usually reserved to plebeians. The new cult might have partly subsumed the Aventine temple's older, native cults to Ceres, Liber and Libera, but it also functioned alongside them. Liber played no part in the reformed cult. Ceres, Proserpina/Libera and Liber are known to have received cult in their own right, at their Aventine temple and elsewhere, though details are lacking.

The Roman cult of Mother and Maiden named Proserpina as queen of the underworld, spouse to Rome's king of the underworld, Dis Pater, and daughter to Ceres. The cult's functions, framework of myths and roles involved the agricultural cycle, seasonal death and rebirth, dutiful daughterhood and motherly care. They included secret initiations and nocturnal torchlit processions, and cult objects concealed from non-initiates. Proserpina's forcible abduction by the god of the underworld, her mother's search for her, and her eventual but temporary restoration to the world above are the subject of works in Roman and later art and literature. In particular, her seizure by the god of the Underworld – usually described as the Rape of Proserpina, or of Persephone – has offered dramatic subject matter for Renaissance and later sculptors and painters.

== Name ==
=== Etymology ===
Proserpina (Ancient Greek: Προσερπίνα or Προσερπίνη) is an Italic modification of Persephone itself (through metathesis of the form Πορσεφόνη, Porsephónē), perhaps influenced by the Latin word proserpere meaning "to creep forth".

=== Epithets and poetic allusions ===
- Iuno Averna (lit. 'Avernal Juno')
- Iuno inferna (lit. 'infernal Juno')
- Iuno Stygia (lit. 'Stygian Juno')

== Cult and myths ==
=== Origin of Libera ===
In early Roman religion, Libera was the female equivalent of Liber Pater, protector of plebeian rights, the god of wine, male fertility and liberty, equivalent to the Greek Dionysus. Libera was originally an Italic goddess, paired with Liber as an "etymological duality" at some time during Rome's Regal or very early Republican eras. She enters Roman history as part of a so-called Triadic cult alongside Ceres and Liber, in a temple established around 493 BC on the Aventine Hill at state expense, promised by Rome's governing class to the plebs (Rome's citizen-commoners), who had threatened secession. Collectively, these three deities were divine patrons and protectors of Rome's commoner-citizens, and guardians of Rome's senatorial records and written laws, housed at the temple soon after its foundation. Libera might have been offered cult on March 17 during Liber's festival, Liberalia, or at some time during the seven days of Cerealia, held in mid-to-late April; in the latter festival, she would have been subordinate to Ceres; the names of both Liber and Libera were a later addition to Ceres's festival. Otherwise, Libera's functional relationship to her Aventine cult partners is uncertain. She has no known native iconography or mythology.

=== Libera and Proserpina ===
Libera was officially identified as Proserpina from 205 BC, when she and Ceres acquired a Romanized form of Greek mystery rite, the ritus graecia cereris. This was part of Rome's religious recruitment of deities to serve as divine allies against Carthage, towards the end of the Second Punic War. In the late Republican era, Cicero described Liber and Libera as Ceres' children. At around the same time, Hyginus equated Libera with the Greek Ariadne. The older and newer forms of her names, cult, and rites, and their diverse associations, persisted well into the late Imperial era. St. Augustine (354–430 AD) wrote that Libera was a goddess of female fertility, just as Liber was a god of male fertility.

=== Proserpina ===
Proserpina was officially introduced to Rome as the daughter of Ceres in the newly Romanized cult of "Mother and Daughter". The cult's origins lay in southern Italy, which was politically allied to Rome but culturally a part of Magna Graecia. The cult was based on the women-only Greek Thesmophoria, which was a part public and part mystery cult to Demeter and Persephone as "Mother and Maiden". It arrived in Rome along with its Greek priestesses, who were granted Roman citizenship so that they could pray to the gods "with a foreign and external knowledge, but with a domestic and civil intention". In his commentary on Virgil, Servius writes that Proserpina's heavenly name is Luna, and her earthly name is Diana.

The exclusively female initiates and priestesses of the new "Greek-style" mysteries of Ceres and Proserpina were expected to uphold Rome's traditional, patrician-dominated social hierarchy and traditional morality. Unmarried girls were expected to emulate the chastity of Proserpina, the maiden; married women were expected to seek to emulate Ceres, the devoted and fruitful Mother. Their rites were intended to secure a good harvest, and increase the fertility of those who partook in the mysteries. Each of the Aventine triad's deities continued to receive cult in their own right. Liber's open, gender-mixed cult and festivals continued, though likely caught up in the suppression of the Bacchanalia some twenty years on. Proserpina's individual cult, and her joint cult with Ceres became widespread throughout the Republic and Empire. A Temple of Proserpina was located in a suburb of Melite, in modern Mtarfa, Malta. The temple's ruins were quarried away between the 17th and 18th centuries; only a few fragments survive.

=== Myths ===
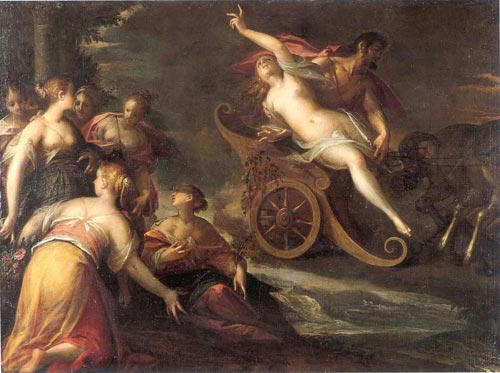
The Rape of Proserpina by Hans von Aachen (1587)

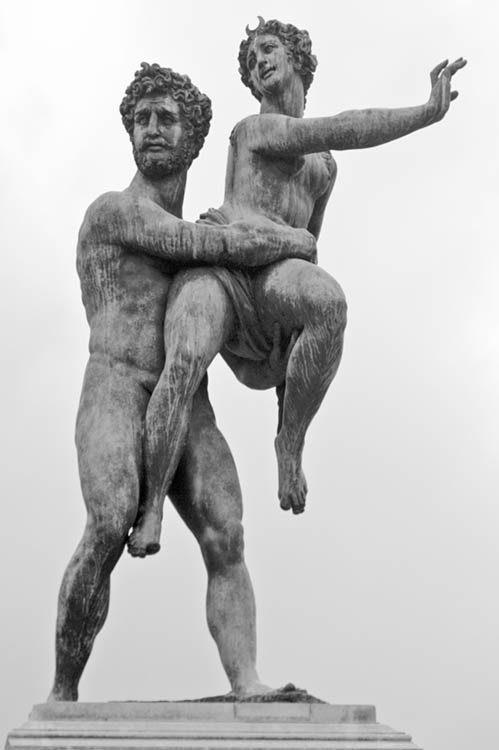
Copy of The Rape of Proserpina by Vincenzo de' Rossi, on view near Cliveden House

The best-known myth surrounding Proserpina is of her abduction by the god of the Underworld, her mother Ceres' frantic search for her, and her eventual but temporary restitution to the world above. In Latin literature, several versions are known, all similar in most respects to the myths of Persephone's abduction by Hades, named variously in Latin sources as Dis or Pluto. "Hades" can mean both the hidden Underworld and its king ('the hidden one'), who in early Greek versions of the myth is a dark, unsympathetic figure; Persephone is "Kore" ('the maiden'), taken against her will; in the Greek Eleusinian Mysteries, she and Hades form a divine couple who rule the underworld together, and receive Eleusinian initiates into some form of better afterlife. Renamed Pluto, the king of the underworld is distanced from his violent abduction of his consort. In 27 BC Vergil presented his own version of the myth in his Georgics. In the early 1st century AD, Ovid gives two poetic versions: one in Book 5 of his Metamorphoses and another in Book 4 of his Fasti. An early 5th-century AD Latin version of the same myth is Claudian's De raptu Proserpinae; in most cases, these Latin works identify Proserpina's underworld abductor and later consort as Dis.

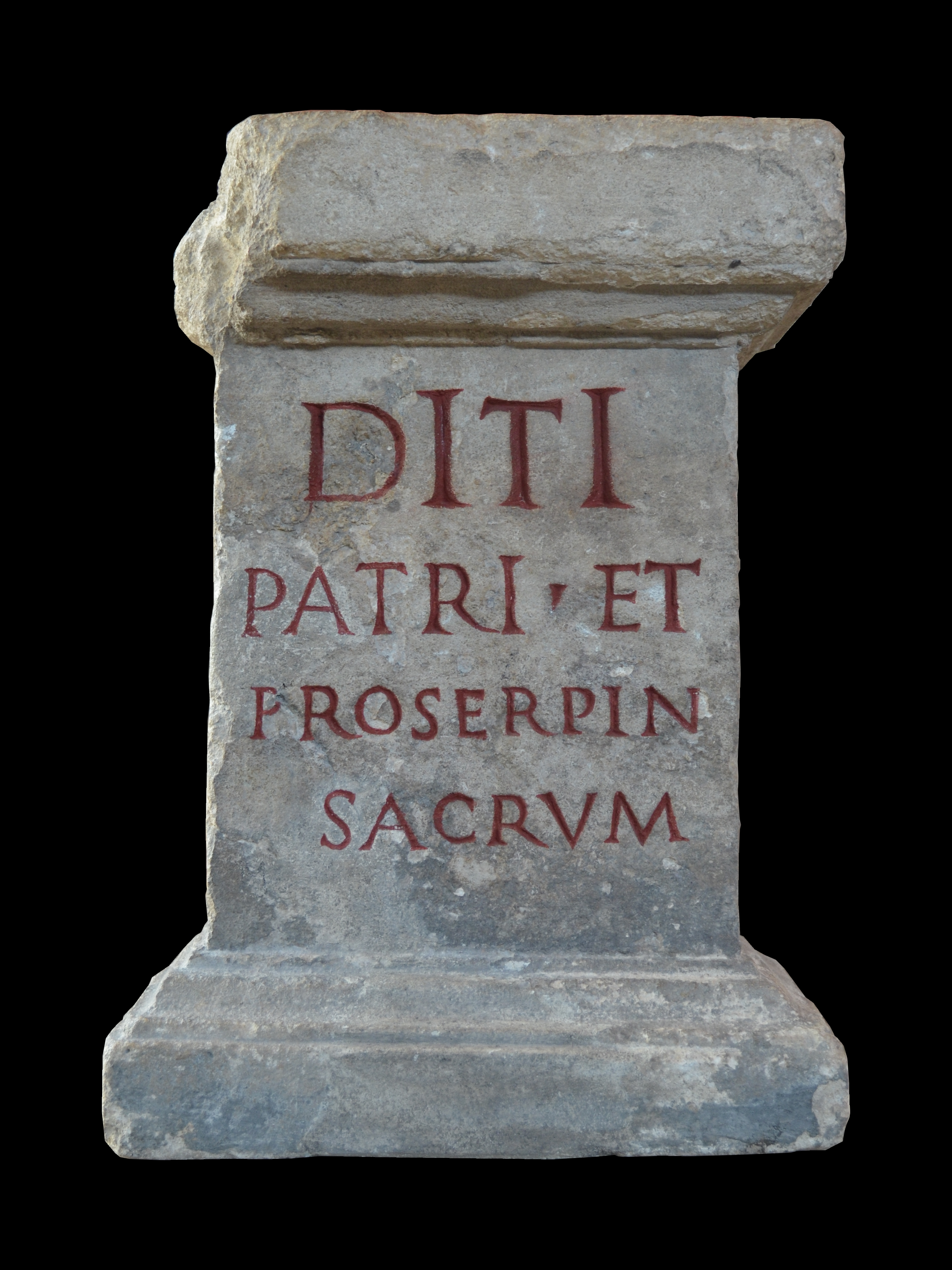
Votive pillar reading Diti Patri et Proserpin[ae] sacrum, "Holy to Dīs Pater and Proserpina", identifying Dīs Pater as Proserpina's husband

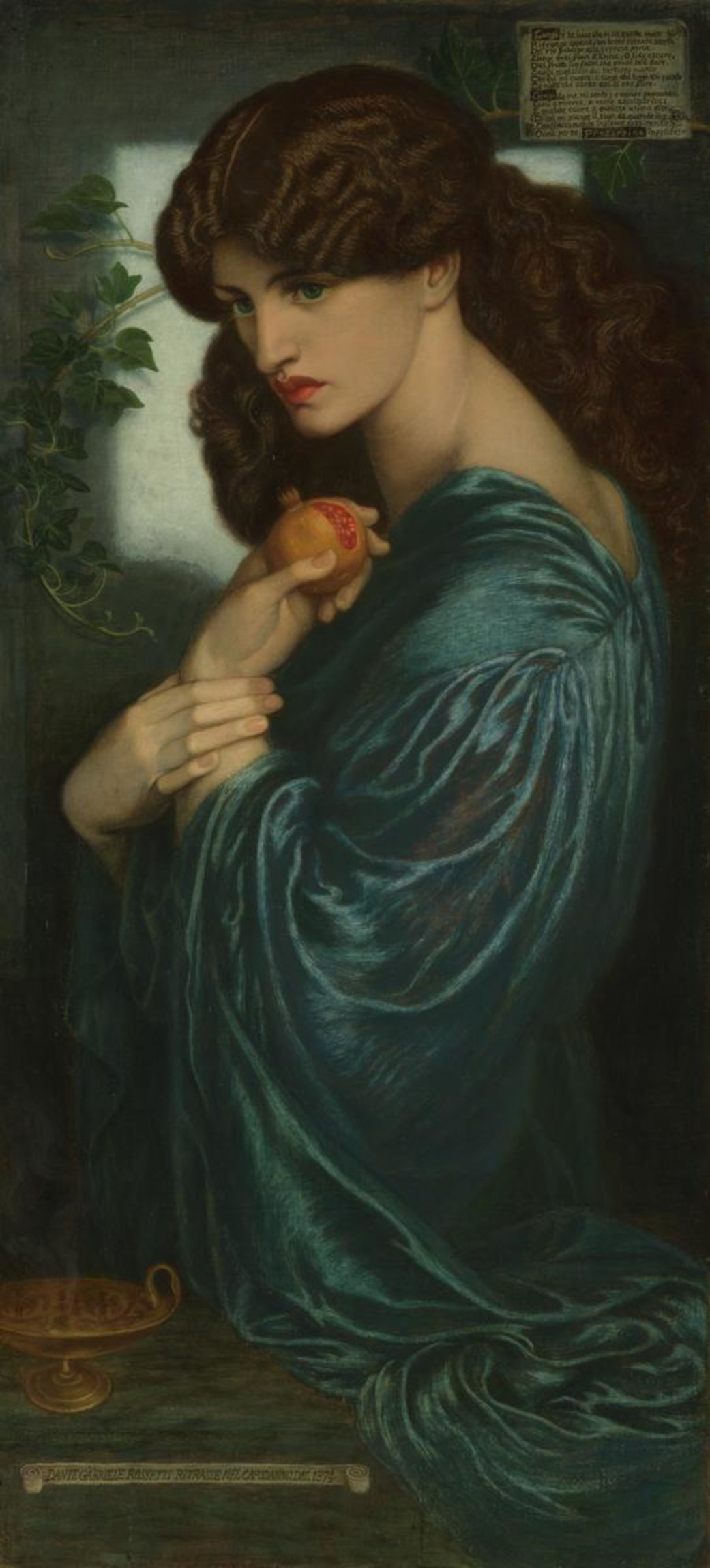
A Pre-Raphaelite Proserpine (1873–1877) by Dante Gabriel Rossetti (Tate Gallery, London)

In Claudian's version, the unprepossessing Dis yearns for the joys of married love and fatherhood, and threatens to make war on the other gods if he remains alone in Erebus. The Fates (Parcae), who determine the destinies of all, arrange a future marriage for Dis, to prevent the outbreak of war. Jupiter orders Venus to bring love to Dis, in fulfillment of the prophecy. Ceres has already sought to conceal the innocent Proserpina by sending her to safety in Sicily, Ceres' earthly home and sanctuary; but Dis comes out from the volcano at Mount Etna in his chariot, seizes Proserpina at the Pergusa Lake near Enna, and takes her down into the underworld. The poem ends at this point.

Proserpina's mother, Ceres, seeks her daughter across the world, but in vain. The sun sinks and darkness falls as Ceres walks the earth, stopping the growth of crops and creating a desert with each step. Jupiter sends Mercury to order Dis to free Proserpina; but Proserpina has melted Dis' hard heart, and eats "several" of the pomegranate seeds he offers her; those who have eaten the food of the dead cannot return to the world of the living. Pluto insists that she had willingly eaten his pomegranate seeds and in return she must stay with him for half the year. Virgil asserts that Proserpina agrees to this, and is reluctant to ascend from the underworld and re-unite with her mother. When Ceres greets her daughter's return to the world of the living, the crops grow, flowers blossom, and in summer all growing crops flourish, to be harvested in autumn. During the time that Proserpina resides with Pluto, the world goes through winter, when the earth yields no crops. The earth can only be fertile when she is above.

=== Orpheus and Eurydice ===
The most extensive myth of Proserpina in Latin is Claudian's (4th century AD). It is closely connected with that of Orpheus and Eurydice. In Virgil's Georgics, Orpheus' beloved wife, Eurydice, died from a snake-bite; Proserpina allowed Orpheus into Hades without losing his life; charmed by his music, she allowed him to lead his wife back to the land of the living, as long as he did not look back during the journey. But Orpheus could not resist a backward glance, so Eurydice was forever lost to him.

== In artwork ==
Proserpina has inspired many artistic compositions, including in sculpture (Bernini), in painting (Dante Gabriel Rossetti, a fresco by Pomarancio, Joseph Heintz the Elder, Rubens, Albrecht Dürer, Dell'Abbate, Maxfield Parrish, and in literature (Goethe's Proserpina and Swinburne's Hymn to Proserpine and The Garden of Proserpine). The statue often referred to as The Rape of Proserpina by Pluto that stands in the Großer Garten of Dresden, Germany, in fact depicts Boreas's abduction of Oreithyia, and is also referred to as Time Ravages Beauty. Kate McGarrigle's song about the legend was one of the last things she wrote prior to her death, and received its only performance at her last concert at Royal Albert Hall in December 2009.
