= Roman Kingdom =

Period of Roman history (c. 753 – c. 509 BC)

Roman Kingdom Roma (Latin)
- c. 753 – c. 509 BC
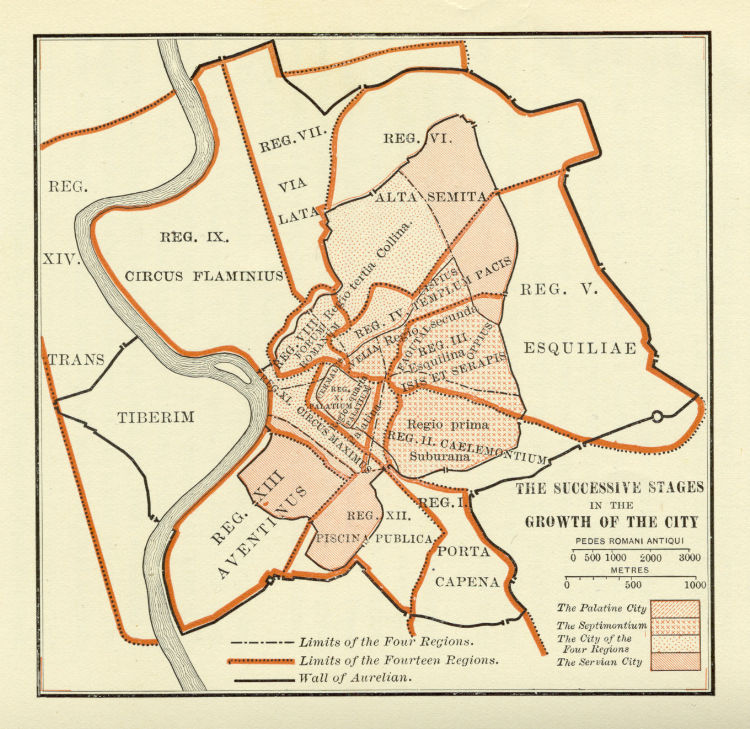
- The ancient quarters of Rome
- Capital: Rome
- Common languages: Old Latin
- Religion: Roman religion
- Demonym: Roman
- Government: Elective monarchy
- King
  - 753–716 BC: Romulus
  - 715–672 BC: Numa Pompilius
  - 672–640 BC: Tullus Hostilius
  - 640–616 BC: Ancus Marcius
  - 616–578 BC: L. Tarquinius Priscus
  - 578–534 BC: Servius Tullius
  - 534–509 BC: L. Tarquinius Superbus
- Legislature: Senate; Roman Assemblies
- Historical era: Iron Age
  - Founding of Rome: 753 BC
  - Monarchy overthrown: 509 BC
Preceded by
Latial culture
Alba Longa
Etruscan civilization
Succeeded by
Roman Republic
- Today part of: Italy; Vatican City

The Roman Kingdom, also known as the Roman monarchy and the regal period of ancient Rome, was the earliest period of Roman history, when the city and its territory were ruled by kings. According to tradition, the Roman Kingdom began with the city's founding c. 753 BC, with settlements around the Palatine Hill along the river Tiber in central Italy, and ended with the overthrow of the kings and the establishment of the Roman Republic c. 509 BC.

Little is certain about the kingdom's history as no records and few inscriptions from the time of the kings have survived. The accounts of this period written during the Republic and the Empire are thought largely to be based on oral tradition and debated as to their historicity.

== Origin ==
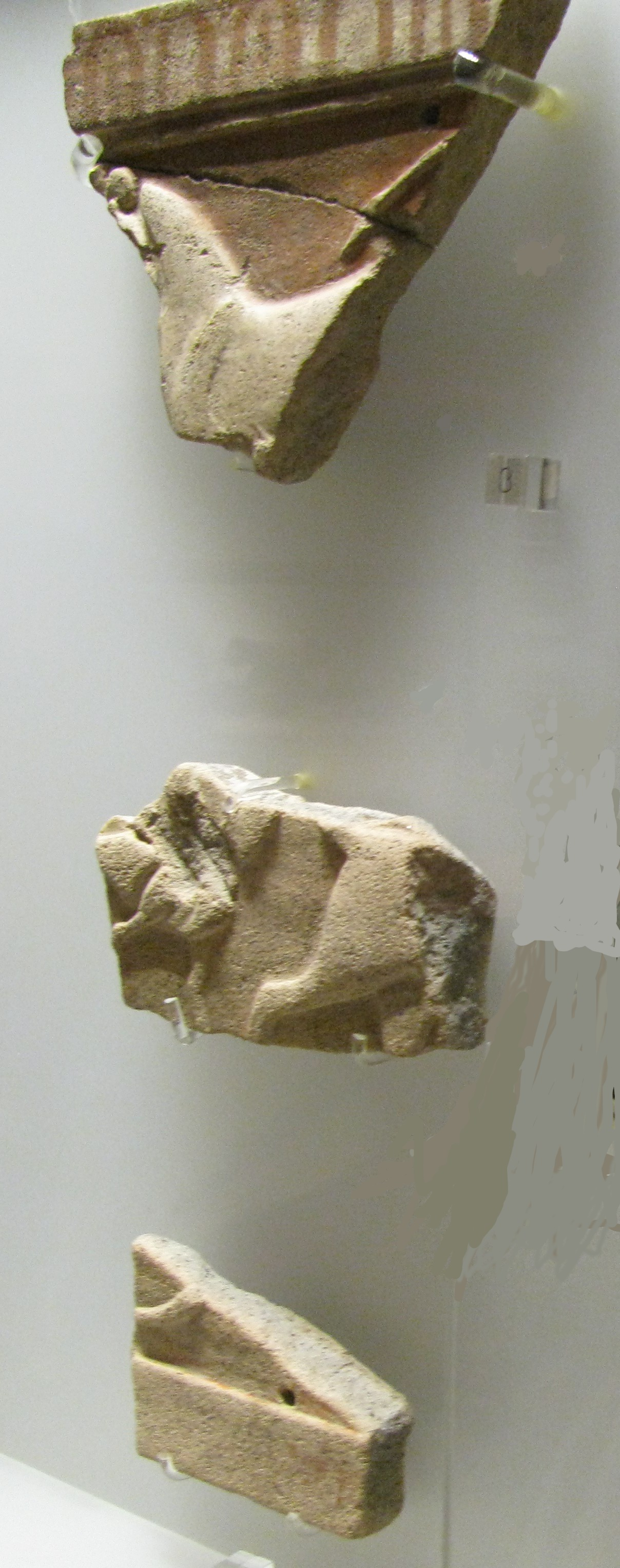
Shards of terracotta decorative plaques, sixth century BC (Roman Kingdom and Etruscan period), found in the Roman Forum, now in the Diocletian Baths Museum, Rome

The site of the founding of the Roman Kingdom (and eventual Republic and Empire) included a ford where one could cross the river Tiber in central Italy. The Palatine Hill and hills surrounding it provided easily defensible positions in the wide fertile plain surrounding them. Each of these features contributed to the success of the city.

The traditional version of Roman history, which has come down principally through Livy (59 BC – AD 17), Plutarch (before 50 – after AD 120), and Dionysius of Halicarnassus (c. 60 BC – after 7 BC), recounts that a series of seven kings ruled the settlement in Rome's first centuries. The traditional chronology, as codified by Varro (116 – 27 BC) and Fabius Pictor (c. 270 – c. 200 BC), allows 243 years for their combined reigns, an average of almost 35 years. Since the work of Barthold Georg Niebuhr, modern scholarship has generally discounted this schema. The Gauls destroyed many of Rome's historical records when they sacked the city after the Battle of the Allia in 390 BC (according to Varro; according to Polybius, the battle occurred in 387 or 386), and what remained eventually fell prey to time or to theft. With no contemporary records of the kingdom surviving, all accounts of the Roman kings must be carefully questioned.

== Monarchy ==
The kings following Romulus, the city's founder, were elected by the people of Rome to serve for life, and did not rely upon military force to gain or keep the throne. The only king to break fully with this tradition was Lucius Tarquinius Superbus, the final king, who according to tradition seized power from his predecessor and ruled as a tyrant.

In reality, most kings of Rome seem to have been leaders of armed bands who through persuasion or force acquired the support of the Roman aristocracy. The kings were not necessarily of Roman or Latin origin. Arnaldo Momigliano writes, "There was probably only a thin dividing line between the band chief called in to help an existing rex [king] and a band chief called in to replace him and therefore to rule in his stead."

The insignia of the kings of Rome were twelve lictors (attendants or servants) wielding the symbolic fasces bearing axes, the right to sit upon a curule seat, the purple toga picta, red shoes, and a white diadem around the head. Of all these insignia, the most important was the purple toga picta.

=== Chief Executive ===
The king was invested with supreme military, executive, and judicial authority through the use of imperium, formally granted to the king by the Curiate Assembly with the passing of the Lex curiata de imperio at the beginning of each king's reign. The imperium of the king was held for life and protected him from ever being brought to trial for his actions. As the king was the sole owner of imperium in Rome at the time, he possessed ultimate executive power and unchecked military authority as the commander-in-chief of all of the Roman legions. Also, the laws that kept citizens safe from magistrates' misuse of imperium did not exist during the monarchical period.

The king had the power to either appoint or nominate all officials to offices. He would appoint a tribunus celerum to serve as both the tribune of the Ramnes tribe in Rome and as the commander of the king's personal bodyguard, the celeres. The king was required to appoint the tribune upon entering office and the tribune left office upon the king's death. The tribune was second in rank to the king and also possessed the power to convene the Curiate Assembly and lay legislation before it.

Another officer appointed by the king was the praefectus urbi, who acted as the warden of the city. When the king was absent from the city, the prefect held all of the king's powers and abilities, even to the point of being bestowed with imperium while inside the city.

The king also received the right to be the only person to appoint patricians to the Senate.

=== Chief Priest ===
What is known for certain is that the king alone possessed the right to the augury on behalf of Rome as its chief augur, and no public business could be performed without the will of the gods made known through auspices. The people knew the king as a mediator between them and the gods (cf. Latin pontifex, "bridge-builder", in this sense, between men and the gods) and thus viewed the king with religious awe. This made the king the head of the national religion and its chief executive. Having the power to control the Roman calendar, he conducted all religious ceremonies and appointed lower religious offices and officers. It is said that Romulus himself instituted the augurs and was believed to have been the best augur of all. Likewise, King Numa Pompilius instituted the pontiffs and through them developed the foundations of the religious dogma of Rome.

=== Chief Legislator ===
Under the kings, the Senate and Curiate Assembly had very little power and authority. They were not independent since they lacked the right to meet together and discuss questions of state at their own will. They could be called together only by the king (and the tribune in the case of the Curiate Assembly) and could discuss only the matters that the king laid before them. While the Curiate Assembly had the power to pass laws that had been submitted by the king, the Senate was effectively an honorary council. It could advise the king on his action but by no means could prevent him from acting. The only thing that the king could not do without the approval of the Senate and the Curiate Assembly was to declare war against a foreign nation.

=== Chief Judge ===
The king's imperium both granted him military powers and qualified him to pronounce legal judgement in all cases as the chief justice of Rome. Though he could assign pontiffs to act as minor judges in some cases, he had supreme authority in all cases brought before him, both civil and criminal. This made the king supreme in times of both war and peace. While some writers believed there was no appeal from the king's decisions, others believed that a proposal for appeal could be brought before the king by any patrician during a meeting of the Curiate Assembly.

To assist the king, a council advised him during all trials, but this council had no power to control his decisions. Also, two criminal detectives (quaestores parricidi) were appointed by him as well as a two-man criminal court (duumviri perduellionis), which oversaw cases of treason. According to Livy, Lucius Tarquinius Superbus, the seventh and final king of Rome, judged capital criminal cases without the advice of counsellors, thereby creating fear amongst those who might think to oppose him.

=== Election of the kings ===
Whenever a king died, Rome entered a period of interregnum. Supreme power of the state would devolve to the Senate, which was responsible for finding a new king. The Senate would assemble and appoint one of its own members—the interrex—to serve for a period of five days with the sole purpose of nominating the next king of Rome. If no king were nominated at the end of five days, with the Senate's consent the interrex would appoint another Senator to succeed him for another five-day term. This process would continue until a new king was elected. Once the interrex found a suitable nominee to the kingship, he would bring the nominee before the Senate and the Curiate would review him. If the Senate passed the nominee, the interrex would convene the Curiate Assembly and preside over it during the election of the king. Once the nominee was proposed to the Curiate Assembly, the citizens of Rome could either accept or reject him. If accepted, the king-elect did not immediately enter office. Two other acts still had to take place before he was invested with the full regal authority and power.

First, it was necessary to obtain the divine will of the gods respecting his appointment by means of the auspices, since the king would serve as high priest of Rome. This ceremony was performed by an augur, who conducted the king-elect to the citadel, where he was placed on a stone seat as the people waited below. If found worthy of the kingship, the augur announced that the gods had given favourable tokens, thus confirming the king's priestly character. The second act which had to be performed was the conferral of the imperium upon the king. The Curiate Assembly's previous vote only determined who was to be king, and had not by that act bestowed the necessary power of the king upon him. Accordingly, the king himself proposed to the Curiate Assembly a law granting him imperium, and the Curiate Assembly by voting in favor of the law would grant it. In theory, the people of Rome elected their leader, but the Senate had most of the control over the process.

=== Senate ===
According to legend, Romulus established the Senate after he founded Rome by personally selecting the most noble men (wealthy men with legitimate wives and children) to serve as a council for the city. As such, the Senate was the King's advisory council as the Council of State. The Senate was composed of three hundred senators, with a hundred senators representing each of the three ancient tribes of Rome: the Ramnes, Tities, and Luceres. Within each tribe, a senator was selected from each of the tribe's ten curiae. The king had the sole authority to appoint the senators, but this selection was done in accordance with ancient custom.

Under the monarchy, the Senate possessed very little power and authority as the king held most of the political power of the state and could exercise those powers without the Senate's consent. The chief function of the Senate was to serve as the king's council and be his legislative coordinator. Once legislation proposed by the king passed the Curiate Assembly, the Senate could either veto it or accept it as law. The king was, by custom, to seek the advice of the Senate on major issues. However, it was left to him to decide what issues, if any, were brought before them and he was free to accept or reject their advice as he saw fit. Only the king possessed the power to convene the Senate, except during the interregnum, during which the Senate possessed the authority to convene itself.

== Kings of Rome ==
Years BC

Dates follow Livy's chronology of reign-lengths. Consult particular article for details of each king.

Year	King	Other notable information
753–716 BC	Romulus	Myth of Romulus and Remus; founder of Rome; established Roman Senate, army, first religious institutions.
715–672 BC	Numa Pompilius	Established many of Rome's most important religious and political institutions; introduced twelve-month solar calendar.
672–640 BC	Tullus Hostilius	Defeated and destroyed Alba Longa; integrated the noble Alban families into the Roman aristocracy.
640–616 BC	Ancus Marcius	Established port of Ostia; defeated the Sabines.
616–578 BC	Tarquinius Priscus	Expanded Roman hegemony over Latium; doubled membership in the Senate to 200; drained the Roman Forum, and constructed the Cloaca Maxima and the Circus Maximus.
578–534 BC	Servius Tullius	Established the Servian Tribes and the centuries; built the Temple of Diana and a new wall around the city; instituted the Compitalia.
534–509 BC	Tarquinius Superbus	Last King of Rome; overthrew Servius; conquered various Latin cities and established colonies; built the Temple of Jupiter Optimus Maximus; deposed and Roman Republic established.

=== Romulus ===
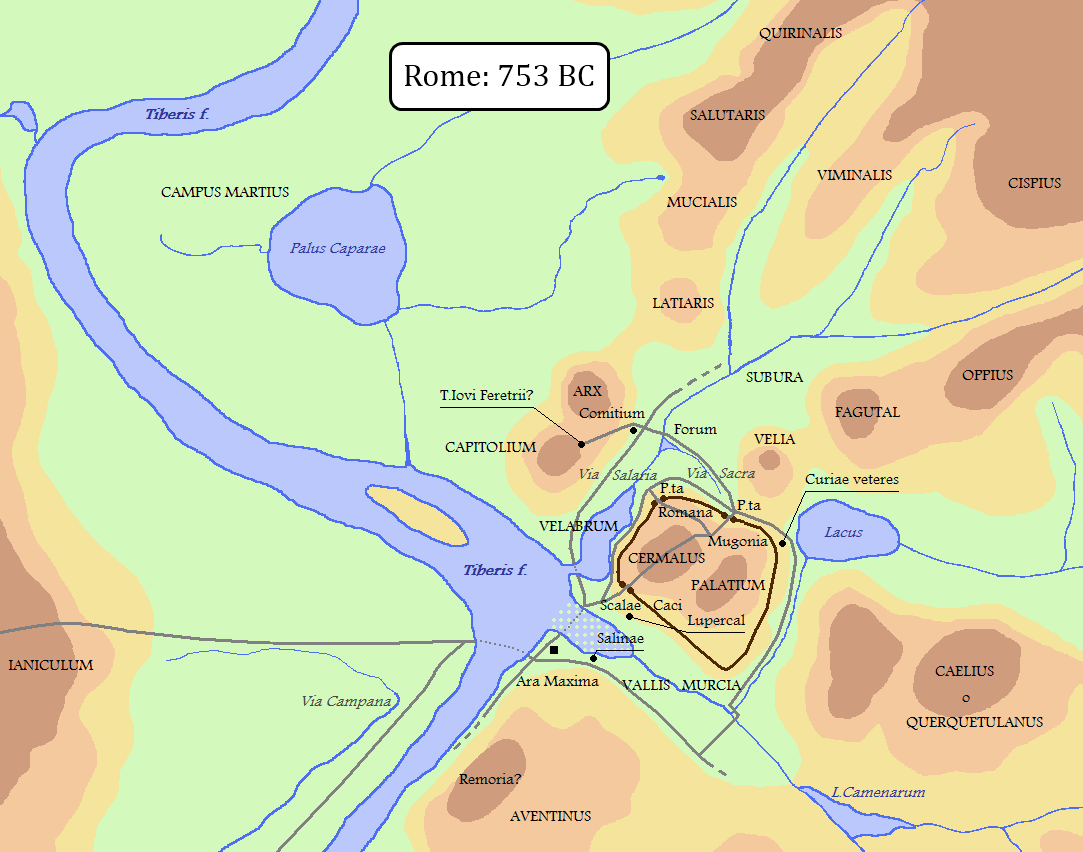
A map of Rome in 753 BC. Colours show topography, with green lowlands and brown highlands. The Latin names of hills are included in all caps.

Son of the Vestal Virgin Rhea Silvia, ostensibly by the god Mars, the legendary Romulus was Rome's founder and first king. After he and his twin brother Remus had deposed King Amulius of Alba and reinstated the king's brother and their grandfather Numitor to the throne, they decided to build a city in the area where they had been abandoned as infants. After killing Remus in a dispute, Romulus began building the city on the Palatine Hill. His work began with fortifications. He permitted men of all classes to come to Rome as citizens, including slaves and freemen without distinction. He is credited with establishing the city's religious, legal and political institutions. The kingdom was established by unanimous acclaim with him at the helm when Romulus called the citizenry to a council for the purposes of determining their government.

Romulus established the Senate as an advisory council with the appointment of 100 of the most noble men in the community. These men he called patres (from pater, father, head), and their descendants became the patricians. To project command, he surrounded himself with attendants, in particular the twelve lictors. He created three divisions of horsemen (equites), called centuries: Ramnes (Romans), Tities (after the Sabine king) and Luceres (Etruscans). He also divided the populace into 30 curiae, named after 30 of the Sabine women who had intervened to end the war between Romulus and Tatius. The curiae formed the voting units in the popular assemblies (Comitia Curiata).

Romulus was behind one of the most notorious acts in Roman history, the incident commonly known as The Rape of the Sabine Women. To provide his citizens with wives, Romulus invited the neighbouring tribes to a festival in Rome where the Romans committed a mass abduction of young women from among the attendees. The accounts vary from 30 to 683 women taken, a significant number for a population of 3,000 Latins (and presumably for the Sabines as well). War broke out when Romulus refused to return the captives. After the Sabines made three unsuccessful attempts to invade the hill settlements of Rome, the women themselves intervened during the Battle of the Lacus Curtius to end the war. The two peoples were united in a joint kingdom, with Romulus and the Sabine king Titus Tatius sharing the throne. In addition to the war with the Sabines, Romulus waged war with the Fidenates and Veientes and others.

He reigned for thirty-seven years. According to the legend, Romulus vanished at age fifty-four while reviewing his troops on the Campus Martius. He was reported to have been taken up to Mount Olympus in a whirlwind and made a god. After initial acceptance by the public, rumours and suspicions of foul play by the patricians began to grow. In particular, some thought that members of the nobility had murdered him, dismembered his body, and buried the pieces on their land. These were set aside after an esteemed nobleman testified that Romulus had come to him in a vision and told him that he was the god Quirinus. He became not only one of the three major gods of Rome, but the very likeness of the city itself.

A replica of Romulus's hut was maintained in the centre of Rome until the end of the Roman Empire.

=== Numa Pompilius ===
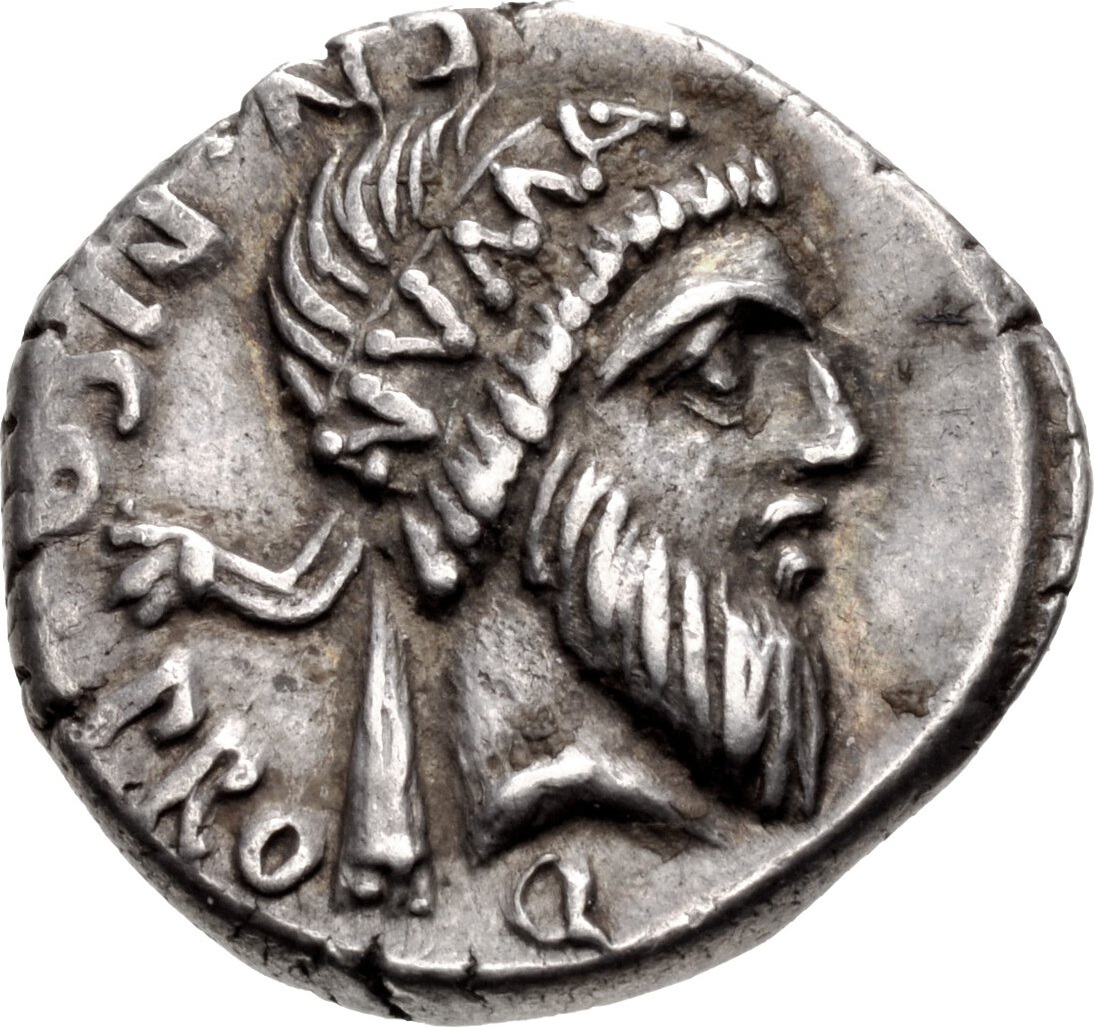
Numa depicted on a 48 BC denarius

After Romulus died, there was an interregnum for one year, during which ten men chosen from the Senate governed Rome as successive interreges. Under popular pressure, the Senate finally chose the Sabine Numa Pompilius to succeed Romulus, on account of his reputation for justice and piety. The choice was accepted by the Curiate Assembly.

Numa's reign was marked by peace and religious reform. He constructed a new temple to Janus and, after establishing peace with Rome's neighbours, closed the doors of the temple to indicate a state of peace. They remained closed for the rest of his reign. He established the Vestal Virgins at Rome, as well as the Salii, and the flamines for Jupiter, Mars and Quirinus. He also established the office and duties of pontifex maximus. Numa reigned for 43 years. He reformed the Roman calendar by adjusting it for the solar and lunar year, as well as by adding the months of January and February to bring the total number of months to twelve.

=== Tullus Hostilius ===
Tullus Hostilius was as warlike as Romulus had been, completely unlike Numa as he lacked any respect for the gods. Tullus waged war against Alba Longa, Fidenae and Veii and the Sabines. During Tullus's reign, the city of Alba Longa was completely destroyed and Tullus integrated its population into Rome. Tullus is attributed with constructing a new home for the Senate, the Curia Hostilia, which survived for 562 years after his death.

According to Livy, Tullus neglected the worship of the gods until, towards the end of his reign, he fell ill and became superstitious. However, when Tullus called upon Jupiter and begged assistance, Jupiter responded with a bolt of lightning that burned the king and his house to ashes. His reign lasted for 32 years.

=== Ancus Marcius ===
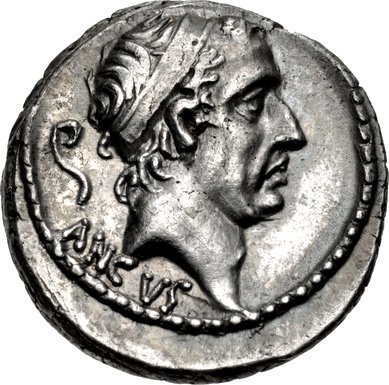
Ancus Marcius depicted on a 57 BC denarius

Following the mysterious death of Tullus, the Romans elected a peaceful and religious king in his place, Numa's grandson, Ancus Marcius. Much like his grandfather, Ancus did little to expand the borders of Rome and only fought wars to defend the territory. He also built Rome's first prison on the Capitoline Hill.

Ancus further fortified the Janiculum Hill on the western bank, and built the first bridge across the Tiber River. He also founded the port of Ostia Antica on the Tyrrhenian Sea and established Rome's first salt works, as well as the city's first aqueduct. Rome grew, as Ancus used diplomacy to peacefully unite smaller surrounding cities into alliance with Rome. He completed the conquest of the Latins and relocated them to the Aventine Hill, thus forming the plebeian class of Romans.

He died a natural death, like his grandfather, after 25 years as king, marking the end of Rome's Latin–Sabine kings.

=== Lucius Tarquinius Priscus ===
Lucius Tarquinius Priscus was the fifth king of Rome and the first of Etruscan birth. After immigrating to Rome, he gained favour with Ancus, who later adopted him as son. Upon ascending the throne, he waged wars against the Sabines and Etruscans, doubling the size of Rome and bringing great treasures to the city. To accommodate the influx of population, the Aventine and Caelian hills were populated.

One of his first reforms was to add 100 new members to the Senate from the conquered Etruscan tribes, bringing the total number of senators to 200. He used the treasures Rome had acquired from the conquests to build great monuments for Rome. Among these were Rome's great sewer systems, the Cloaca Maxima, which he used to drain the swamp-like area between the Seven Hills of Rome. In its place, he began construction on the Roman Forum. He also founded the Roman games.

Priscus initiated great building projects, including the city's first bridge, the Pons Sublicius. The most famous is the Circus Maximus, a giant stadium for chariot races. After that, he started the building of the temple-fortress to the god Jupiter on the Capitoline Hill. However, before it was completed, he was killed by a son of Ancus Marcius, after 38 years as king. His reign is best remembered for introducing the Roman symbols of military and civil offices, and the Roman triumph, being the first Roman to celebrate one.

=== Servius Tullius ===
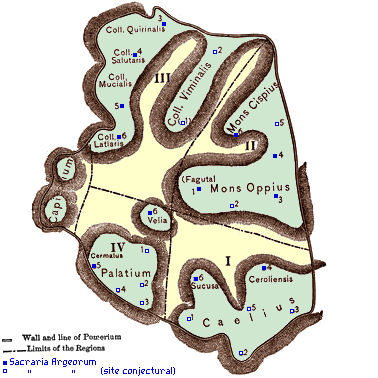
A map of the City of the Four Regions, roughly corresponding to the city limits during the later kingdom. The division is traditionally, though probably incorrectly, attributed to Servius Tullius. The seven hills of Rome are shown in green, with Latin names.

Priscus was succeeded by his son-in-law Servius Tullius, Rome's second king of Etruscan birth, and the son of a slave. Like his father-in-law, Servius fought successful wars against the Etruscans. He used the booty to build the first wall all around the Seven Hills of Rome, the pomerium. He also reorganized the army.

Servius Tullius instituted a new constitution, further developing the citizen classes. He instituted Rome's first census, which divided the population into five economic classes, and formed the Centuriate Assembly. He used the census to divide the population into four urban tribes based on location, thus establishing the Tribal Assembly. He also oversaw the construction of the Temple of Diana on the Aventine Hill.

Servius' reforms made a big change in Roman life: voting rights based on socio-economic status, favouring elites. However, over time, Servius increasingly favoured the poor in order to gain support from plebeians, often at the expense of patricians. After a 44-year reign, Servius was killed in a conspiracy by his daughter Tullia and her husband Lucius Tarquinius Superbus.

In the first century AD, the emperor Claudius mentioned Mastarna, an Etruscan adventurer who became king of Rome after the death of his chief Caelius Vibenna; Claudius identified Mastarna with Servius Tullius. Mastarna and Caelius Vibenna are also depicted on the François Tomb, a painted tomb with Etruscan inscriptions usually dated to the fourth or third century BC. Mastarna—whose name appears to be the Etruscan form of the Latin title magister 'leader'—may have become king of Rome in the time of the Tarquinii. Momigliano writes that Mastarna "is so different from the traditional Servius Tullius that it appears prudent to keep the two apart."

=== Lucius Tarquinius Superbus ===
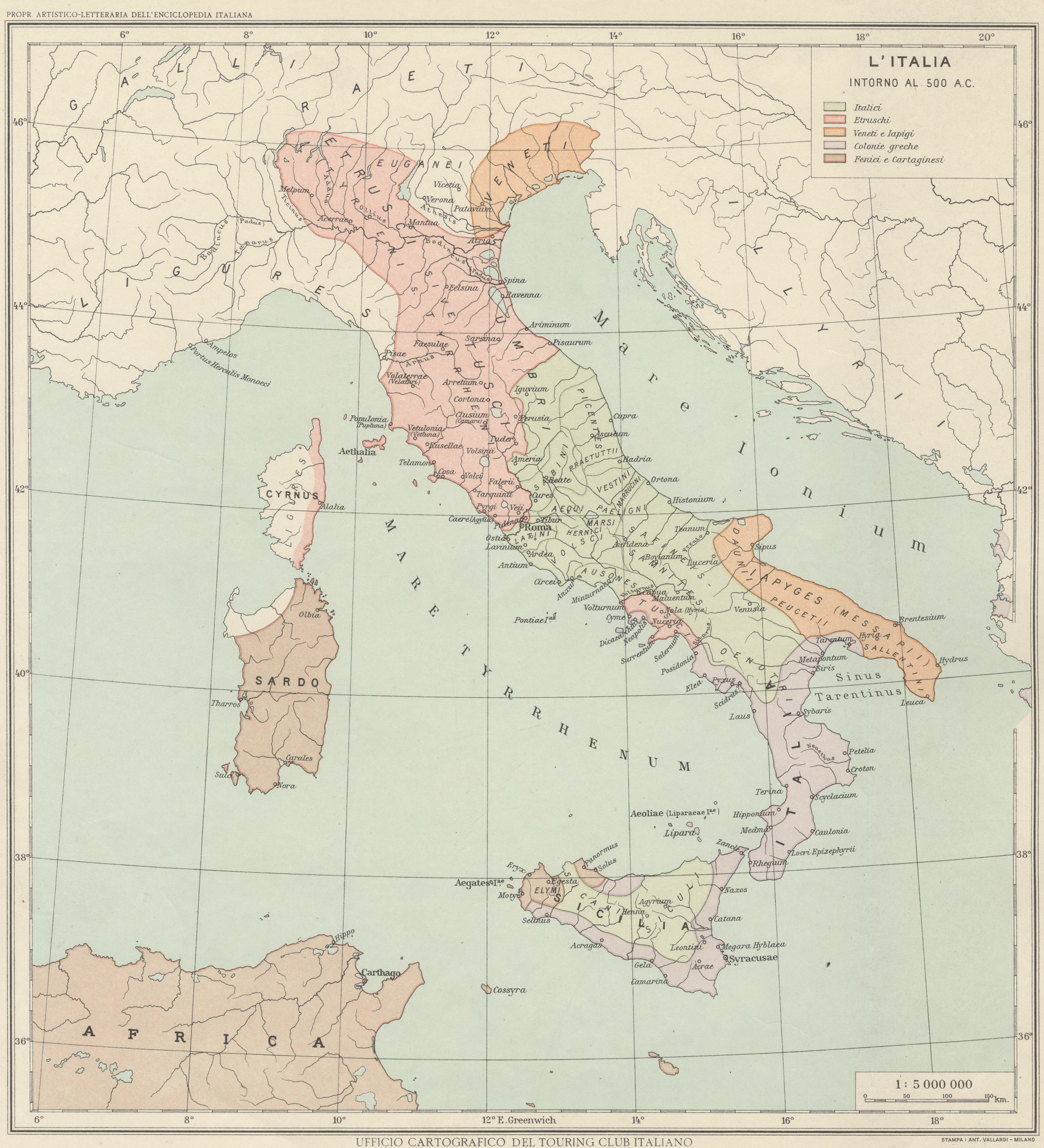
Map of Italy around 500 BC

The seventh and final king of Rome was Lucius Tarquinius Superbus. He was the son of Priscus and the son-in-law of Servius, whom he and his wife had killed. He ruled for 25 years.

Tarquinius waged a number of wars against Rome's neighbours, including against the Volsci, Gabii and the Rutuli. He also secured Rome's position as head of the Latin cities. He also engaged in a series of public works, notably the completion of the Temple of Jupiter Optimus Maximus, and works on the Cloaca Maxima and the Circus Maximus. However, Tarquin's reign is remembered for his use of violence and intimidation to control Rome and his disrespect for Roman custom and the Roman Senate.

Tensions came to a head when the king's son, Sextus Tarquinius, raped Lucretia, wife and daughter to powerful Roman nobles. Lucretia told her relatives about the attack, and committed suicide to avoid the dishonour of the episode. Four men, led by Lucius Junius Brutus, and including Lucius Tarquinius Collatinus, Publius Valerius Poplicola, and Spurius Lucretius Tricipitinus incited a revolution that deposed and expelled Tarquinius and his family from Rome in 509 BC. Lucius Junius Brutus and Lucius Tarquinius Collatinus became Rome's first consuls, marking the beginning of the Roman Republic. An attempt by the Etruscan ruler Lars Porsena to restore the Tarquinii to power was abandoned, and a subsequent attack by Porsena's son on Aricia was beaten back by the Latins and their allies from Cumae.

In the first century AD, the Roman historians Tacitus and Pliny recorded an alternative tradition, according to which Porsena had actually captured Rome and imposed humiliating conditions on the Romans. Thus, some modern scholars have suggested that Porsena took Rome and from there attacked Aricia, withdrawing after his defeat. According to Tim Cornell, rather than trying to restore the Tarquinii at all, it is more likely that Porsena abolished the Roman monarchy, and that the republic was established after his departure. Momigliano writes that, if Porsena did in fact take Rome, he must have installed a new Etruscan ruler there, and the Romans probably did not elect their first consuls until after the defeat of Porsena by the other Latins and the Cumaeans.

== Gallery ==
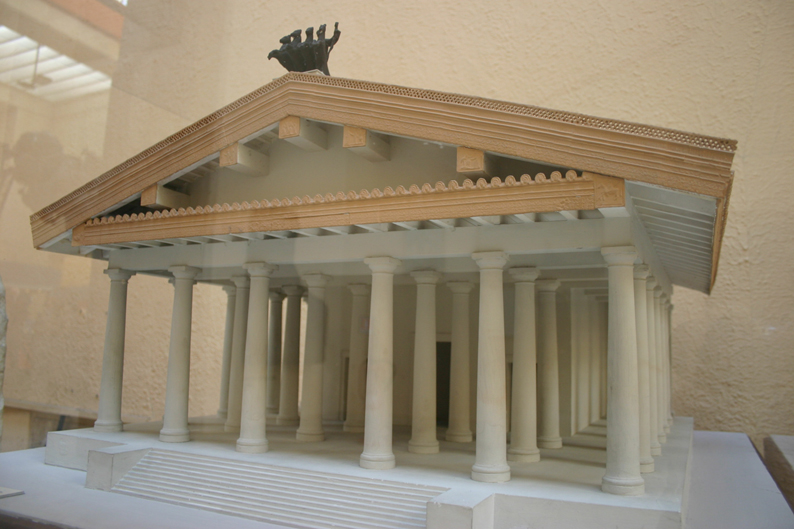
Model of the Temple of Jupiter Optimus Maximus, 509 BC

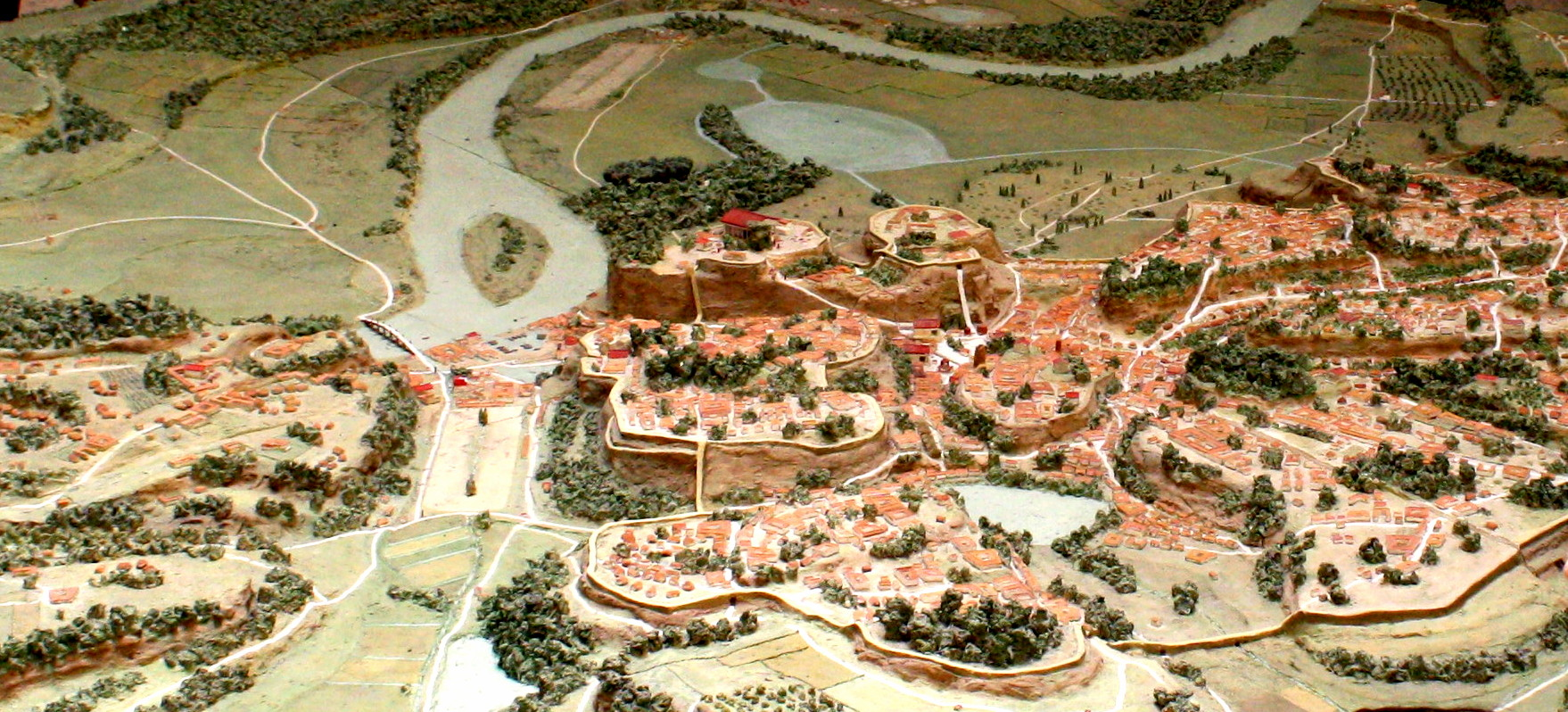
Model of Archaic Rome, c. 509 BC

== See also ==
- Tarquinian conspiracy

== Sources ==
- Abbott, Frank Frost (2001) [1901]. A History and Description of Roman Political Institutions. Elibron Classics. ISBN 0-543-92749-0.
- Cornell, Tim (7 March 2016). "Porsen(n)a, Lars". Oxford Classical Dictionary (Online ed.). doi:10.1093/acrefore/9780199381135.013.5260. ISBN 978-0-19-938113-5.
- Everitt, Anthony (2012). The Rise of Rome: The Making of the World's Greatest Empire (1st ed.). New York: Random House. ISBN 978-1-4000-6663-6.
- Golden, Gregory K (2013). Crisis Management During the Roman Republic. Cambridge University Press. ISBN 978-1-107-05590-2. OCLC 842919750.
- Hornblower, Simon; et al., eds. (2012). The Oxford Classical Dictionary (4th ed.). Oxford University Press. ISBN 978-0-19-954556-8. OCLC 959667246.
  - Momigliano, Arnaldo; Lintott, Andrew. "senatus consultum ultimum". In OCD^{4} (2012).
- Lintott, Andrew (1999a). The Constitution of the Roman Republic. Oxford University Press. ISBN 978-0-19-926108-6.
- Livy, Ab Urbe Condita.
- Matyszak, Philip (2003). Chronicle of the Roman Republic: The Rulers of Ancient Rome from Romulus to Augustus. New York: Thames & Hudson. ISBN 978-0-500-05121-4.
- Momigliano, Arnaldo; Cornell, Tim (7 March 2016). "Senate, regal and republican period". Oxford Classical Dictionary (Online ed.). doi:10.1093/acrefore/9780199381135.013.5818. ISBN 978-0-19-938113-5.
- Momigliano, Arnaldo (1989). "The Origins of Rome". In Walbank, F. W.; et al. (eds.). The Cambridge Ancient History. Vol. 7, Part 2 (2nd ed.). Cambridge University Press. pp. 52–112. ISBN 0-521-23446-8.
- Taylor, Lily Ross (1966). Roman Voting Assemblies: From the Hannibalic War to the Dictatorship of Caesar. The University of Michigan Press. ISBN 978-0-472-08125-7.
