= Sextilis =

Original sixth month in the Roman calendar

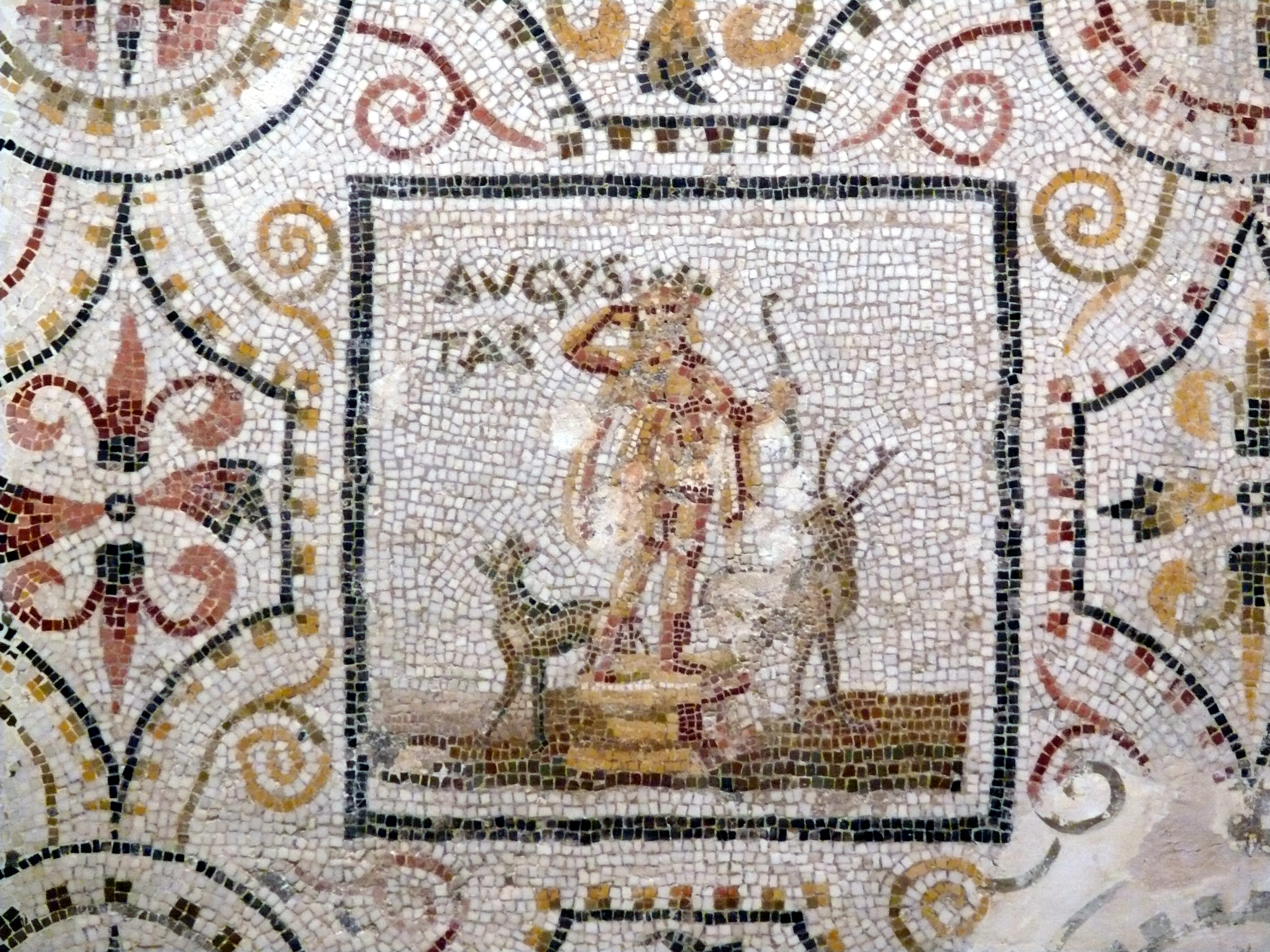
August panel from a Roman mosaic of the months (from El Djem, Tunisia, first half of 3rd century AD)

Sextilis (lit. 'sixth') or mensis Sextilis was the Latin name for what was originally the sixth month in the Roman calendar, when March (Martius, "Mars' month") was the first of ten months in the year. After the calendar reform that produced a twelve-month year, Sextilis became the eighth month, but retained its name. It was renamed Augustus (August) in 8 BC in honor of the first Roman emperor, Augustus. Sextilis followed Quintilis, which was renamed Julius (July) after Julius Caesar, and preceded September (from septem, "seven"), which was originally the seventh month.

== The month Augustus ==
Julius (July) was renamed from Quintilis ("fifth" month) in honor of Julius Caesar, who had adopted his grand-nephew Octavian, the future Augustus, and made him his heir. It has sometimes been thought that the month has 31 days because Augustus wanted as many days in his month as in his predecessor's, but Sextilis in fact had 31 days since the reform during Caesar's dictatorship that created the Julian calendar.

The decree of the Senate (senatus consultum) renaming Sextilis reads in part:

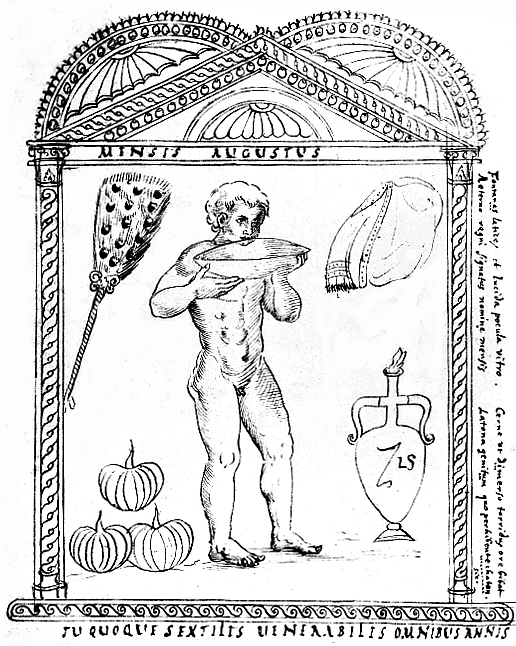
Illustration taken from the 4th-century Calendar of Filocalus

Whereas the emperor Augustus Caesar, in the month of Sextilis, was first admitted to the consulate, and thrice entered the city in triumph, and in the same month the legions, from the Janiculum, placed themselves under his auspices, and in the same month Egypt was brought under the authority of the Roman people, and in the same month an end was put to the civil wars; and whereas for these reasons the said month is, and has been, most fortunate to this empire, it is hereby decreed by the senate that the said month shall be called Augustus.

== Iconography of the month ==
The Calendar of Filocalus illustrated the month of August with a seasonal representation of summer's heat. A peacock fan overhangs a nude male who drinks from a large bowl, with his cast-off garment in the top right corner. The amphora beside him is sealed with a flower and in one extant copy is inscribed ZLS, probably a mistaken transcription for the Greek exhortation zeses, "to your health". Three mature gourds or melons are another seasonal motif.

== Dates ==
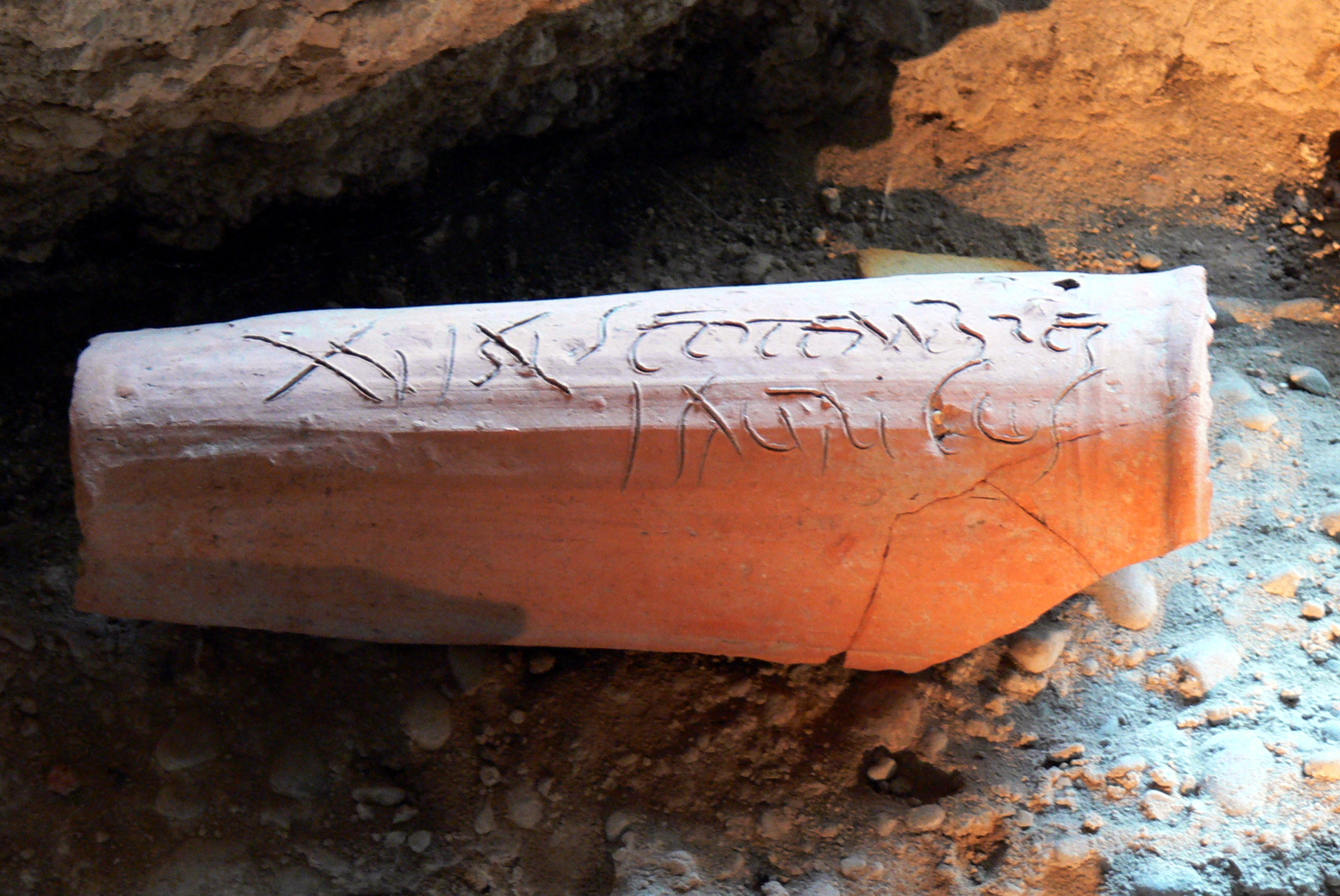
Roof tile with a Latin inscription reading XVI KALENDAS SEPTEMBRES ISAURICUS: XVI Kal. Sept. is 17 August on the Julian calendar

The Romans did not number days of a month sequentially from the 1st through the last day. Instead, they counted back from the three fixed points of the month: the Nones (5th or 7th, depending on the length of the month), the Ides (13th or 15th), and the Kalends (1st) of the following month. The Nones of August was the 5th, and the Ides the 13th. The last day of August was the pridie Kalendas Septembris, (Note: The month name is construed as an adjective modifying Kalendae, Nonae or Idūs (all plural nouns of feminine gender).) "day before the Kalends of September". Roman counting was inclusive; 9 August was ante diem V Idūs Sextīlis (ante diem V Idūs Augustas), "the 5th day before the Ides of August," usually abbreviated a.d. V Id. Sext. (a.d. V Id. Aug.), or with the a.d. omitted altogether. The Julian calendar reform added two days to Sextilis; thus on the pre-reform calendar, 23 August was VIII Kal. Sept., "the 8th day before the Kalends of September," but on the Julian calendar X Kal. Sept., "the 10th day before the Kalends of September".

On the calendar of the Roman Republic and early Principate, each day was marked with a letter to denote its religiously lawful status. In August, these were:

- F for dies fasti, days when it was legal to initiate action in the courts of civil law;
- C, for dies comitalis, a day on which the Roman people could hold assemblies (comitia), elections, and certain kinds of judicial proceedings;
- N for dies nefasti, when these political activities and the administration of justice were prohibited;
- NP, the meaning of which remains elusive, but which marked feriae, public holidays;
- EN for endotercissus, an archaic form of intercissus, "cut in half," meaning days that were nefasti in the morning, when sacrifices were being prepared, and in the evening, while sacrifices were being offered, but were fasti in the middle of the day.

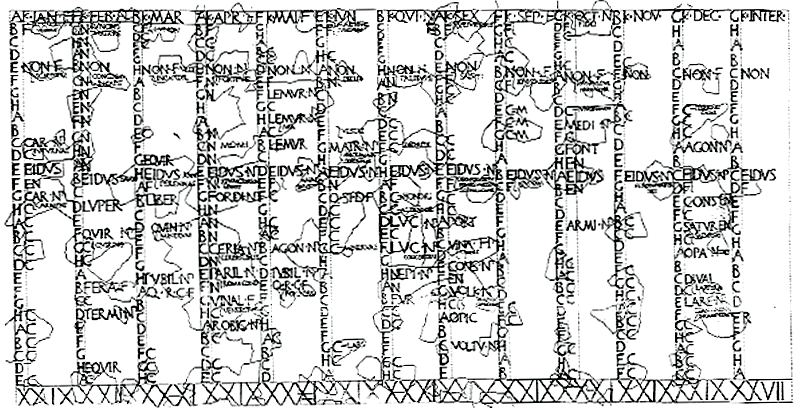
Drawing of the fragmentary Fasti Antiates, a pre-Julian calendar showing Sextilis (abbreviated SEX) at the top of the eighth column

Days were also marked with nundinal letters in cycles of A B C D E F G H, to mark the "market week" (these are omitted in the table below).

A dies natalis was an anniversary such as a temple founding or rededication, sometimes thought of as the "birthday" of a deity. During the Imperial period, some of the traditional festivals localized at Rome became less important, and the birthdays and anniversaries of the emperor and his family gained prominence as Roman holidays. On the calendar of military religious observances known as the Feriale Duranum, sacrifices pertaining to Imperial cult outnumber the older festivals. After the mid-1st century AD, a number of dates are added to calendars for spectacles and games (circenses) held in honor of various deities in the venue called a "circus". By the late 2nd century AD, extant calendars no longer show days marked with letters (F, N, C and so on) to show their religious status, probably in part as a result of calendar reforms undertaken by Marcus Aurelius. Festivals marked in large letters on extant fasti, represented by festival names in all capital letters on the table, are thought to have been the most ancient holidays, becoming part of the calendar before 509 BC.

Unless otherwise noted, the dating and observances on the following table are from H.H. Scullard, Festivals and Ceremonies of the Roman Republic (Cornell University Press, 1981), pp. 169–182. After the Ides, dates are given for the Julian calendar, with pre-Julian dates noted parenthetically for festivals.

Modern date	Roman date	status	Observances
1 August	Kalendae Sextilis; Kalendae Augustae	F	• dies natales of the Temple of Spes ("Hope") in the Forum Holitorium, and of the Two Victories on the Palatine • dies natalis and circus games in honor of the divinized emperor Pertinax (recorded by the Calendar of Filocalus in 354 AD)
2	ante diem IV Nonas Sextilis ante diem IV Nonas Augustas	F	
3	a.d. III Non. Sext. (Note: Abbreviated form of ante diem III Nonas Sextilis.) a.d. III Non. Aug. (Note: Abbreviated form of ante diem III Nonas Augustas.)	C	• supplicia canum, the punishment of the dogs
4	pridie Nonas Sextilis (abbrev. prid. Non. Sext.) pridie Nonas Augustas	C	• after the mid-1st century AD, circus games for the Victory of the Senate
5	Nonae Sextilis; Nonae Augustae	F	• dies natalis for the Temple of Salus on the Quirinal, with circus games added for Salus Publica ("Public Safety") after the mid-1st century AD
6	a.d. VIII Id. Sext. (Note: Abbreviated form of ante diem VII Idūs Sextilis, with the ante diem omitted altogether from this point.) a.d. VIII Id. Aug. (Note: Abbreviated form of ante diem VII Idūs Augustas.)	F	
7	VII Id. Sext. VII Id. Aug.	C	• dies natalis and circus games in honor of Constantius (Calendar of 354)
8	VI Id. Sext. VI Id. Aug.	C	• votive games (Calendar of 354)
9	V Id. Sext. V Id. Aug.	C	• public sacrifice for Sol Indiges on the Quirinal Hill
10	IV Id. Sext. IV Id. Aug.	C	
11	III Id. Sext. III Id. Aug.	C	
12	pridie Idūs Sextilis (abbrev. prid. Id. Sext.) pridie Idūs Augustas	C	• festival for Hercules Invictus near the Circus Maximus • dies natalis for the Temple of Venus Victrix built by Pompeius Magnus, accompanied by Honos et Virtus, Felicitas, and possibly Vesta • Lychnapsia (added after mid-1st century AD)
13	Idus Sextilis; Idus Augustae	NP	•ovis idulis, the monthly sacrifice of the Ides sheep for Jupiter • festivals for Diana and Vortumnus on the Aventine • dies natalis for the Temple of Fortuna Equestris • dies natalis for the Temple of Hercules Victor or Hercules Invictus near the Porta Trigemina; for the Temple of Castor and Pollux in the Circus Flaminius; for the Camenae on the Caelian Hill; and for the Temple of Flora near the Circus Maximus
14	ante diem XIX Kalendas Septembris (pre-Julian XVII Kal. Sept.) (Note: Because two days were added to the month as part of the Julian calendar reform)	F	
15	XVIII Kal. Sept. (Note: Abbreviated form of ante diem XVIII Kalendas Septembris/-es with the ante diem omitted altogether, as in the rest of the month following.)	C	
16	XVII Kal. Sept.	C	
17	XVI Kal. Sept.	NP	• PORTUNALIA (XIV Kal. Sept. on the pre-Julian calendar) • Tiberinalia • dies natalis for the Temple of Janus near the Theater of Marcellus
18	XV Kal. Sept.	C	
19	XIV Kal. Sept.	F	• VINALIA for Venus at the Circus Maximus, and Feriae Iovi (pre-Julian XII Kal. Sept.) • dies natalis and circus games for Probus (Calendar of 354)
20	XIII Kal. Sept.	C	
21	XII Kal. Sept.	NP	• CONSUALIA (pre-Julian X Kal. Sept. )
22	XI Kal. Sept.	EN	
23	X Kal. Sept.	NP	• VOLCANALIA (pre-Julian VIII Kal. Sept.) in honor of Volcanus (Vulcan), with circus games added after the mid-1st century AD • sacrifice to Maia in the precinct of Vulcan • sacrifice to the Nymphs, recorded only in the Fasti Arvales • dies natalis for a temple of Ops Opifera, and for a temple of the Hora of Quirinus
24	IX Kal. Sept.	C dies religiosus	• sacrifices for Luna at the Graecostasis • mundus patet, one of three days in the year when a mysterious pit or underground chamber was opened
25	VIII Kal. Sept.	NP	• OPICONSIVIA for the goddess Ops (pre-Julian VI Kal. Sept.)
26	VII Kal. Sept.	C	
27	VI Kal. Sept.	NP	• VOLTURNALIA for Volturnus (pre-Julian IV Kal. Sept.)
28	V Kal. Sept.	C	• dies natalis for the Temple of Sol and Luna, the Sun and the Moon (pre-Julian III Kal. Sept.), with circus games added after the mid-1st century AD
29	IV Kal. Sept.	C	
30	III Kal. Sept.	C	
31	prid. Kal. Sept.	C	
