= Flamen Quirinalis =

High priest of Quirinus in ancient Rome

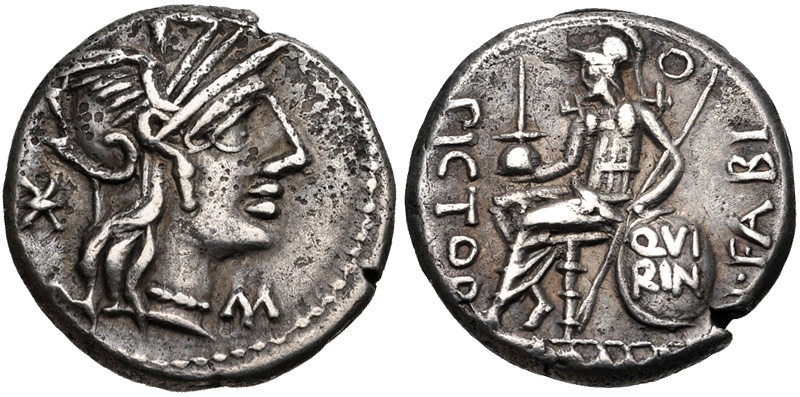
Denarius of 126 BCE; on the right is the flamen Quirinalis with QVIRIN on his shield.

In ancient Roman religion, the Flamen Quirinalis was the flamen or high priest of the god Quirinus. He was one of the three flamines maiores, third in order of importance after the Flamen Dialis and the Flamen Martialis. Like the other two high priests, he was subject to numerous ritual taboos, such as not being allowed to touch metal, ride a horse, or spend the night outside Rome. His wife functioned as an assistant priestess with the title Flaminicia Quirinalis.

The theology of Quirinus is complex and difficult to interpret. From early times, he was identified with the deified Romulus, who originally seems to have shared some common theological and mythological elements with Quirinus.

== Ritual functions ==
The flamen Quirinalis presided over at least three festivals, the Consualia Aestiva on August 21, Robigalia on April 25, and Larentalia on December 23. Beside these festivals that of Quirinus himself, the Quirinalia, would almost surely require the participation of the flamen Quirinalis. The Quirinalia were held on February 17 and must be among the oldest Roman yearly festivals.

These festivals were all devoted to the cult of deities of remarkable antiquity: Consus has been described as the god of the stored grains (from condere, to store grains in an underground barn or silos). Robigus was an evil spirit that could cause mildew and thus damage growing wheat. Larenta was a figure connected to the primordial legendary times of Rome or to the founding of the city itself.

=== Consualia Aestiva ===
During the Consualia Aestiva the flamen Quirinalis and the Vestals offered a sacrifice at Consus's underground altar in the Circus Maximus. Four days later the Vestals took part in the rites of the festival of Ops, goddess of agricultural plenty, the Opiconsivia. This occasion was related to Consus too and was performed in the Regia of the forum, where Ops had a very sacred chapel, open only to the pontifex maximus and the Vestals.

=== Robigalia ===
The Robigalia of April 25 required the sacrificial offering of blood and entrails from a puppy, and perhaps also the entrails of a sheep. The rite took place near the fifth milestone of the Via Claudia. Ovid talks of a lucus (grove) on the site and a long prayer pronounced by the flamen Quirinalis.

=== Larentalia ===
The Larentalia of December 23 were a parentatio, an act of funerary cult in memory of Larunda or Larentia. A sacrifice was offered at the site of her supposed tomb on the Velabrum. She was not a goddess but a sort of heroine, with two conflicting legends:

In the first story (and probably elder one) Larentia is a courtesan who had become fabulously rich after spending a night in the sanctuary of Heracles. Later she had bestowed her fortune on the Roman people on the condition that a rite named after her were held yearly.

In the second story she is Romulus and Remus's wet nurse, also considered the mother of the Fratres Arvales and a she wolf. Gellius in a detailed passage on Larentia makes a specific reference to the flamen Quirinalis. Macrobius makes reference to the presence of an unnamed flamen, "per flaminem". This flamen could neither be the Dialis nor the Martialis, let alone the minores, given the nature of parentatio (funeral rite) of the festival, leaving only the Quirinalis as the likely flamen mentioned by Macrobius.

== Quirinalia ==
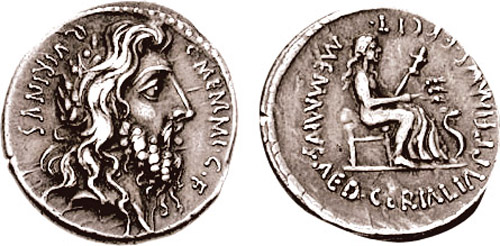
Denarius picturing Quirinus on the obverse, and Ceres on the reverse

The Quirinalia occurred on February 17 in the Roman calendar (a.d. XIII Kal. Mart.).

Some scholars connect the Quirinalia with the anniversary date of the murder of Romulus by his subjects on the basis of the calendar of Polemius Silvius and of Ovid, where the story of Romulus's apotheosis is related, and accordingly interpret the festival as a funerary parentatio.

Dumezil on the other hand remarks that in all other sources the date of this event is July 7 (Nonae Caprotinae). Neither there is any record of such a ritual in ancient sources. He puts forward another interpretation based on the fact that the only religious ritual recorded for that day are the stultorum feriae, i.e. the last day of the Fornacalia. This festival used to be celebrated separately by each of the thirty curiae. Therefore, the Fornacalia had no fixed date and were not mentioned on calendars. Every year the curio maximus established the days for each curia. However those who had missed their day (stulti, dull ones) were allowed an extra off day to make amends collectively. Festus and Plutarch state that the stultorum feriae were in fact the Quirinalia. Their assertion seems acceptable to Dumézil for two reasons:

1. If it were not so then no Roman writer gave any indication of their content. This is highly unlikely for in Rome religious rituals often survived their theological justification.
2. The stultorum feriae bring to an end the organised operation of the curiae in the Fornacalia and this is a guarantee of their antiquity.

The connection hypothesized by Dumezil between the flamen Quirinalis and an activity regulated through the curiae is important as it supports the interpretation of Quirinus as a god of the Roman civil society. The curiae were in fact the original smallest grouping of Roman society.

The most probable etymology of curia is considered by many scholars, to be rooted in *co-viria and that of quirites in *co-virites.

The Virites were goddesses worshipped along with Quirinus: Gellius, writes to have read in the pontificales libri, that dea Hora and Virites were invoked in prayers in association with the god. The Virites, Quirinus's female paredrae, must be the expression of the god's virtus, in the case of Quirinus namely the personification of the individuals composing Roman society as citizens, in the same way as e.g. Nerio, Mars's paredra, must be the personification of military prowess.

Hence Quirinus would be the Roman homologous of the correspondent last component god of the supreme divine triad among all Italic peoples, such as the Vofionus of the Iguvine Tables, whose name too has been interpreted as a term meaning the increaser of the people (either from Loifer, or from Luther, an abbreviation from Greek Eleutheros) or simply the people, related to German Leute. This hypothesis is confirmed by the fact that the two first god names at Iguvium are identical to their Roman counterpart (Jov- and Mart-) and grammatically were nouns, whereas name Vofiono- is an adjectival derivation in no- of a noun root, just as *Co-virino. Moreover, philologists Vittor Pisani and Emile Benveniste have proposed a likely etymology for Vofiono- that makes it the equivalent in meaning of *Co-virino: Leudhyo-no.

== Relation to Dumezil's trifunctional hypothesis ==
The Consualia, Robigalia, Larentalia, and the last act of Fornacalia (the Quirinalia) are the religious rituals performed by flamen Quirinalis. If Romans' traditions were conserved, rather than re-adapted, these rituals should reflect the most ancient and original nature of god Quirinus. The festivals connect him to wheat at the three important and potentially risky stages of its growth, storing, and preservation. Quirinus is thus concerned with a staple food. He cooperates with god Consus, as is testified by the role of his flamen in the Consualia, to the aim of assuring the nurture of the Roman people.

There is also a connection between the function of the flamen Quirinalis in the Quirinalia and the functioning of organized Roman society as expressed through the role played by the curiae in the Fornacalia. The curiae were in fact the smallest cell of ancient Roman society. The role of the flamen Quirinalis in the Larentalia is also significant. In the two legends concerning Larentia she is a figure related to nurture, agricultural plenty, and wealth. She rears the divine twins, is the mother of the Fratres Arvales, performers of the agricultural propitiary rite of the Ambarvalia, and bestows wealth on her heirs and figurative children. Her story hints to the link of sexual pleasure and wealth. In the interpretation of Dumézil this has to do with the Indo-European myth of the divine twins, but Romulus's connections to kingship and war are not necessarily part of the original conception of Quirinus.

According to Dumezil the theological character of the god as reflected in the functions of his flamen is thence civil and social, being related to nurture, fertility, plenty, wealth, and pleasure. This features make him the chief of all the gods of what he defines as the third function in Indo-European religions.

== Brelich's identification of Romulus with Quirinus as a mythical archetype of primitive religion ==
Italo-Hungarian religious historian Angelo Brelich advanced a hypothesis that could bring together all of the poorly understood elements of the religious traditions concerning Romulus and Quirinus. He argues it is not likely that the two figures were merged at a later stage in the development of the legend, but they were in fact one since the most ancient times. This view allows us to understand why the Fornacalia, the feast of the toasting of spelt, were also one of the traditional dates of the murder of Romulus: according to this tradition the king was killed by the patres, his body dismembered and each bit of it buried within their own plots of land. Brelich sees in this episode a clear reflection of a mythical theme found in primitive religion and known as the Dema deity archetype (from the character of Hainuwele in Melanesian religion first described by German ethnologist Adolf Ellegard Jensen). In such a pattern a founder hero is murdered and dismembered, his corpse turning into the staple food of his own ethnos.
