= Altar of Consus =

Altar to the Roman gods Consus and Mars

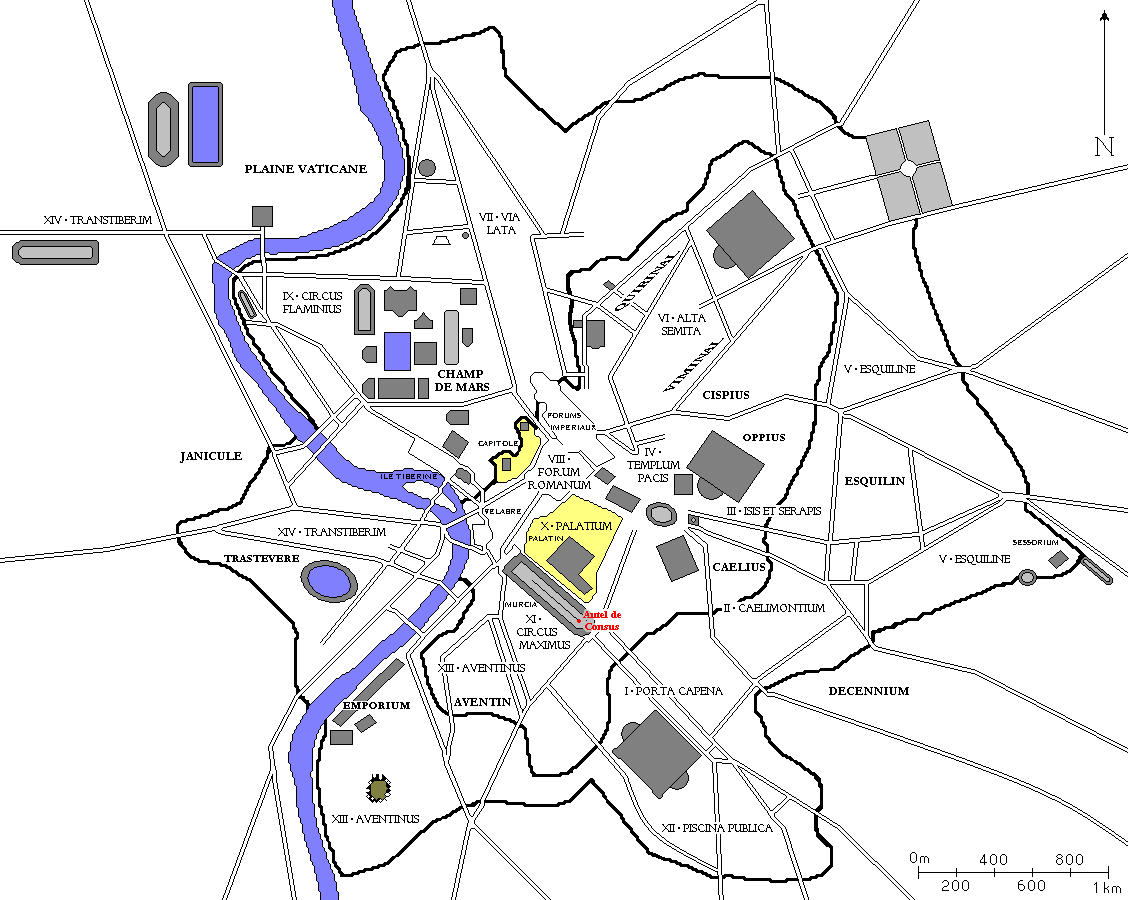
Location of the Altar of Consus in the city of Rome. The altar is highlighted in red.

The Altar of Consus (Latin: Ara Consi) was an ancient Roman altar dedicated to the gods Consus and Mars, as well as the lares, which were ancient Roman household guardians. It was located beneath the Circus Maximus. The altar may have also served as the first turning post of the Circus Maximus. It is possible the subterranean location of this altar is connected to the Roman practice of storing wheat underground and specifically paralleled by the ancient mundus of Ceres supposedly instituted by Romulus at the founding of the city. This is in turn associated with the modern interpretation of Consus as an agrarian deity. Dionysus of Halicarnassus wrote that some ancient Romans believed the altar was located underground because they thought that the god Consus corresponded to Poseidon, who was also a god of earthquakes. He also claims that other Romans believed that the altar was dedicated to an unamenable god who presided over hidden councils. This explanation is associated with the ancient connections between Consus and secrecy and hidden councils. Tacitus mentions the altar as a landmark of his conjectural reconstruction of the pomerium, the sacred border of the city of Rome proper, as originally established by Romulus's sulcus primigenius.

The site was covered for most of the year, although it was uncovered during religious occasions for sacrifices and rituals. Roman author Tertullian stated that public priests made sacrifices at the altar on 7 July during the Caprotinia. He also wrote that the Flamen Quirinalis and a group of virgins, potentially the Vestal Virgins, made sacrifices at the altar on 21 August. This was in celebration of the Consualia, a Roman holiday which honored Consus. As part of this holiday, games commemorating the Rape of the Sabine Women were held at this altar.

Tertullian wrote that it bore an inscription which read:

Consus consilio, Mars duello, Lares coillo potentes

This translates to:

Consus is mighty in counsel, Mars in war, the Lares in coillo

This inscription may not be authentically archaic. Many modern scholars are critical of the potential etymological link between Consus and consilium, the Latin word for counsel. The German classical philologist Georg Wissowa argued that in a genuine ancient inscription from this time period the names of the gods would be expected to be in the dative case, not in the nominative, which is the case used in the inscription. Theodor Mommsen, a German classical scholar, believed that Tertullian may have incorrectly transcribed the Latin words coitu or cubiclo when he utilized the word coillo. Alternatively, it may have been a transcription of the Greek word for the Lacus Curtius. Coillo could possibly be a synonym of Compito. The Latin word compito means crossroads, and the Lares were frequently worshipped at these crossroads. Similarly, consilio has been theorized to be a misreading of consivio, meaning "gathering of the harvest." This theory has been criticized for being unsupported by Tertullian, who appears to have directly derived the word consilio from his source.
