= Temple of Ops =

- Shown in ancient Rome
- Interactive map of Temple of Ops
- 41°53′30″N 12°28′54″E

The Temple of Ops was a minor temple on the Capitoline Hill in Rome. It was dedicated to Ops (later known as Abundantia), the deity of abundance.

The temple is first mentioned in 186 BC. It was on the southern part of the Area Capitolina, slightly to the north of the Temple of Faith, in a vast piazza in front of the Temple of Jupiter Optimus Maximus. It collapsed several times. The temple is last mentioned in 17 AD. If still in use by the 4th-century, it would have been closed during the persecution of pagans in the late Roman Empire.

Remains found near the church of Sant'Omobono (including fragments of columns, part of a cement podium and a large female marble head, probably from a temple's acroterion) have previously been identified as fragments of the Temple of Ops. It is now thought, however, that these were from the Temple of Faith, due to the nearby discovery of bilingual inscriptions in Greek and Latin and fragments of treaties between Asia Minor and the Roman Senate - Faith was the goddess of diplomatic relations.

== See also ==
- List of Ancient Roman temples

== Bibliography ==
- Filippo Coarelli, Guida archeologica di Roma, Verona, Arnoldo Mondadori Editore, 1984.
- http://penelope.uchicago.edu/Thayer/E/Gazetteer/Places/Europe/Italy/Lazio/Roma/Rome/_Texts/PLATOP*/Aedes_Opis.html
