= Consus =

Ancient Roman god of grains

In ancient Roman religion, the god Consus was the protector of grains. He was represented by a grain seed. His altar (ara) was located at the first meta of the Circus Maximus. It was either underground, or according to other sources, covered with earth, which was swept off during the two Consualia, his festivals on August 21, December 15, and on July 7 when the pontiffs held a sacrifice there. He was thus a chthonic god.

The Flamen Quirinalis and the Vestals officiated at his rites. (Note: Lipka (2009), who cites Tertullian.)

== Etymology ==
The etymology of the name Consus is uncertain. It may be of Etruscan or Sabine origin. In the folk etymology of antiquity, the name was related to the Latin verb conserere, "to sow," as was the title of the goddess Ops as Consivia or Consiva.

The late Republican theologian Varro said that the Consualia were named for Consus. G. Dumézil and G. Capdeville consider verb condere, "to store", to be the best etymology: Consus would be an archaic verbal noun denoting the action of storing grain.

Capdeville states that Consus cannot be related to conserere and adjective consivius, and advances the hypothesis that condere might have to be taken in the meaning of "to found" or "establish".

Ancient sources, Festus included, were very fond of the similar sound of Consus and consilium, and allegorically interpreted his name as relating to "council" or "assembly" (consilium). Moreover, Tertullian reports that on one of the metae of the Circus Maximus an inscription read: "Consus consilio, Mars duello, Lares coillo po[tentes]". which may be archaic considering co[v]illo and external factors. This is close to "hide" too cf. abdere, (abs)condere. This derivation is certain, but on the other hand, as de Vaan writes on the etymology of consilium, it is very uncertain whence comes the head word, consulere-solere, although very probably not from con-sideo.

== Function and associations ==
The festivals of Ops (Opiconsivia or Opalia) followed Consus' closely, being held every August 25 and December 19, at the time of reaping and the seeding of crops.

Consus became a god associated with secret conferences. The grammarian Servius says that Consus is the god of councils. This fact stems from the role played by Consus in the abduction of the Sabine women, which took place on the occasion of the Consualia aestiva and was considered to have been advised by the god himself. This power of hidden counselling held by Consus seems to be related to the concept expressed by Dionysius and Plutarch that he is the "holder" of the Earth, an idea that makes of him a parallel to Neptune.

So although it is certain that condere and consulere are from two different roots, it looks the character of Consus as hidden master of the Earth was at the basis of the identification with Neptune, as well as the strict affinity of the two gods with the horse.

According to G. Capdeville, it was a customary event that games were held at the foundation of a new settlement. These were connected with rituals that included athletic games such as footraces and marriage games along with invitations to settle in the new town: He mentions the instances of Caeculus at Praeneste and other settlements in Crete (Dreros, Hierapytna, Praisos, Lyttos, Knossos). These events all had a religious meaning. In Crete, as well as in Rome, it looks like the god involved was Vulcan (Bελχάνος), i.e. the Cretan megas Kouros, later interpreted as Zeus. In Rome the relationship of Vulcan with Consus is apparent in the dates of their festivals and the fact that the flamen volcanalis officiated at the Calends of May the sacrifice to Bona Dea.

Consus is perhaps to be identified with "Equestrian Neptune" (Neptunus Equestris). Mule or horse races were the main event of the festival. During the festival horses and mules were garlanded with flowers, and given a rest from work. This fact is ascribed by Capdeville to the fact that Poseidon was the successor of the unknown god of the Arcadian Hippocrateia mentioned by Dionysius of Halicarnassus, who himself was perhaps the successor of a horse god. A close connection of Consus with the two Pales and of both with the horse looks apparent. (Note: Capdeville (1993) also citing Dumézil, G. (1956). "[article on the mare Viśpala of the RgVeda]". Eranos.)
