= Tiberinalia =

Late Imperial Roman festival in honor of Tiber

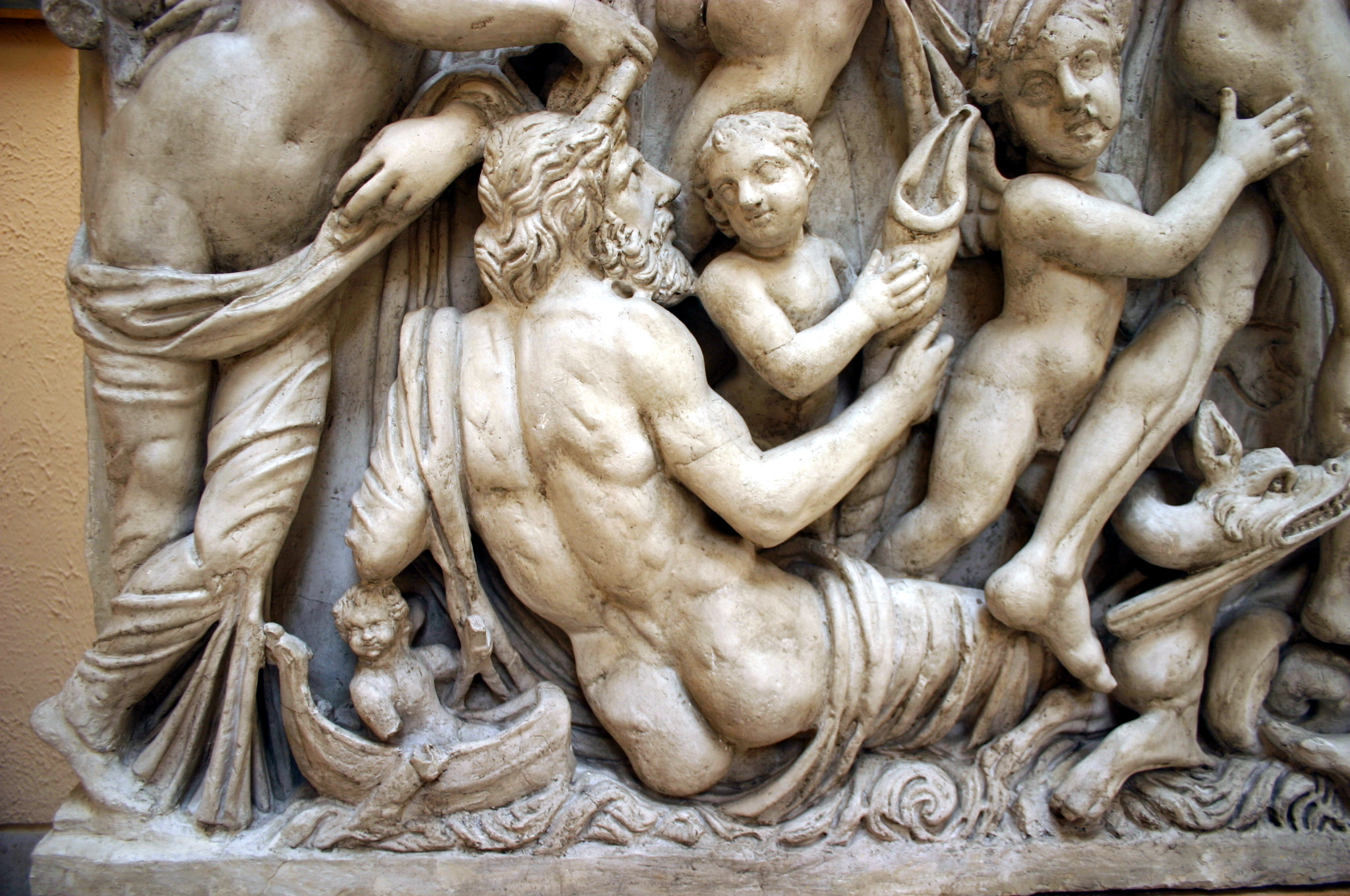
The Tiber, in the characteristic reclining posture of a river god, on the Mattei sarcophagus, in a detail from the scene of Mars approaching Rhea Silvia for the union that produced Romulus and Remus

The Tiberinalia is a Roman festival of late antiquity, recorded in the Calendar of Filocalus (354 AD), on August 17 (XVI Kal. Sept.), the same day as the archaic Portunalia. As a festival honoring Father Tiber, it may reflect renewed Imperial patronage of traditional Roman deities, in particular the dedication made to Tiberinus by the emperors Diocletian (reigned 284–305) and Maximianus.

August's festivals deal with themes of agricultural bounty ensured by sun and water, centering on the Volcanalia of Volcanus (Vulcan) on August 23. The Portunalia, like the Volcanalia, was represented in large letters on extant fasti, indicating that it was regarded as among the most ancient holidays that were on the calendar before 509 BC.

Portunus was originally a guardian of gateways and only later by extension a harbor god, and his relation to Tiber or Tiberinus as god of the Tiber river is debatable; some have seen the Tiberinalia as assimilating the archaic Portunalia. Theodor Mommsen inferred that the two gods were the same, but other scholars have rejected the identification. Varro says that the Portunalia marks the institution of a shrine (aedes) to Portunus in portu Tiberino, but the meaning of portus here is unclear; Ovid mentions atria Tiberina ("halls of Tiberinus").
