= Ops =

Ancient Roman goddess of fertility and the earth

- Goddess of Agriculture, Abundance, and the Earth
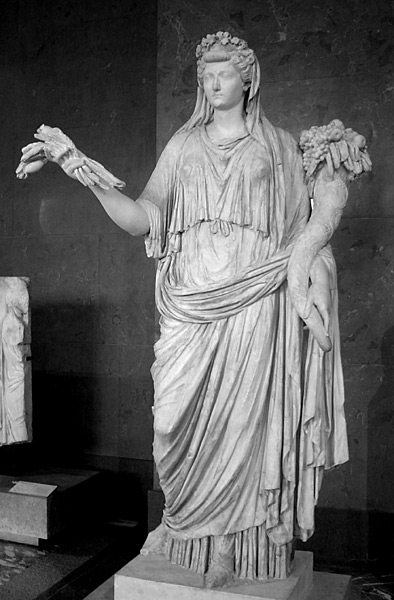
- Roman empress Livia attired as the goddess Ops, holding a cornucopia and sheaf of wheat
- Other names: Opes, Opis
- Symbol: Wheat, corn, cornucopia
- Gender: Female
- Temple: Temple of Ops
- Festivals: Opiconsivia, Opalia
- Consort: Saturn

Equivalents
- Greek: Rhea

In ancient Roman religion, Ops, (Latin: "Plenty") also spelled Opes or Opis, was a fertility and earth goddess of abundance, prosperity, and agriculture, and the consort of Saturn. As Ops Consiva, she presided over the reserved portion of the harvest alongside Consus, the god of stored grain. She was celebrated during two yearly festivals: Opiconsivia in August and Opalia in December.

Ops was frequently compared to goddesses like Demeter, Cybele, Ceres, and Terra, who were similarly associated with the earth and agriculture. She was conflated with the Greek Rhea, mother of the first generation Olympians and consort of Cronus, the Greek equivalent of Saturn.

== Etymology ==
The Latin word ops means "opulence, riches, goods, abundance, gifts, munificence, plenty." The word is also related to opus, which means "work," particularly in the sense of "working the earth, ploughing, sowing." Ops is also related to the Sanskrit word ápnas ("goods, property").

== Origins ==
The origins of Ops as a goddess are unclear. In De Lingua Latina, Varro claims that Ops was a deity of Sabine origin worshipped by Titus Tatius— a stance later repeated by Dionysius of Halicarnassus and Augustine. She may have been associated with the Sabines due to her being an agricultural goddess, and therefore associated with the countryside; the Sabines were similarly associated with non-urban environments by those living in Rome. However, modern scholarship has suggested more convoluted origins, with Ops likely being a combination of Etruscan, Italic, Sabinic, Hellenic, and Roman elements.

== Function and worship ==
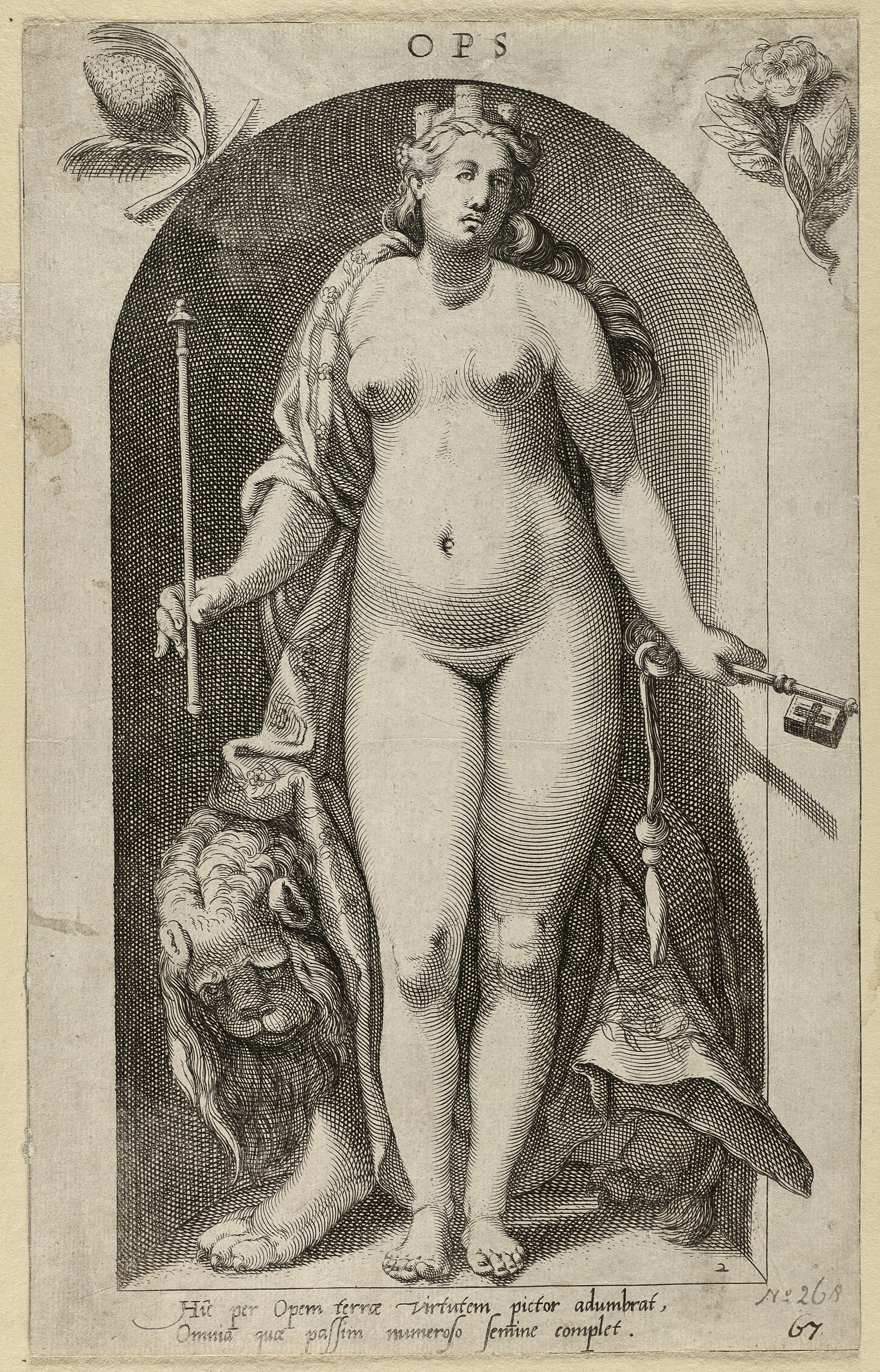
16th century print depicting Ops in the nude. She was likely confused with Cybele in this depiction, as she is pictured with a lion, key, and a crown in the form of a wall with towers, all symbols commonly associated with Cybele

Ops' name and function was discussed in Varro's De Lingua Latina, which identified her as the wife of Saturn, another agricultural god. (Note: Saturn was a chthonic deity, as was her close associate, Consus. As she was an earth goddess and associated with the storage of grain, Ops may have similarly been connected to the underworld.) He additionally conflated her with Isis and Terra, and compared her functions to those of Ceres. Varro claimed that, as Saturn embodied the sky, Ops embodied the earth, and was therefore referred to as "mother." Similar understandings of Ops' function were attested to by Festus and Verris Flaccus, who identified her as both an agricultural goddess and counterpart of Saturn. Varro additionally connected the name Ops directly with opus: "work," specifically the working of the earth. Macrobius, writing in the 5th century, similarly identified her with the work required to grow crops (again using opus), and claimed that men prayed to the goddess before beginning to work the earth in order honor her as "mother of mortals."

She was additionally a goddess of abundance as the creator of economies linked to farming and agriculture at large, particularly cereals. As the guarantor of abundant harvest and food security, Ops may have been worshipped as a protector of Rome— a claim put forth by Macrobius. She may have additionally been abstractly connected to the production or procurement of wealth. The word ops is etymologically related to the words opulenti ("opulence") and opima ("rich, fertile"), and she was bestowed with the epithet Ops Consiva ("she who sows"). Ops Consiva was a goddess associated with the reserved portion (condere) of the harvest, and was associated closely with Consus, god of stored grain and consilium.

After the Roman Republic's conquest of Greece and the influence of Hellenic mythology and culture on Roman culture, Ops became increasingly conflated with the Greek Rhea: wife of Cronus and mother of the first generation Olympians. Greek myths were sometimes taken in their entirety and reworked with the gods' Roman counterparts. For example, when they translated the story of Rhea hiding her children from Cronus, Livius Andronicus and Ennius rendered the story faithfully and simply replaced "Rhea" with "Ops." Similarly, Ovid described Ops as both the wife and sister of Saturn; Rhea and Cronus were full-blooded siblings as the children of Uranus and Gaia. In Plautus' comedic play Persa, Ops is referred to as the mother of Jupiter, and in his Cistellaria, Juno is referred to as the daughter of Jupiter and the granddaughter of Ops. In these accounts, Ops' functions outside being the wife of Saturn and the mother of multiple gods are not mentioned.

== Festivals ==
Ops Consiva was celebrated during the Opiconsivia, a festival held in and around the Regia on August 25, possibly marking the end of the harvest. The Opalia, a second festival celebrating the goddess on December 19, was held in the Forum, and occurred immediately after or during Saturnalia. The exact significance and reasoning behind the Opalia are unclear, but it was possibly held to mark the end of the year or celebrate the completion of work and the promise of future harvests. It is unknown whether the goddess was worshipped simply as "Ops" or as "Ops Consiva" during the December festival. She may have additionally been celebrated as Ops Consiva during the festival celebrating Consus, the Consualia, held on December 15.

Ops received a cultuic revival under the reign of Augustus. The Fasti Vallenses, Fasti Amiternini, and Fasti Antiates indicate that Augustus established altars in the Vicus Jugarius dedicated to Ceres Mater and Ops Augusta in 7 AD, and designated August 10 as a holiday celebrating the two goddesses. His decision was likely influenced by a severe famine reportedly occurring at the time.

== Temples ==
According to Macrobius, Philochorus claimed that Cecrops, king of Attica, was the first to build a temple to Saturn and Ops where they were worshipped as Jupiter and Earth. When crops had been harvested, the head of the household would eat with the slaves who worked the land— paying honor to those responsible for the harvest was considered pleasing to the gods. Macrobius claims that these celebrations were later adapted into the Roman festival of Saturnalia.

In Rome, Ops Consiva had a poorly documented cult and a sacrarium in the Regia, a temple only the pontifex maximus and the Vestal Virgins could enter; it is not clear whether this restriction was only imposed during her festivals. Two items were mentioned by Festus as being held in the goddess' sacrarium: a ritual knife (secespita) and a bronze vase used in sacrifices (praefericulum).

Ops additionally had a temple on the Capitol near the Temple of Fides and the Temple of Jupiter, but what little evidence there is attesting to its existence is scant and fragmentary, and mostly dated to the Republican Era. It was mentioned by both Pliny and Livy; using their writings, the temple's terminus ante quem is estimated 186 BC, and could have been founded by Lucius Caecilius Metellus or Aulus Atilius Calatinus, who dedicated temples to Fides and Spes on the Capitol around 250 BC. Cicero wrote about how, in 50 BC, Caesar deposited a portion of the Roman treasury in the temple of Ops, which was later retrieved by Mark Antony. This story was also covered by Appian. Additionally, Julius Obsequens recorded a supernatural occurrence in 44 BC, when the temple doors shut on their own, and in 17 BC, the Augustan Ludi Saeculares were recorded partially taking place at the temple. Little else is known about the temple and the methods of worship associated with it, but its construction could have marked a change in the Romans' perception of the deity; she could have taken on a more political role and become a deity responsible for the protection of Rome, similar to Jupiter and Fides. However, the episode concerning Caesar and the treasury indicate that she was likely still closely associated with abundance at the time.

== Iconography ==
Coins and statues of Ops typically depict her sitting down, and she usually holds a scepter, sheath of wheat, corn spray, or a cornucopia.

== Literature ==
She is remembered in De Mulieribus Claris, a collection of biographies of historical and mythological women by the Florentine author Giovanni Boccaccio, composed in 1361–1362. It is notable as the first collection devoted exclusively to biographies of women in Western literature.
