= Fides (deity) =

Roman goddess of trust

- Goddess of Trust, Credibility, and Good Faith
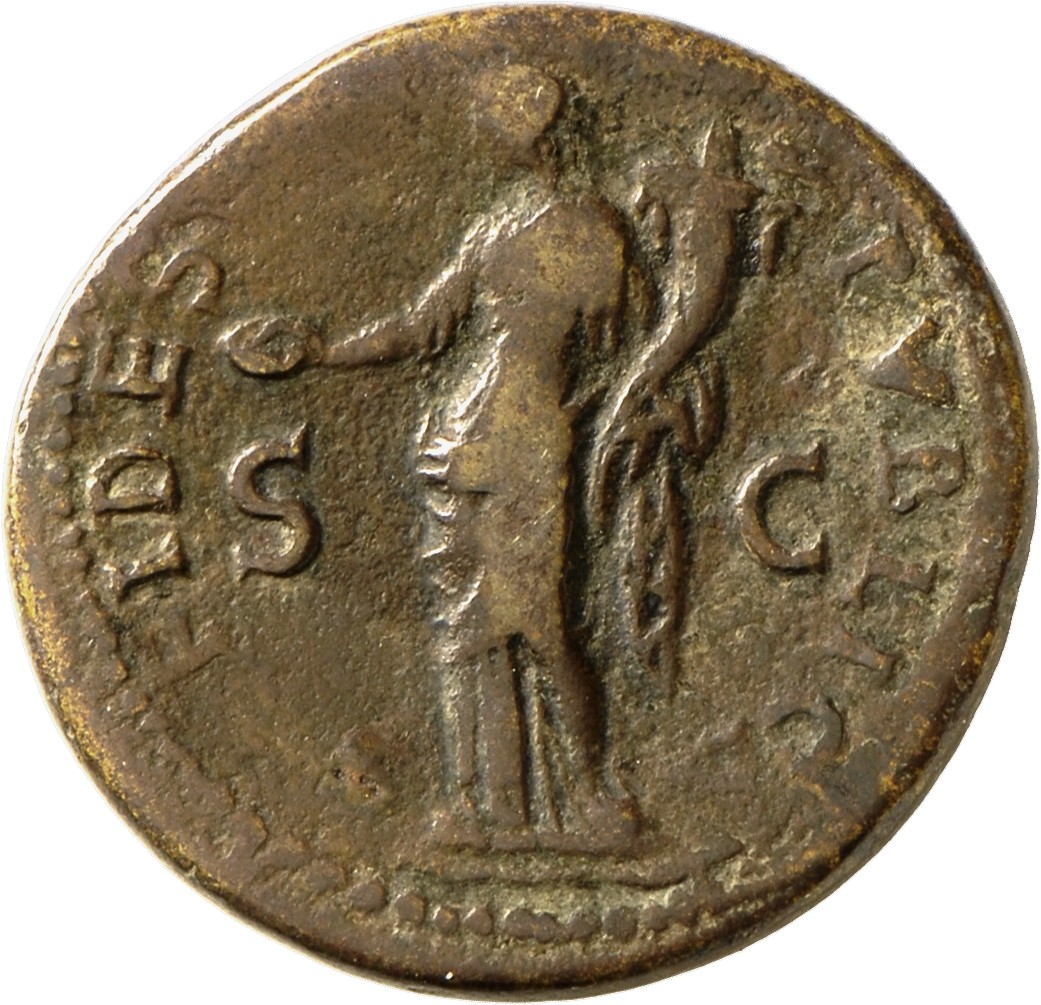
- Fides Publica holding a cornucopia and extending a libation bowl on the reverse of a dupondius issued by Vespasian (77–78 AD)
- Major cult center: Rome
- Animals: Turtle dove, eagle
- Symbols: Military ensign, cornucopia, fruit, grain ear
- Temple: Temple of Fides

Equivalents
- Greek: Pistis

In ancient Roman religion, Fides (Latin: Fidēs) was the goddess and embodiment of trust, faithfulness, and good faith (Bona Fides). Fides was one of the original Roman virtues to be cultivated as a divinity with ceremonies and temples.

== Functions ==
Fides was a multifaceted concept in Roman society, being both a set of ideals and a goddess. Fides embodied everything that was required for "honour and credibility, from fidelity in marriage, to contractual arrangements, and the obligation soldiers owed to Rome." One of its core meanings was confidence; both the confidence that one bestows in another, and the credibility one enjoys when confidence is bestowed upon them. As a goddess, Fides was the protector of promises made between parties, and violations of a promise could be seen as an affront to the goddess herself.

Violation of Fides were punished under divine law (fas) in the Roman Kingdom, and was overseen by pontiffs. A cliens ("client") could participate in a hierarchical but mutual relationship with a patronus ("patron") based on the fulfillment of reciprocal duties. Severe violations of Fides in a patronage relationship could result in the violator being declared sacer. During the Roman Republic, ideals embodied by Fides were additionally incorporated into secular law (ius) and overseen by the censors. A violation of Fides was considered an offence against traditional societal values, and violators could be designated ignominia: a temporary status that deprived the individual of good social standing.

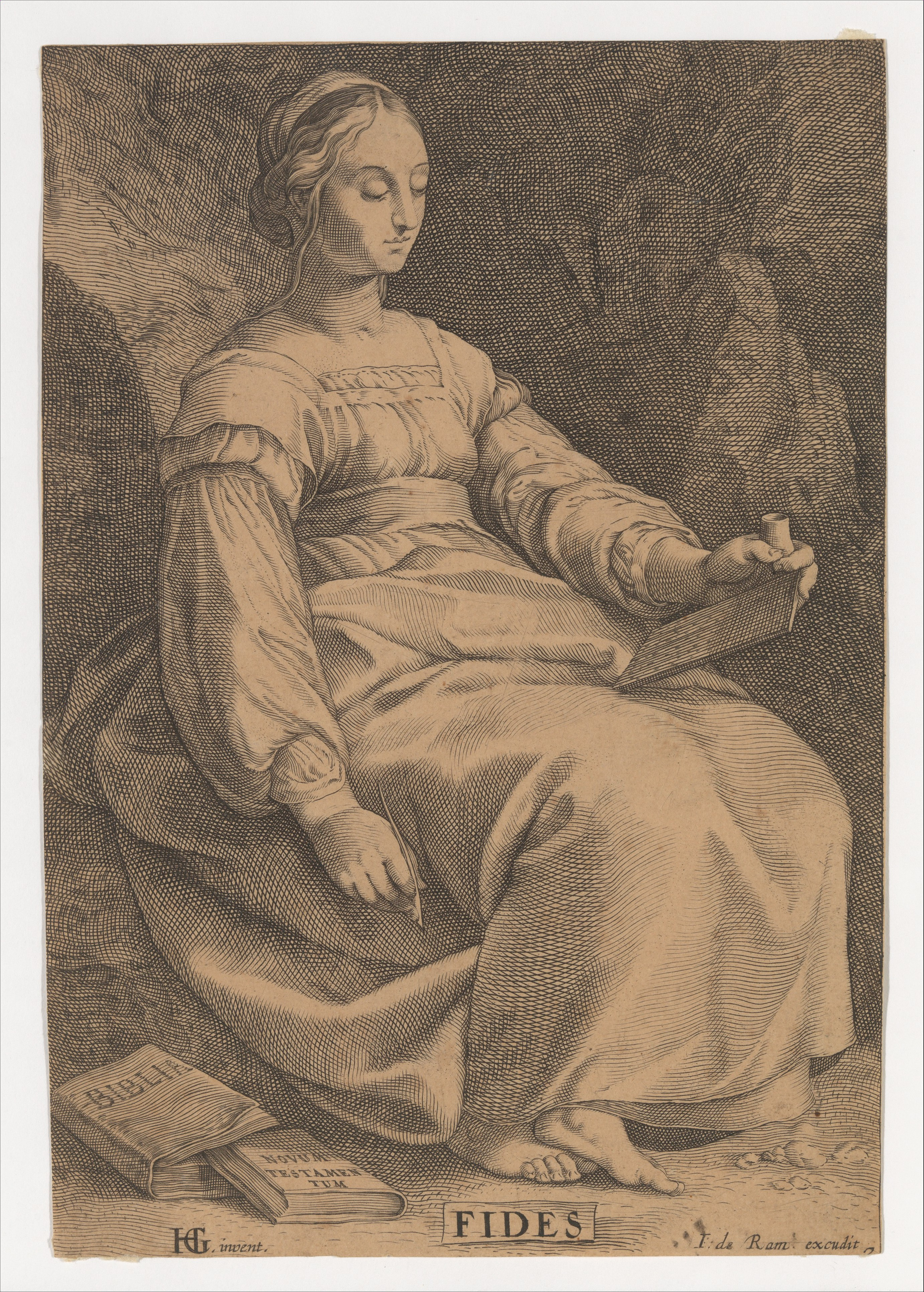
Fides depicted with a quill and inkwell, 17th century Dutch print after Hendrick Goltzius

Fides was also tied to international relationships and the rules of war. Fides in Bello ("Good Faith in War") required Roman soldiers to adhere to chivalrous conduct in battle and Deditio in Fidem ("Surrender to the Faith") applied to conquered peoples surrendering to Roman rule, and therefore adopting Roman Fides. Fides Militum ("Fidelity of the Troops") required soldiers to obey their superiors, and Fides Exercitus ("Loyalty of the Army") embodied loyalty to the military.

=== Bona Fides ===
Bona Fides ("Good Faith") was a key element of ancient Roman law. While it similarly embodied honesty and trust, it specifically applied to dealings between persons and contracts, and implied the absence of fraud in all dealings. In his De Officiis, Cicero held Bona Fides to be the foundation of justice, and held it to be a prerequisite for honorable and trustworthy conduct. Loans (commodatum), gift-giving, and debts were governed by Bona Fides, and served as a foundation for the trust required in relationships between debtor and creditor or lender and borrower. Breaches of Bona Fides in lending included actions such as misuse of or damage to the borrowed property; damage to property that was out of the borrower's control was not seen as a violation of Bona Fides. Trials that arose concerning contracts made in Bona Fides judged the honesty and fairness of the parties involved in the contract.

=== Fides Publica ===
Under the name Fides Publica Populi Romani ("Public Trust of the Roman People"), Fides became closely associated with the state: outlining a general standard of morality and behavior expected of those in power. Tablets inscribed with international agreements and rules for honorably discharged soldiers were hung in her temple, which was also occasionally used for Senate meetings. Ideas embodied by Fides were applied to Roman politicians and leaders such as general and consul Marcus Atilius Regulus, who was described as prioritizing the country instead of his interests, therefore "[acting] with fides."

== Iconography ==
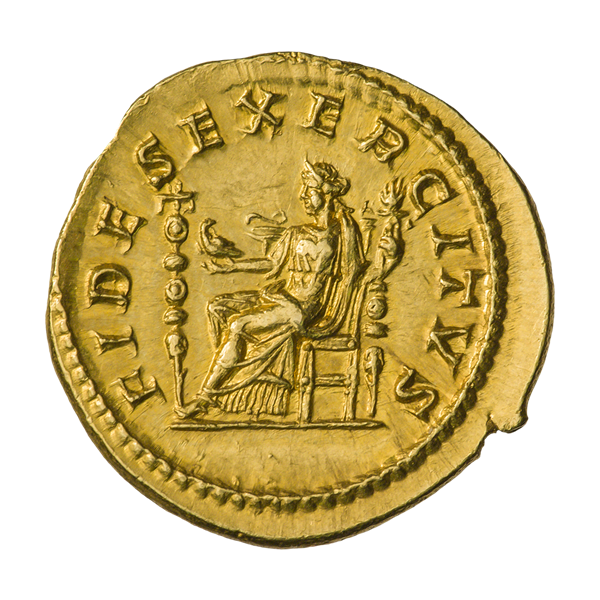
Reverse of an aureus issued ca. 218-219 under Elagabalus, with the legend FIDES EXERCITVS ("loyalty of the army"); Fides, enthroned, regards a military standard

Fides was represented as a young woman crowned with an olive or laurel wreath, holding in her hands a turtle dove, a basket of fruit, ears of grain, a cornucopia, or a military ensign. She often wore a white veil.

== Temple and ceremonies ==
The Temple of Fides on the Capitoline Hill was associated with Fides Publica Populi Romani (Fides Publica). Presumably built and dedicated by Aulus Atilius Calatinus in 254 or 250 BC, and later restored by Marcus Aemilius Scaurus in 115 BC, the structure was surrounded by a display of bronze tables of laws and treaties, and was used for Senate meetings.

According to tradition, Rome's second king, Numa Pompilius, instituted a yearly ceremony on 1 October devoted to Fides Publica, in which the three flamines maiores (major priests)— the Dialis, Martialis, and Quirinalis— were brought to her temple in a covered arched chariot drawn by two horses. There they would conduct her services with their heads covered and right hands wrapped up to the fingers to indicate absolute devotion to her and symbolise trust.

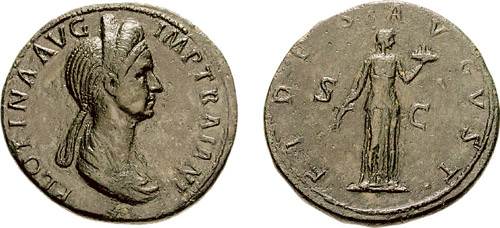
Sestertius struck ca. 112 AD, depicting Pompeia Plotina, the Augusta of the emperor Trajan, with Fides on the reverse holding ears of grain and a basket of fruit

== See also ==
- Harpocrates – Greek god of silence, secrets and confidentiality.
- Piety (Pietas), Hope (Spes), and Luck (Fortuna) – also embodied as goddesses by the Romans
- Semo Sancus – Roman god of trust, honesty, and oaths
