= Opiconsivia =

Roman religious festival

- Observed by: Roman Republic, Roman Empire
- Type: Classical Roman religion
- Date: 25 August

The Opiconsivia (or Opeconsiva or Opalia) was an ancient Roman religious festival held August 25 in honor of Ops ("Plenty"), also known as Opis, a goddess of agricultural resources and wealth. The festival marked the end of harvest, with a mirror festival on December 19 (during Saturnalia) concerned with the storage of the grain.

The Latin word consivia (or consiva) derives from conserere ("to sow"). Opis was deemed a chthonic (underworld, inside the earth) goddess who made the vegetation grow. Since her abode was inside the earth, Ops was invoked by her worshipers while sitting, with their hands touching the ground, according to Macrobius (Saturnalia, I:10).

Although Ops is a consort of Saturn, she was closely associated with Consus, the protector of grains and subterranean storage bins (silos). Consus is therefore thought to be an alternate name of Saturn in the chthonic aspect as consort. The festival of Consus, the Consualia, was celebrated twice a year, each time preceding that of Ops: once on August 21, after the harvest, and once on December 15, after the sowing of crops was finished.

The Opiconsivia festival was superintended by the Vestals and the Flamines of Quirinus, an early Sabine god said to be the deified Romulus. Quirinus was absorbed by, and included in, the first and earliest Capitoline Triad, along with Mars—then an agriculture god—and Jupiter. The main priestess at the regia wore a white veil, characteristic of the vestal virgins. A chariot race was performed in the Circus Maximus. Horses and mules, their heads crowned with chaplets made of flowers, also took part in the celebration.
