= Temple of Fides =

Ancient Roman temple

- Shown in ancient Rome
- Interactive map of Temple of Fides
- 41°53′29″N 12°28′52″E

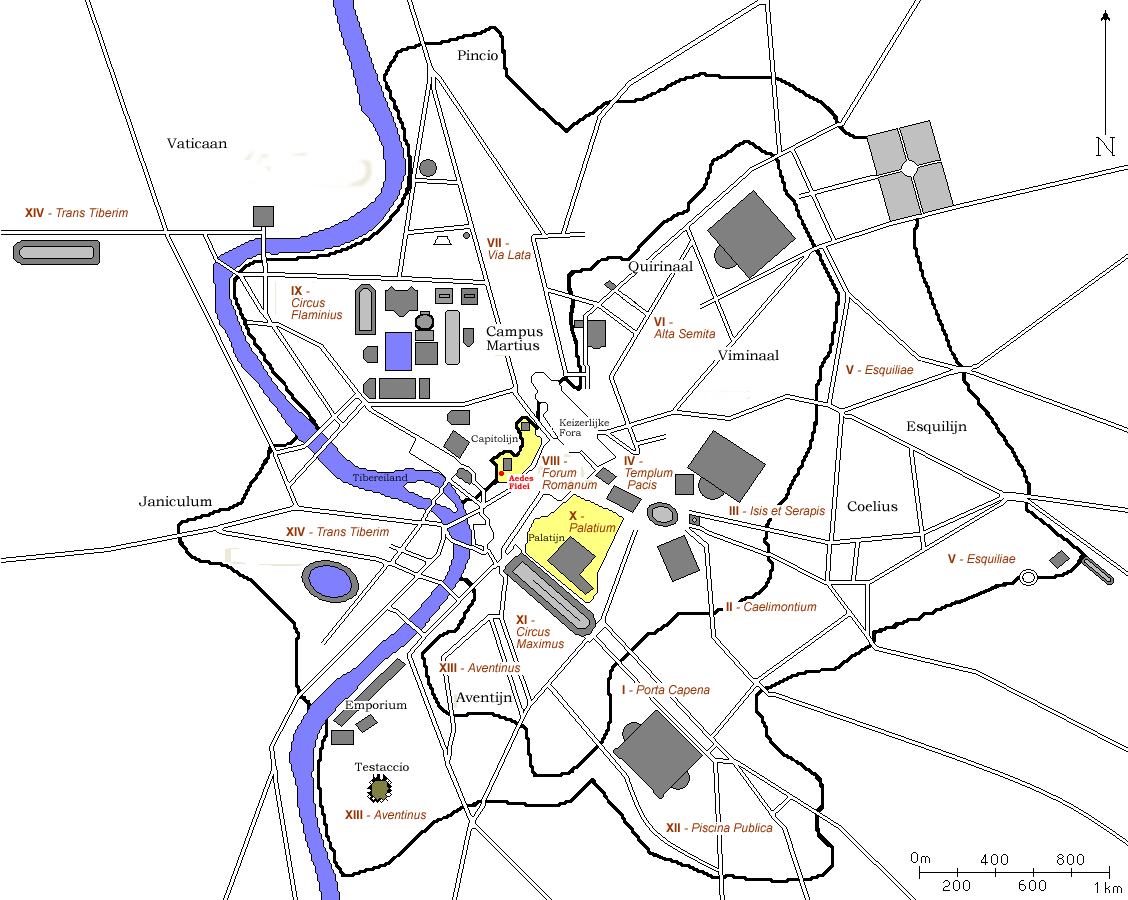
Location of Fides on a map of Ancient Rome

The Temple of Fides (Latin: aedes Fidei) was a minor temple on the Capitoline Hill in Rome. It was dedicated to Fides, the goddess of good faith, who was patron of diplomatic relations.

The temple was founded between 254 BC or 250 BC. It was on the southern part of the Area Capitolina, slightly to the south of the Temple of Ops, in a vast piazza in front of the Temple of Jupiter Optimus Maximus.

Remains found near the church of Sant'Omobono (including fragments of columns, part of a cement podium and a large female marble head, probably from a temple's acroterion) were previously identified as fragments of the Temple of Ops, but are now thought to be linked to the Temple of Faith, due to the nearby discovery of bilingual inscriptions in Greek and Latin and fragments of treaties between Asia Minor and the Roman Senate.

== See also ==
- List of Ancient Roman temples

== Bibliography ==
- Filippo Coarelli, Guida archeologica di Roma, Verona, Arnoldo Mondadori Editore, 1984.
- https://penelope.uchicago.edu/Thayer/E/Gazetteer/Places/Europe/Italy/Lazio/Roma/Rome/_Texts/PLATOP*/Aedes_Fidei.html
