= Circus Maximus =

Ancient Roman circus in Rome

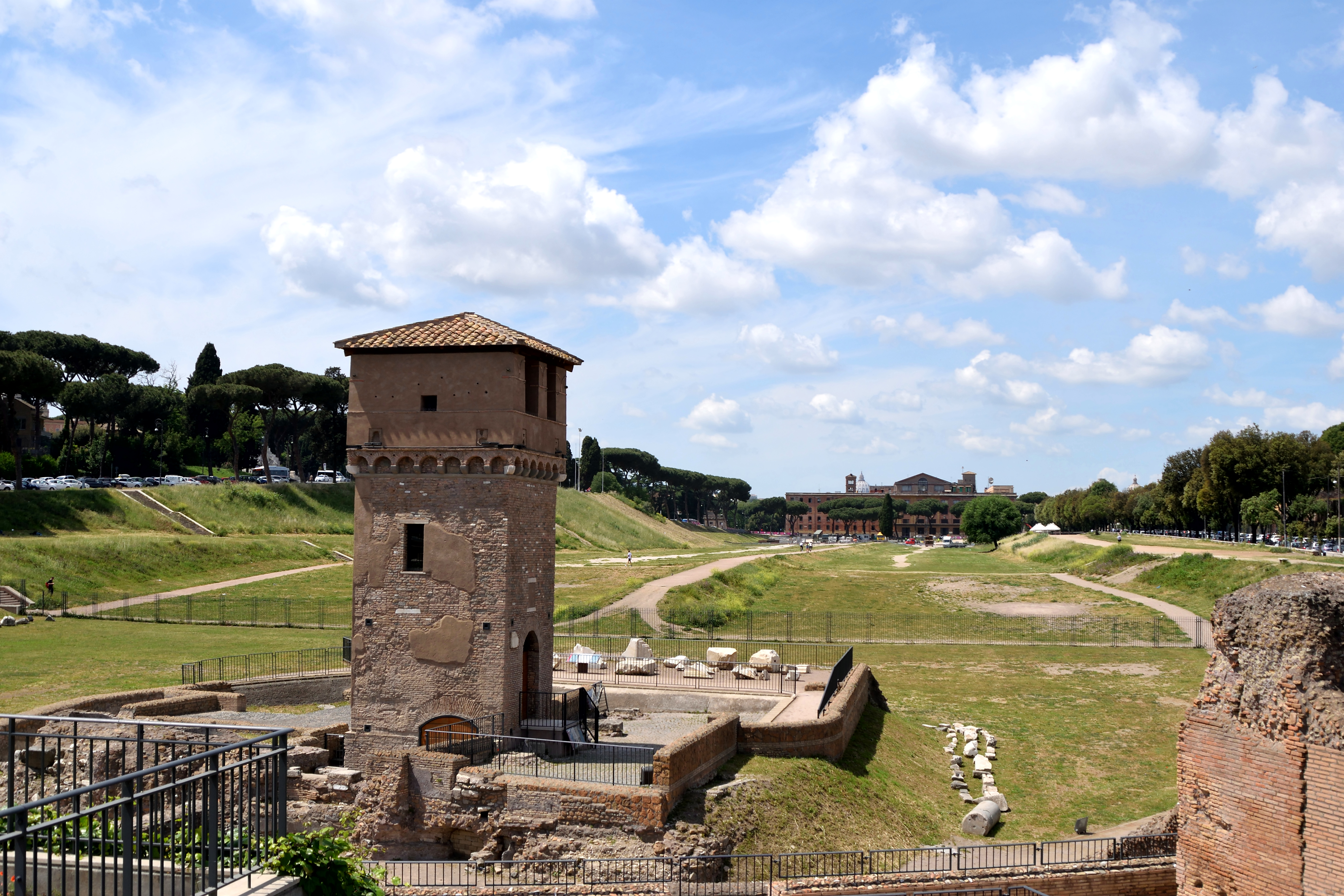
- View of the Circus site from the south-east. The tower in the foreground is part of a medieval fortification.

- Shown within Augustan Rome
- 41°53′09″N 12°29′09″E
- Type: Circus
- Location: Regio XI Circus Maximus

History
- Built: Old Kingdom era

The Circus Maximus (Latin for "largest circus"; Italian: Circo Massimo) is an ancient Roman chariot-racing stadium and mass entertainment venue in Rome, Italy. In the valley between the Aventine and Palatine hills, it was the first and largest stadium in ancient Rome and its later Empire. It measured 621 m (2,037 ft) in length and 118 m (387 ft) in width and could accommodate over 150,000 spectators. In its fully developed form, it became the model for circuses throughout the Roman Empire. The site is now a public park.

== Events and uses ==
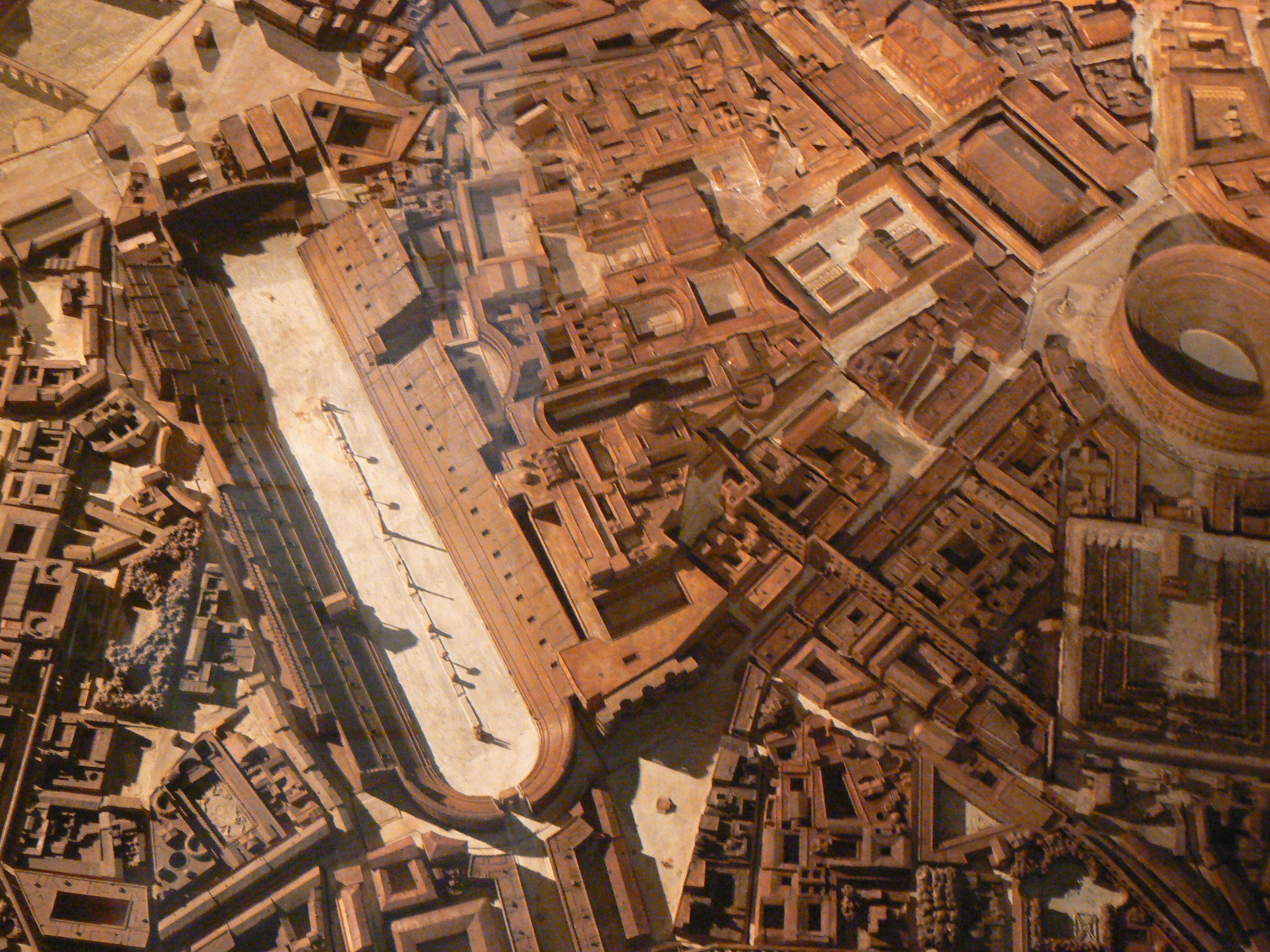
Model of Rome in the 4th century AD, by Paul Bigot. The Circus lies between the Aventine (left) and Palatine (right); the oval structure to the far right is the Colosseum.

The Circus was Rome's largest venue for ludi, public games connected to Roman religious festivals. Ludi were sponsored by leading Romans or the Roman state for the benefit of the Roman people (populus Romanus) and gods. Most were held annually or at annual intervals on the Roman calendar. Others might be given to fulfill a religious vow, such as the games in celebration of a triumph. In Roman tradition, the earliest triumphal ludi at the Circus were vowed by Tarquin the Proud to Jupiter in the late Regal era for his victory over Pometia.

Ludi ranged in duration and scope from one-day or even half-day events to spectacular multi-venue celebrations held over several days, with religious ceremonies and public feasts, horse and chariot racing, athletics, plays and recitals, beast-hunts and gladiator fights. Some included public executions. The greater ludi (meaning sport or game in Latin) at the Circus began with a flamboyant parade (pompa circensis), much like the triumphal procession, which marked the purpose of the games and introduced the participants.

During the Roman Republic, the aediles organized the games. The most costly and complex of the ludi offered opportunities to assess an aedile's competence, generosity, and fitness for higher office. Some Circus events, however, seem to have been relatively small and intimate affairs. In 167 BC, "flute players, scenic artists and dancers" performed on a temporary stage, probably erected between the two central seating banks. Others were enlarged at enormous expense to fit the entire space. A venatio held there in 169 BC, one of several in the 2nd century, employed "63 leopards and 40 bears and elephants", with spectators presumably kept safe by a substantial barrier.

As Rome's provinces expanded, existing ludi were embellished and new ludi invented by politicians who competed for divine and popular support. By the late Republic, ludi were held on 57 days of the year; an unknown number of these would have required full use of the Circus. On many other days, charioteers and jockeys would need to practise on its track. Otherwise, it would have made a convenient corral for the animals traded in the nearby Forum Boarium, just outside the starting gate. Beneath the outer stands, next to the Circus' entrances, were workshops and shops. When no games were being held, the Circus at the time of Catullus (mid-1st century BC) was probably "a dusty open space with shops and booths ... a colourful crowded disreputable area" frequented by "prostitutes, jugglers, fortune tellers and low-class performing artists".

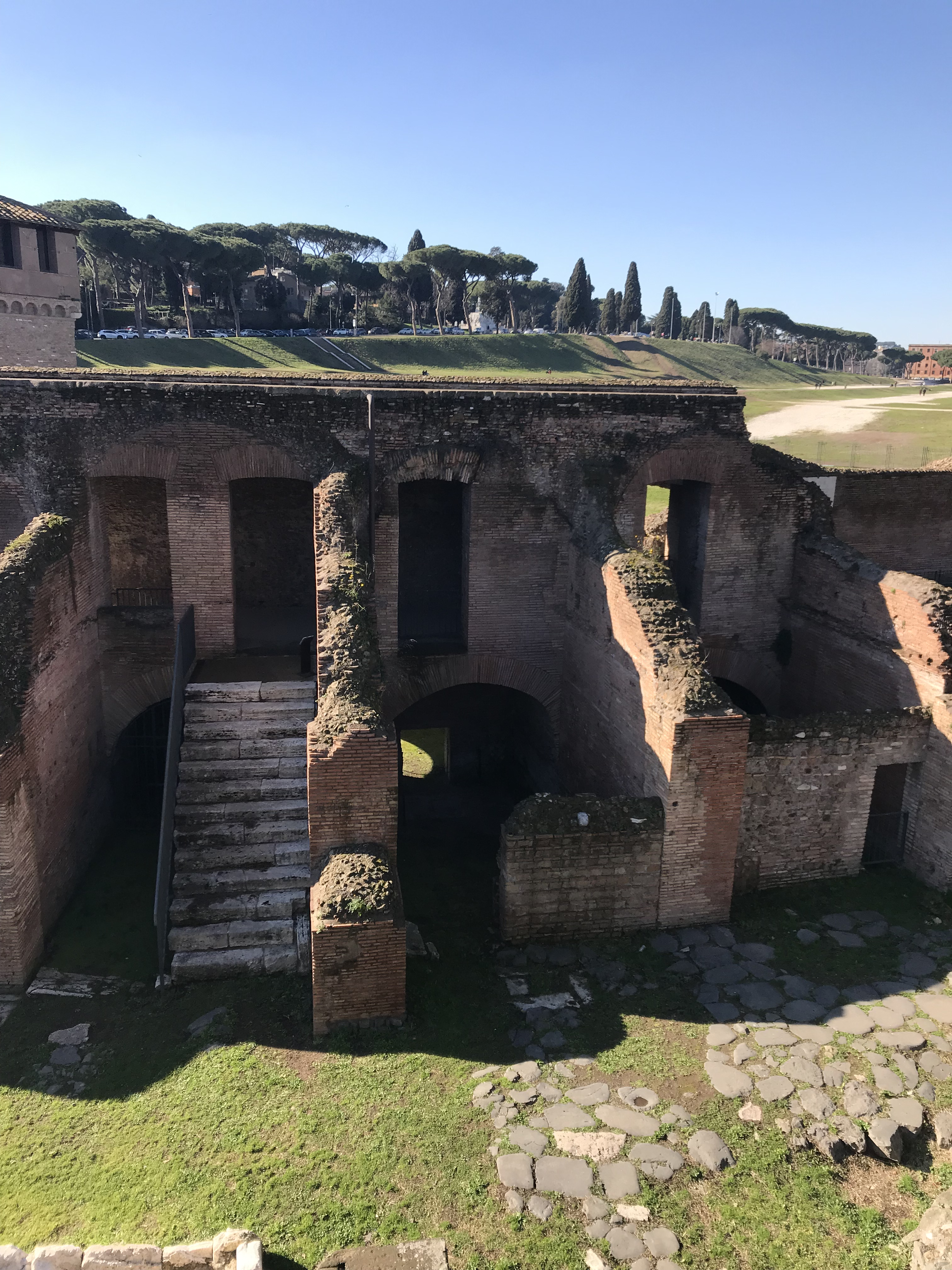
View of the Circus site from the south-east in 2019

Rome's emperors met the growing popular demand for regular ludi and the need for more specialised venues, as obligations of their office and cult. Over the centuries of its development, the Circus Maximus became Rome's paramount specialist venue for chariot races. By the late 1st century AD, the Colosseum had been built for most of the city's gladiator shows and smaller beast-hunts, and most track-athletes competed at the purpose-designed Stadium of Domitian, though long-distance foot races were still held at the Circus. Eventually, 135 days of the year were devoted to ludi.

Even at the height of its development as a chariot-racing circuit, the circus remained the most suitable space in Rome for religious processions on a grand scale and was the most popular venue for large-scale venationes; in the late 3rd century, the emperor Probus laid on a spectacular Circus show in which beasts were hunted through a veritable forest of trees, on a specially built stage. With the advent of Christianity as the official religion of the Empire, ludi gradually fell out of favour. The last known beast-hunt at the Circus Maximus took place in 523, and the last known races there were held by Totila in 549.

== Topography and construction ==
=== Regal era ===
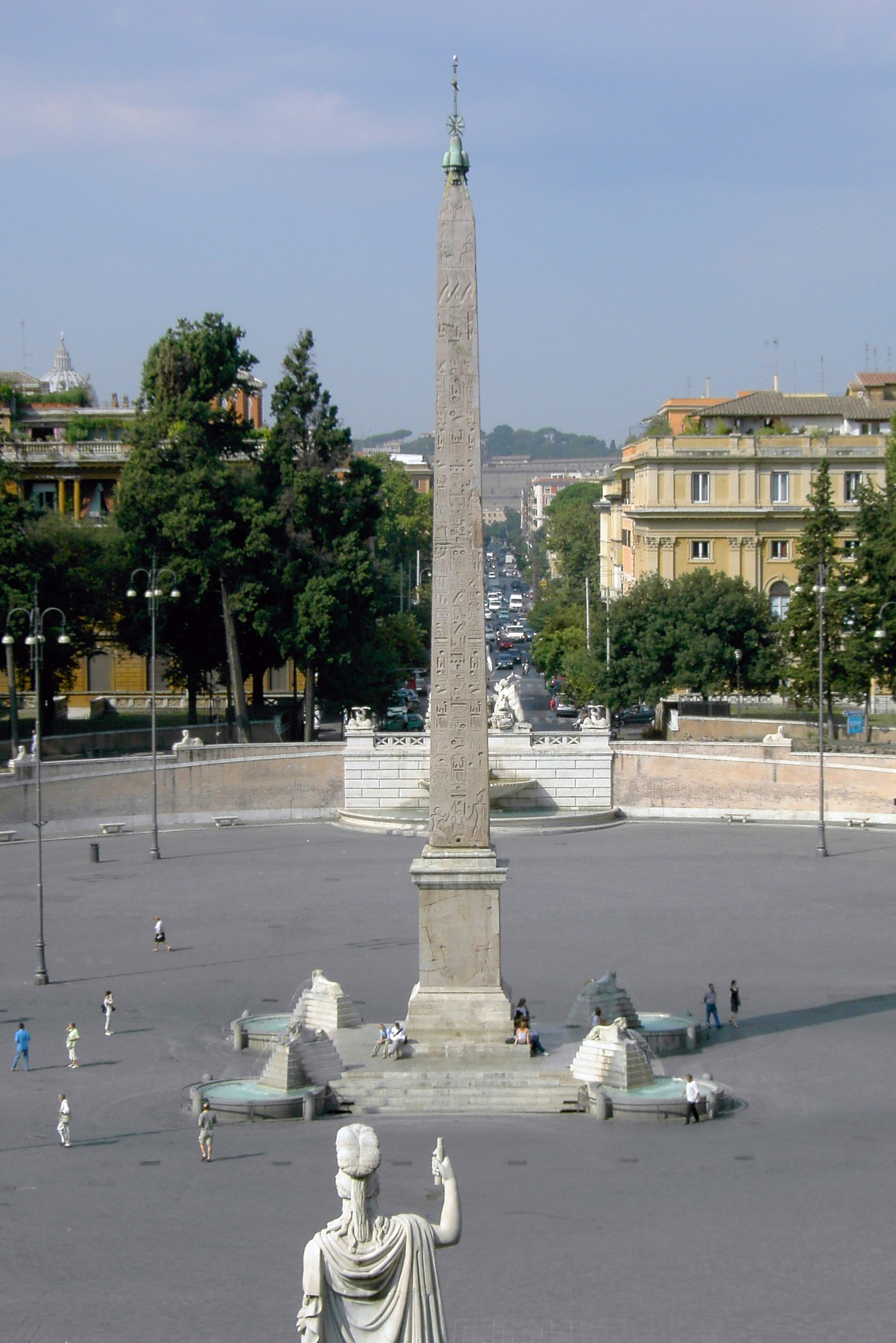
The Obelisco Flaminio, now in the Piazza del Popolo, was once part of the dividing barrier (spina) at the Circus Maximus

The Circus Maximus was sited on the level ground of the Valley of Murcia (Vallis Murcia), between Rome's Aventine and Palatine Hills. In Rome's early days, the valley would have been rich agricultural land, prone to flooding from the river Tiber and the stream which divided the valley lengthwise. The stream was probably bridged at an early date, at the two points where the track had to cross it, and the earliest races would have been held within an agricultural landscape, "with nothing more than turning posts, banks where spectators could sit, and some shrines and sacred spots".

In Livy's History of Rome, the first Etruscan king of Rome, Lucius Tarquinius Priscus, built raised, wooden perimeter seating at the Circus for Rome's highest echelons (the equites and patricians), probably midway along the Palatine straight, with an awning against the sun and rain. His grandson, Tarquinius Superbus, added the first seating for citizen-commoners (plebs, or plebeians), either adjacent or on the opposite, Aventine side of the track. Otherwise, the Circus was probably still little more than a trackway through surrounding farmland. By this time, it may have been drained but the wooden stands and seats would have frequently rotted and been rebuilt. The turning posts (metae), each made of three conical stone pillars, may have been the earliest permanent Circus structures; an open drainage canal between the posts would have served as a dividing barrier.

=== Republican era ===
The games' sponsor (Latin editor) usually sat beside the images of attending gods, on a conspicuous, elevated stand (pulvinar) but seats at the track's perimeter offered the best, most dramatic close-ups. In 494 BC (very early in the Republican era) the dictator Manius Valerius Maximus and his descendants were granted rights to a curule chair at the southeastern turn, an excellent viewpoint for the thrills and spills of chariot racing. In the 190s BC, stone track-side seating was built, exclusively for senators.

Permanent wooden starting stalls were built in 329 BC. They were gated, brightly painted, and staggered to equalise the distances from each start place to the central barrier. In theory, they might have accommodated up to 25 four-horse chariots (Quadrigas) abreast but when team-racing was introduced, they were widened, and their number reduced. By the late Republican or early Imperial era, there were twelve stalls. Their divisions were fronted by herms that served as stops for spring-loaded gates, so that twelve light-weight, four-horse or two-horse chariots could be simultaneously released onto the track. The stalls were allocated by lottery, and the various racing teams were identified by their colors, with the main two being the Blues and the Greens. Typically, there were seven laps per race. From at least 174 BC, they were counted off using large sculpted eggs. In 33 BC, an additional system of large bronze dolphin-shaped lap counters was added, positioned well above the central dividing barrier (euripus) for maximum visibility.

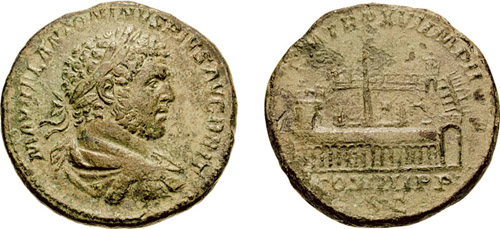
Sestertius depicting Caracalla, and the Circus Maximus, with Augustus' obelisk midway along the central dividing barrier (euripus or spina)

Julius Caesar's development of the Circus, commencing around 50 BC, extended the seating tiers to run almost the entire circuit of the track, barring the starting gates and a processional entrance at the semi-circular end. The track measured approximately 621 m (2,037 ft) in length and 150 m (490 ft) in breadth. A canal between the track perimeter and its seating protected spectators and help drain the track. The inner third of the seating formed a trackside cavea. Its front sections along the central straight were reserved for senators, and those immediately behind for equites. The outer tiers, two thirds of the total, were meant for Roman plebs and non-citizens. They were timber-built, with wooden-framed service buildings, shops and entrance-ways beneath. The total number of seats is uncertain, but was probably in the order of 150,000; Pliny the Elder's estimate of 250,000 seating places is unlikely. The wooden bleachers were damaged in a fire of 31 BC, either during or after construction.

=== Imperial era ===
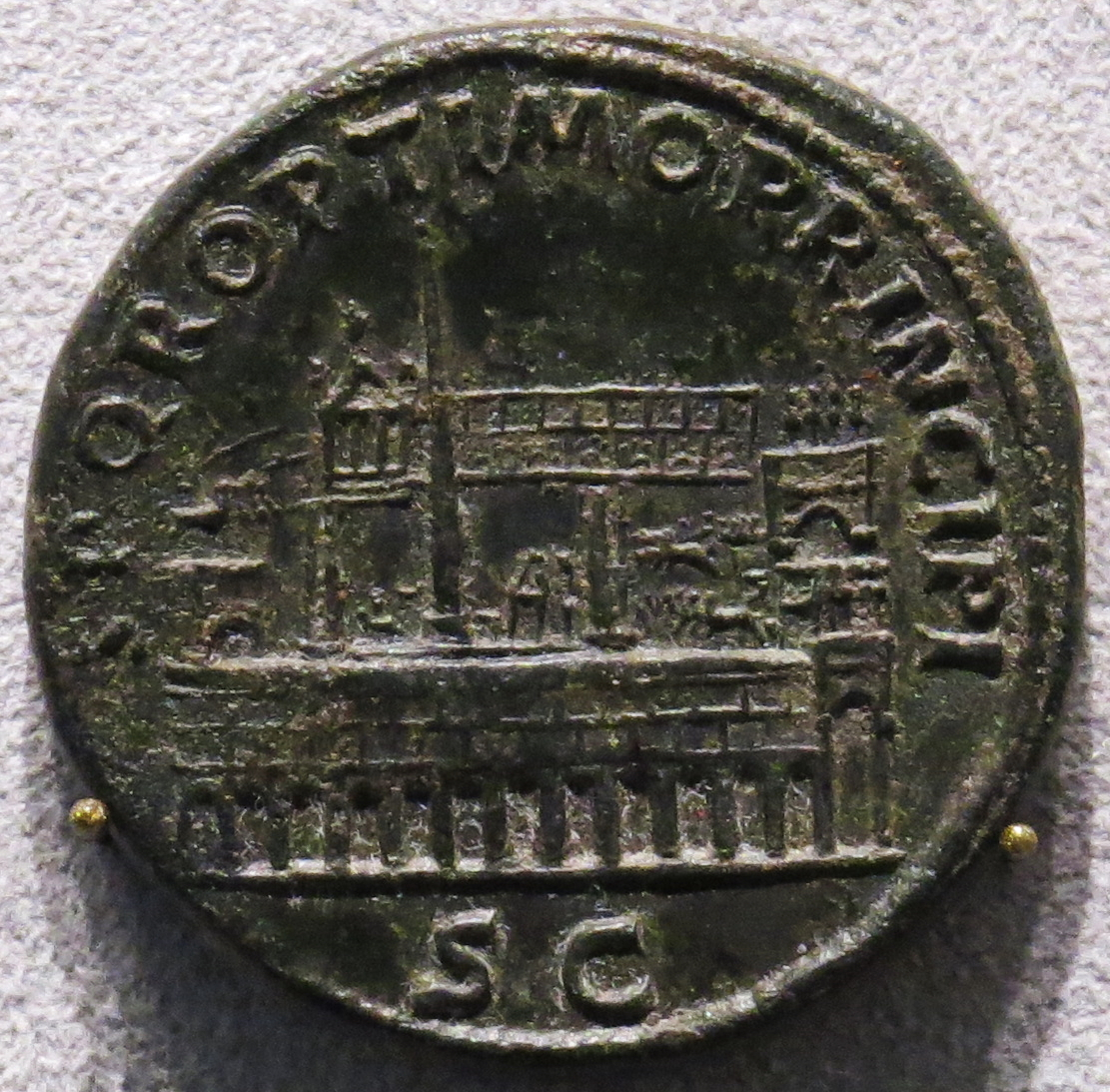
Sestertius of Trajan celebrating the restoration of the Circus Maximus (minted 103 AD).

The fire damage of 31 was probably repaired by Augustus (Caesar's successor and Rome's first emperor). He modestly claimed credit only for an obelisk and pulvinar at the site but both were major projects. Ever since its quarrying, long before Rome existed, the obelisk had been sacred to Egyptian Sun-gods. Augustus had it brought from Heliopolis at enormous expense, and erected midway along the dividing barrier of the Circus. It was Rome's first obelisk, an exotically sacred object and a permanent reminder of Augustus' victory over his Roman foes and their Egyptian allies in the recent civil wars. Thanks to him, Rome had secured both a lasting peace and a new Egyptian Province. The pulvinar was built on monumental scale, a shrine or temple (aedes) raised high above the trackside seats. Sometimes, while games were in progress, Augustus watched from there, alongside the gods. Occasionally, his family would join him there. This is the Circus described by Dionysius of Halicarnassus as "one of the most beautiful and admirable structures in Rome", with "entrances and ascents for the spectators at every shop, so that the countless thousands of people may enter and depart without inconvenience."

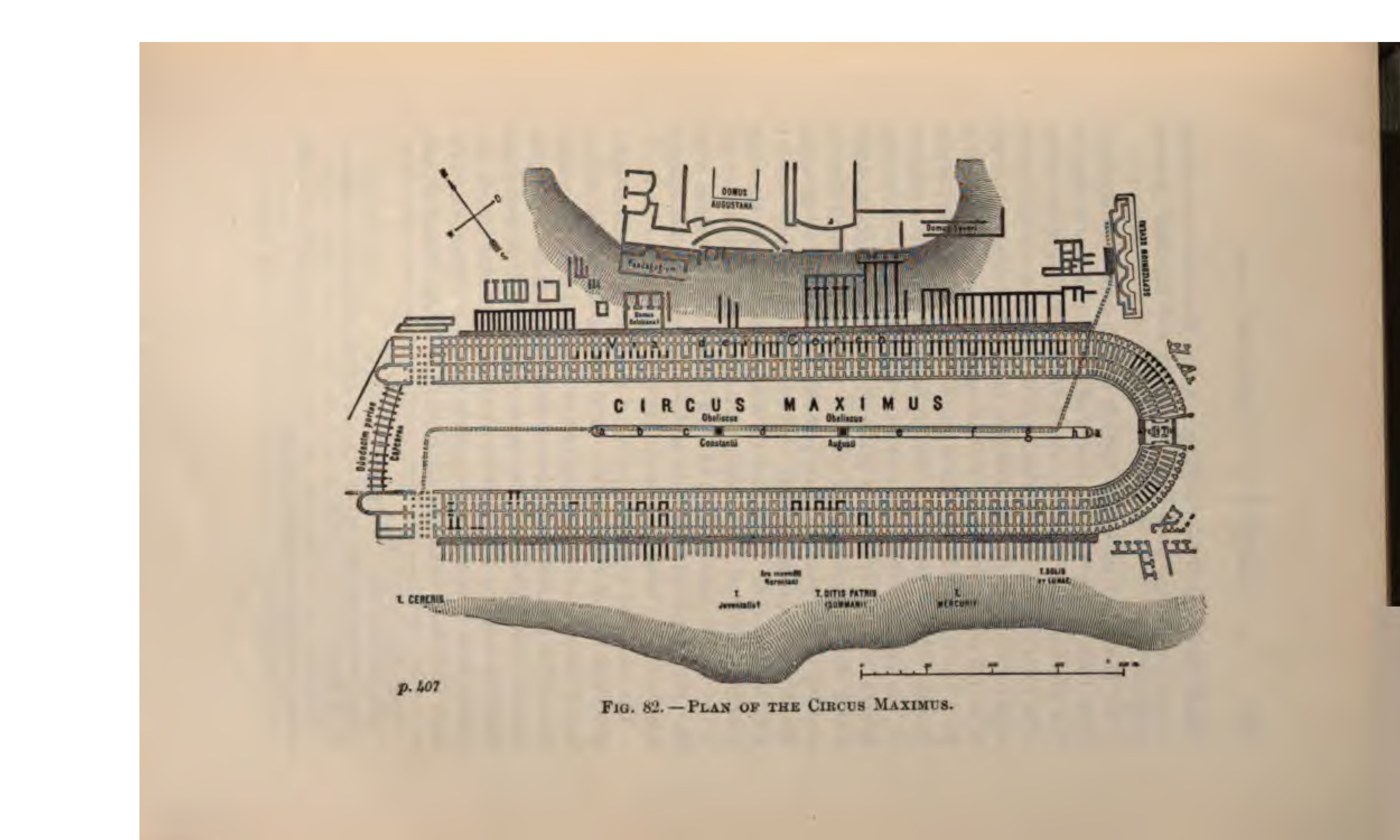
Groundplan of the Circus Maximus, according to Samuel Ball Platner, 1911. The staggered starting gates are to the left.

The site remained prone to flooding, probably through the starting gates, until Claudius made improvements there; they probably included an extramural anti-flooding embankment. Fires in the crowded, wooden perimeter workshops and bleachers were a far greater danger. A fire of 36 AD seems to have started in a basket-maker's workshop under the stands, on the Aventine side; the emperor Tiberius compensated various small businesses there for their losses. In AD 64, during Nero's reign, fire broke out at the semi-circular end of the Circus, swept through the stands and shops, and destroyed much of the city. Games and festivals continued at the Circus, which was rebuilt over several years to the same footprint and design.

By the late 1st century AD, the central dividing barrier comprised a series of water basins, or else a single watercourse open in some places and bridged over in others. It offered opportunities for artistic embellishment and decorative swagger, and included the temples and statues of various deities, fountains, and refuges for those assistants involved in more dangerous circus activities, such as beast-hunts and the recovery of casualties during races.

In AD 81 the Senate built a triple arch honoring Titus at the semi-circular end of the Circus, to replace or augment a former processional entrance. The emperor Domitian built a new, multi-storey palace on the Palatine, connected somehow to the Circus; he likely watched the games in autocratic style, from high above and barely visible to those below. Repairs to fire damage during his reign may already have been under way before his assassination.

The risk of further fire-damage, coupled with Domitian's fate, may have prompted Trajan's decision to rebuild the Circus entirely in stone, and provide a new pulvinar in the stands where Rome's emperor could be seen and honoured as part of the Roman community, alongside their gods. Under Trajan, the Circus Maximus found its definitive form, which was unchanged thereafter save for some monumental additions by later emperors, an extensive, planned rebuilding of the starting gate area under Caracalla, and repairs and renewals to existing fabric. Of these, Pliny claims that Trajan's works gained a further 5,000 seats. Some repairs were unforeseen and extensive, such as those carried out in Diocletian's reign, after the collapse of a seating section killed some 13,000 people.

== Religious significance ==
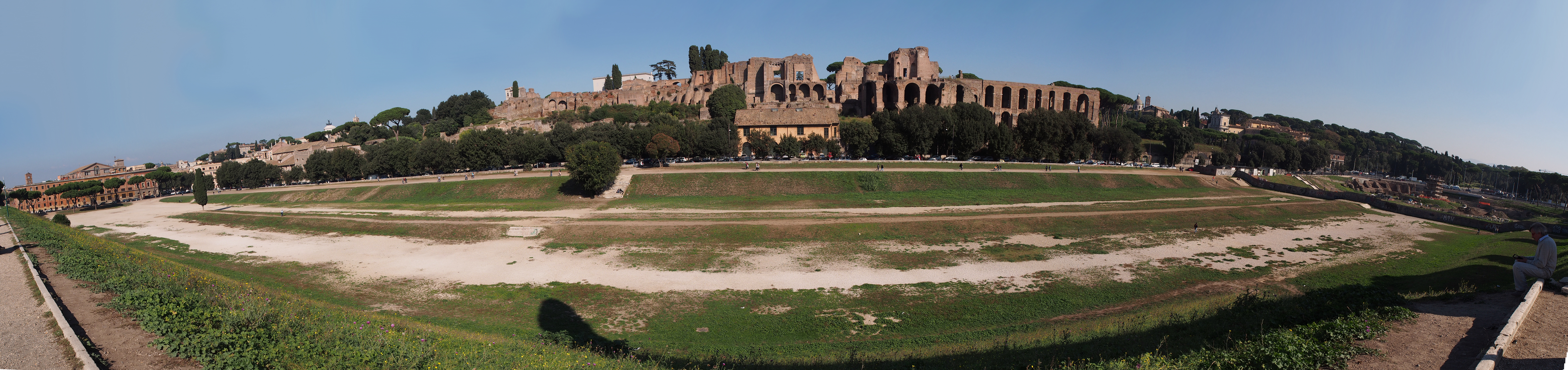
The Circus Maximus site and the Palatine Hill in the background

The southeastern turn of the track ran between two shrines which may have predated the Circus' formal development. One, at the outer southeast perimeter, was dedicated to the valley's eponymous goddess Murcia, an obscure deity associated with Venus, the myrtle shrub, a sacred spring, the stream that divided the valley, and the lesser peak of the Aventine Hill. The other was at the southeastern turning-post, where there was an underground shrine to Consus, a minor god of grain-stores, connected to the grain-goddess Ceres and to the underworld. According to Roman tradition, Romulus discovered this shrine shortly after the founding of Rome. He invented the Consualia festival, as a way of gathering his Sabine neighbours at a celebration that included horse-races and drinking. During these distractions, Romulus's men then abducted the Sabine daughters as brides. Thus the famous Roman myth of the Rape of the Sabine women had as its setting the Circus and the Consualia.

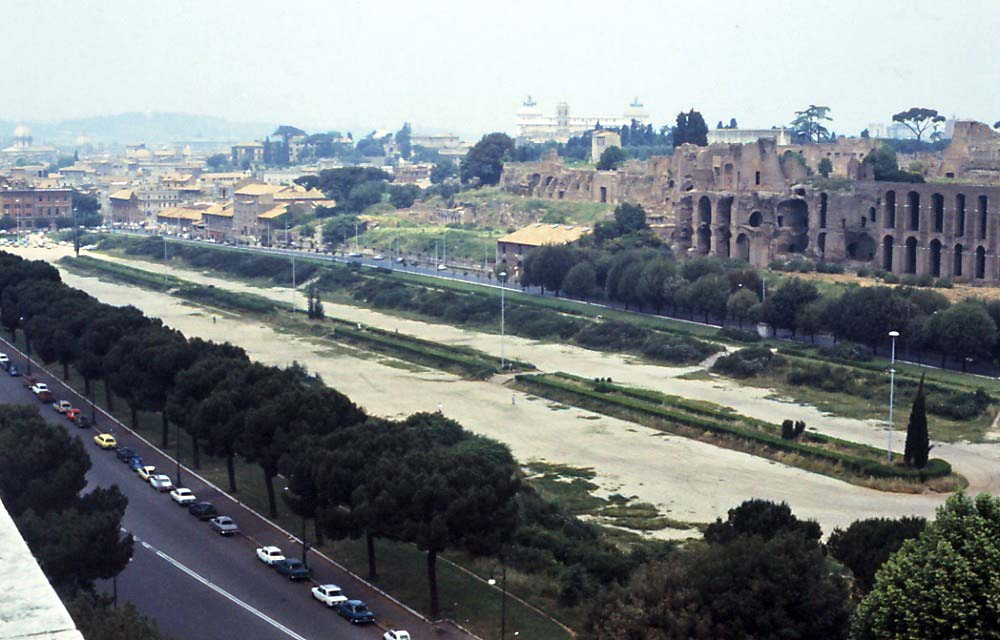
Circus Maximus., 1978

In this quasi-legendary era, horse or chariot races would have been held at the Circus site. The track width may have been determined by the distance between Murcia's and Consus' shrines at the southeastern end, and its length by the distance between these two shrines and Hercules' Ara Maxima, supposedly older than Rome itself and sited behind the Circus' starting place. The position of Consus' shrine at the turn of the track recalls the placing of shrines to Roman Neptune's Greek equivalent, Poseidon, in Greek hippodromes. In later developments, the altar of Consus, as one of the Circus' patron deities, was incorporated into the fabric of the south-eastern turning post. When Murcia's stream was partly built over, to form a dividing barrier (the spina or euripus) between the turning posts, her shrine was either retained or rebuilt. In the Late Imperial period, both the southeastern turn and the circus itself were sometimes known as Vallis Murcia. The symbols used to count race-laps also held religious significance; Castor and Pollux, who were born from an egg, were patrons of horses, horsemen, and the equestrian order (equites). Likewise, the later use of dolphin-shaped lap counters reinforced associations between the races, swiftness, and Neptune, as god of earthquakes and horses; the Romans believed dolphins to be the swiftest of all creatures. When the Romans adopted the Phrygian Great Mother as an ancestral deity, a statue of her on lion-back was erected within the circus, probably on the dividing barrier.

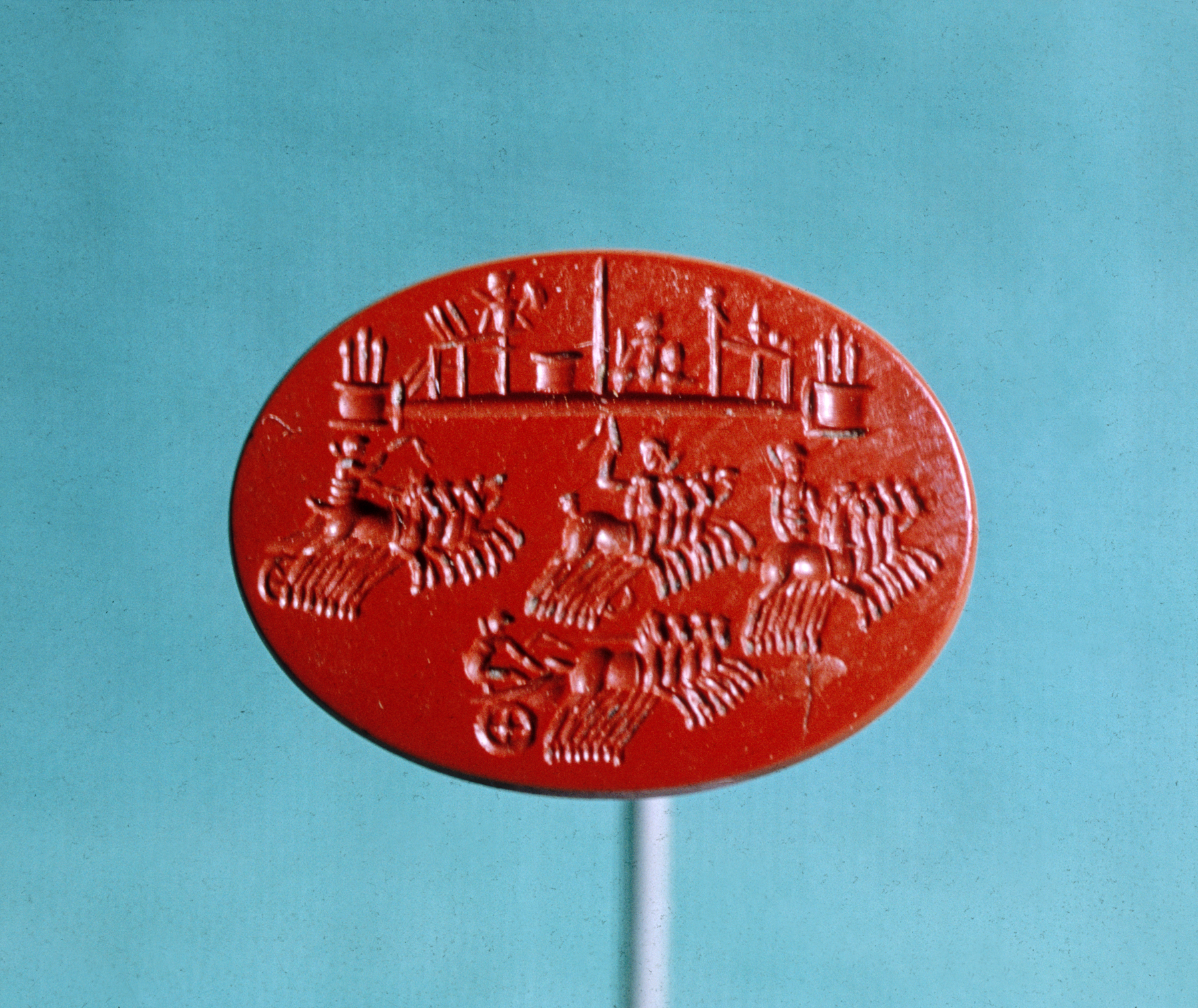
Jasper intaglio (2nd century AD) depicting chariot races, with the three-pointed metae at each end of the dividing barrier shown at top (Walters Art Museum)

Sun and Moon cults were probably represented at the Circus from its earliest phases. Their importance grew with the introduction of Roman cult to Apollo, and the development of Stoic and solar monism as a theological basis for the Roman Imperial cult. In the Imperial era, the Sun-god was divine patron of the Circus and its games. His sacred obelisk towered over the arena, set in the central barrier, close to his temple and the finishing line. The Sun-god was the ultimate, victorious charioteer, driving his four-horse chariot (quadriga) through the heavenly circuit from sunrise to sunset. His partner Luna drove her two-horse chariot (biga); together, they represented the predictable, orderly movement of the cosmos and the circuit of time, which found analogy in the Circus track. Luna's temple, which was probably built long before Apollo's, burned down in the Great Fire of 64 AD and was probably not replaced. Her cult was closely identified with that of Diana, who seems to have been represented in the processions that started Circus games, and with Sol, usually identified as her brother. After the loss of her temple, her cult may have been transferred to Sol's temple on the dividing barrier, or one beside it; both would have been open to the sky.

Temples to several deities overlooked the Circus; most are now lost. The temples to Ceres and Flora stood close together on the Aventine, more or less opposite the Circus' starting gate, which remained under Hercules' protection. Further southeast along the Aventine was a temple to Luna, the moon goddess. Aventine temples to Venus Obsequens, Mercury and Dis (or perhaps Summanus) stood on the slopes above the southeast turn. On the Palatine hill, opposite to Ceres's temple, stood the temple to Magna Mater and, more or less opposite Luna's temple, one to the sun-god Apollo.

Several festivals, some of uncertain foundation and date, were held at the Circus in historical times. The Consualia, with its semi-mythical establishment by Romulus, and the Cerealia, the major festival of Ceres, were probably older than the earliest historically attested "Roman Games" (Ludi Romani) held at the Circus in honour of Jupiter in 366 BC. In the early Imperial era, Ovid describes the opening of Cerealia (mid to late April) with a horse race at the Circus, followed by the nighttime release of foxes into the stadium, their tails ablaze with lighted torches. Some early connection is likely between Ceres as goddess of grain crops and Consus as a god of grain storage and patron of the Circus.

== Modern status and uses ==
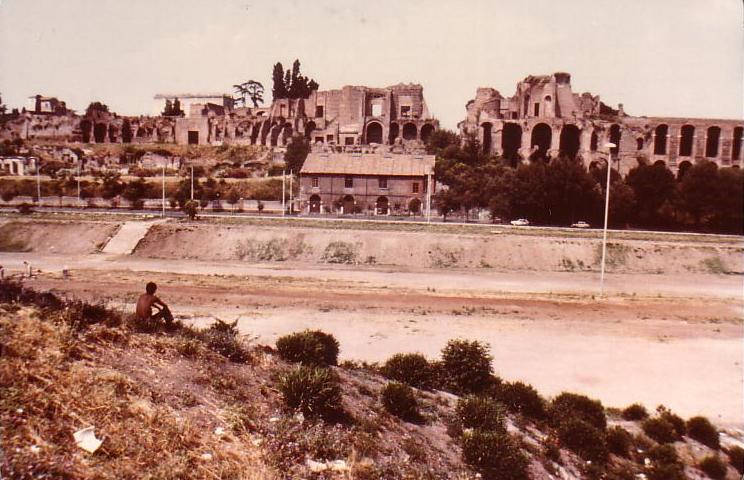
Ruins overlooking the Circus Maximus, seen from the Aventine (1983)

After the 6th century, the Circus fell into disuse and decay. The lower levels, ever prone to flooding, were gradually buried under waterlogged alluvial soil and accumulated debris, so that the original track is now buried six meters beneath the modern surface. In the 11th century, the Circus was "replaced by dwellings rented out by the congregation of Saint-Guy." In the 12th century, a watercourse was dug there to drain the soil, and by the 16th century the area was used as a market garden. During the renaissance, the site was one of many used as a convenient quarry for good quality building stone. Many of the Circus's standing structures survived these changes; in 1587, two obelisks were removed from the central barrier by Pope Sixtus V, and one of these was re-sited at the Piazza del Popolo. In 1852, a gas works was built on the site by the Anglo-Italian Gas Society. It remained in site until 1910 when it was relocated to the edge of Rome. Mid-19th century workings at the circus site uncovered the lower parts of a seating tier and outer portico. Since then, a series of excavations has exposed further sections of the seating, curved turn and central barrier but further exploration has been limited by the scale, depth and waterlogging of the site.

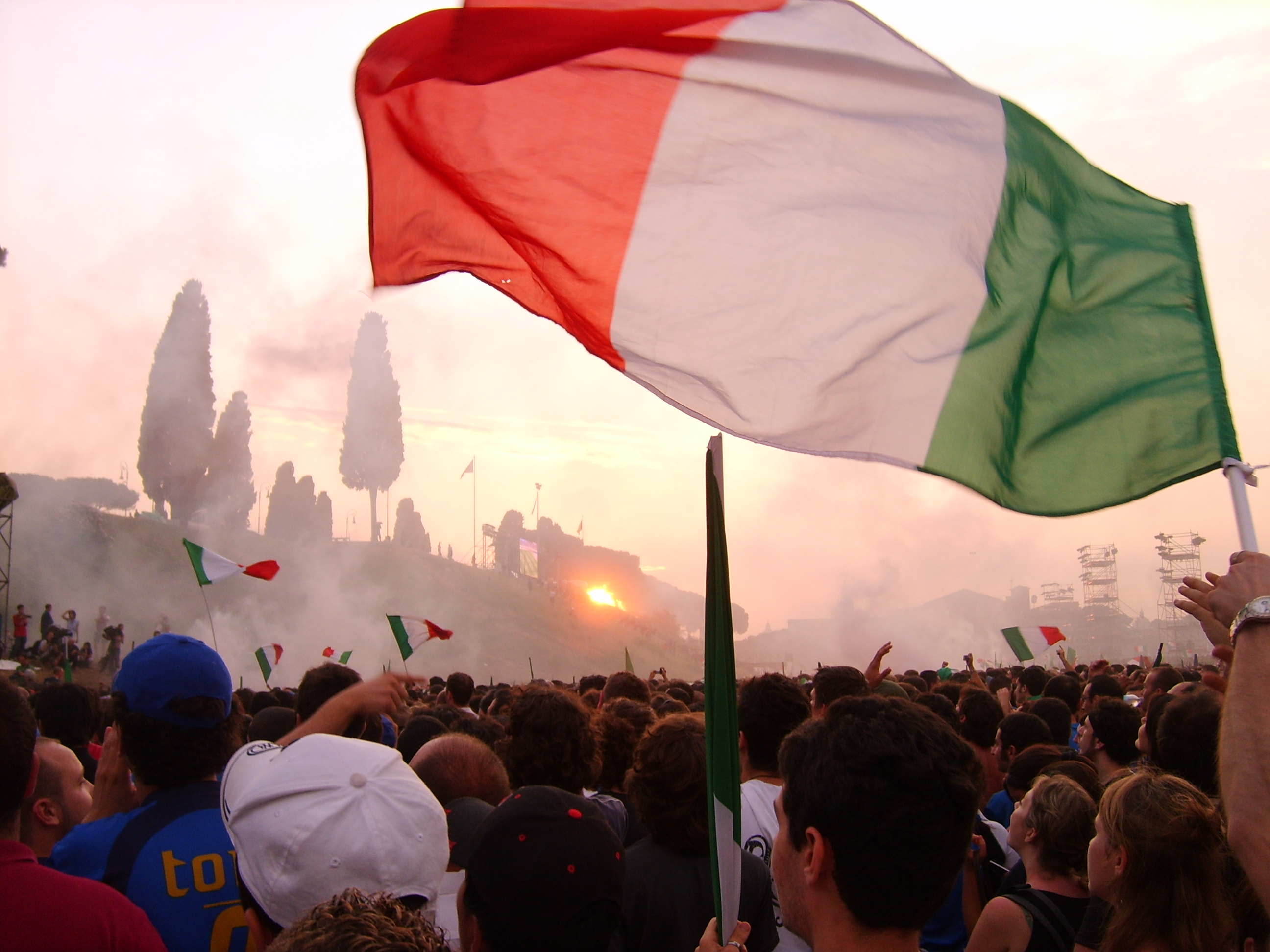
Italian World Cup 2006 victory celebration at the site of the Circus

The Circus site now functions as a large park area, open to the public and often used for concerts, meetings, and celebrations.

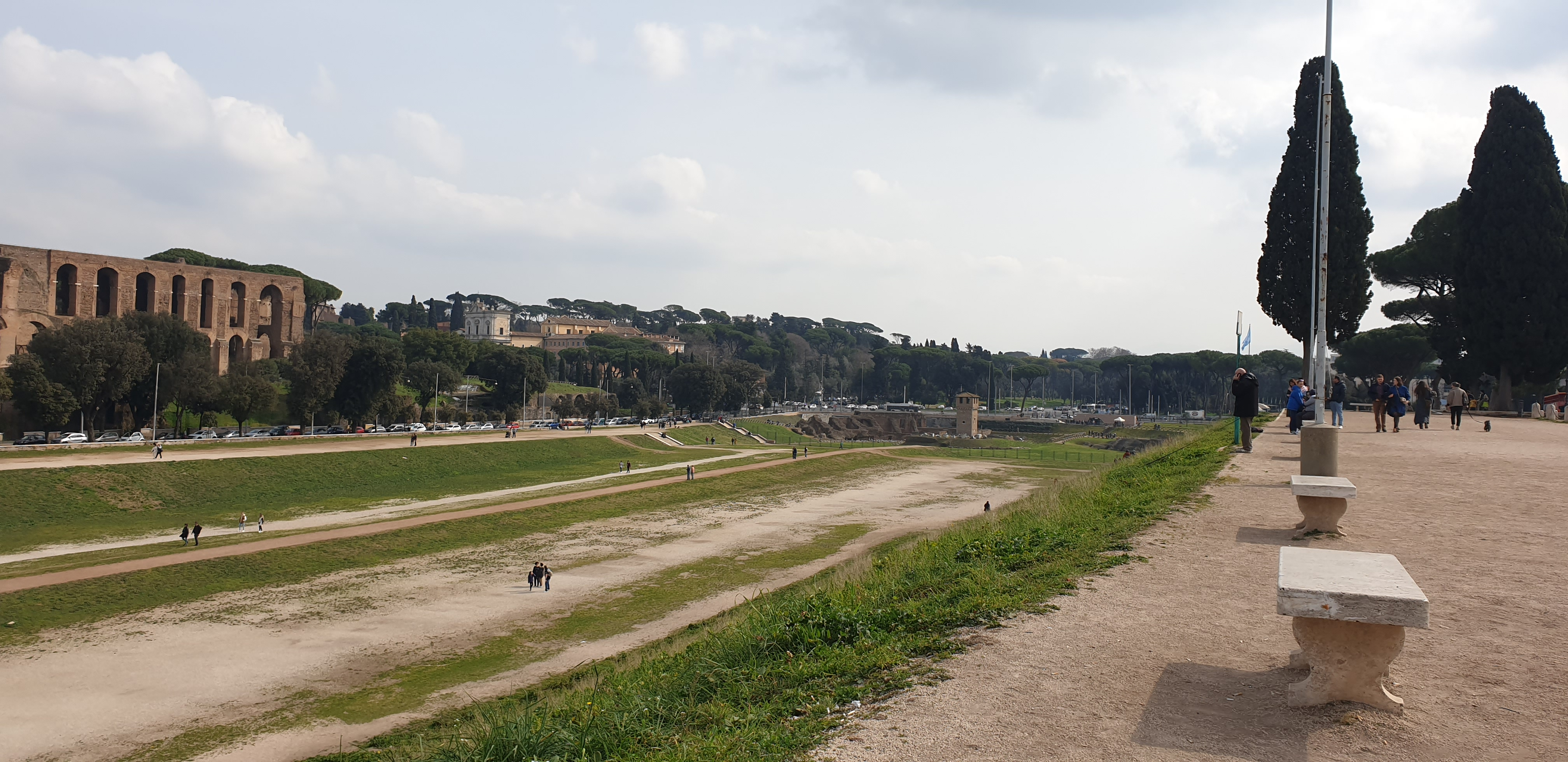
Circus Maximus site, 2023

== See also ==
- Circus of Maxentius
- Stadium of Domitian
- Amphitheatre
- Forma Urbis Romae
- List of closed stadia by capacity
- Hippodrome of Constantinople

Preceded by Tabularium	Landmarks of Rome; Circus Maximus	Succeeded by Circus of Maxentius
