= Consualia =

Ancient Roman festivals in honor of Consus

- Official name: Consuales Ludi
- Observed by: Roman Republic, Roman Empire
- Type: Ancient Roman
- Celebrations: Chariot racing
- Observances: Horses, Mules and Asses were adorned with garlands
- Date: 21 August, 15 December

The Consualia or Consuales Ludi was the name of two ancient Roman festivals in honor of Consus, a tutelary deity of the harvest and stored grain. Consuales Ludi harvest festivals were held on August 21, and again on December 15, in connection with grain storage. The shrine of Consus was underground, it was covered with earth all year and was only uncovered for this one day. Mars, the god of war, as a protector of the harvest, was also honored on this day, as were the Lares, the household gods that individual families held sacred.

During the celebration horses, mules, and asses were exempted from all labour, and were led through the streets adorned with garlands and flowers. Chariot races were held this day in the Circus Maximus, which included an odd race in which chariots were pulled by mules.

In Roman mythology, the Consualia was founded by Romulus as an occasion to gather his Sabine neighbors. When the community was assembled and in a state of drunken festivity, Romulus's men abducted the daughters of the Sabines to become their brides (see "The Rape of the Sabine Women").

There were also sacrifices to Consus on 7 July. Consus' feasts were followed by those of the related goddess Ops: the Opiconsivia on 25 August and the Opalia on 19 December.

According to Livy, the festival honors Neptune.
