= Fibula (brooch) =

Ancient pin or brooch for securing clothing

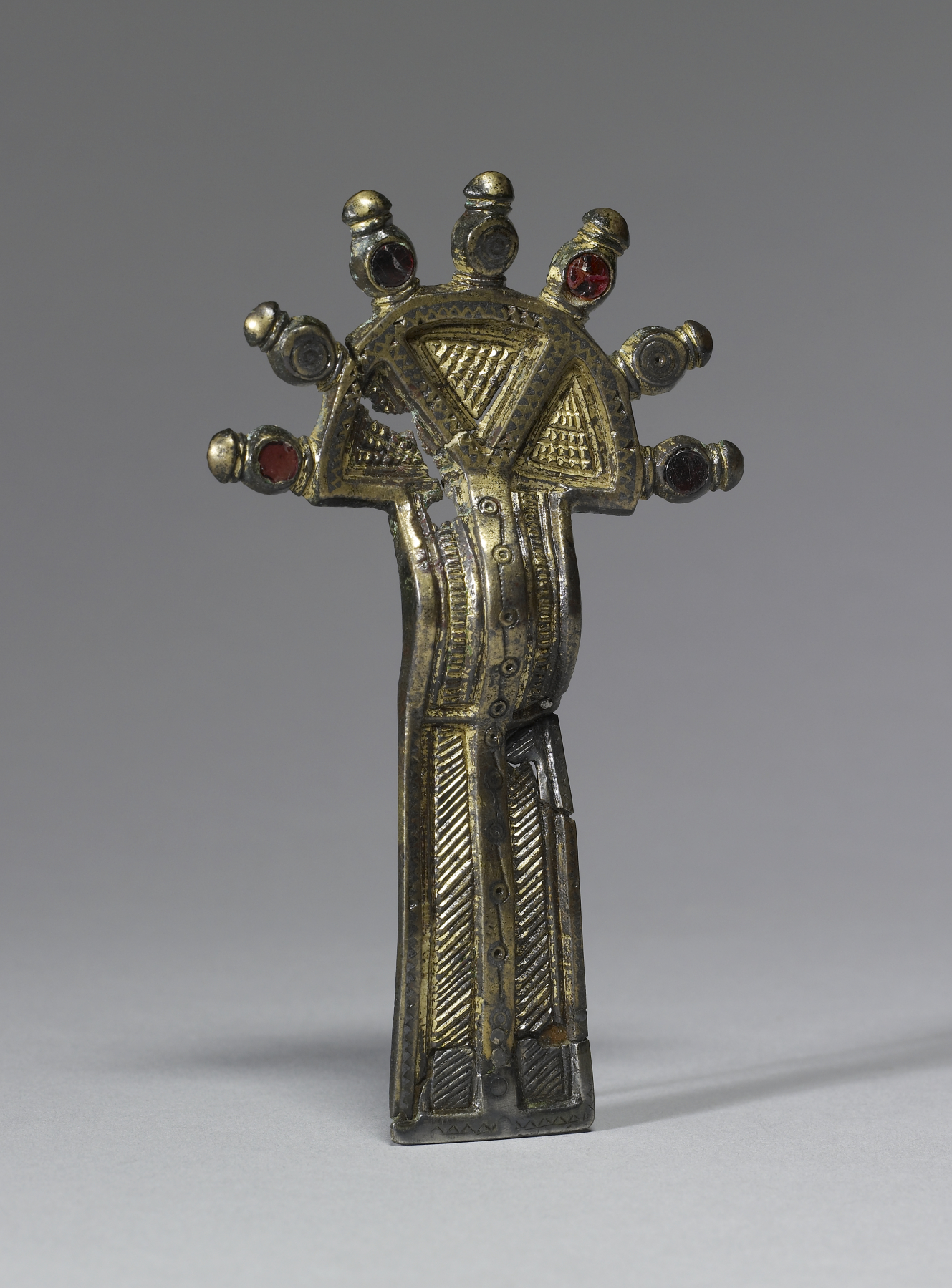
A 6th century bow fibula found in north-eastern France and the German Rhineland. They were worn by Frankish noblewomen in pairs at the shoulder or as belt ornaments.

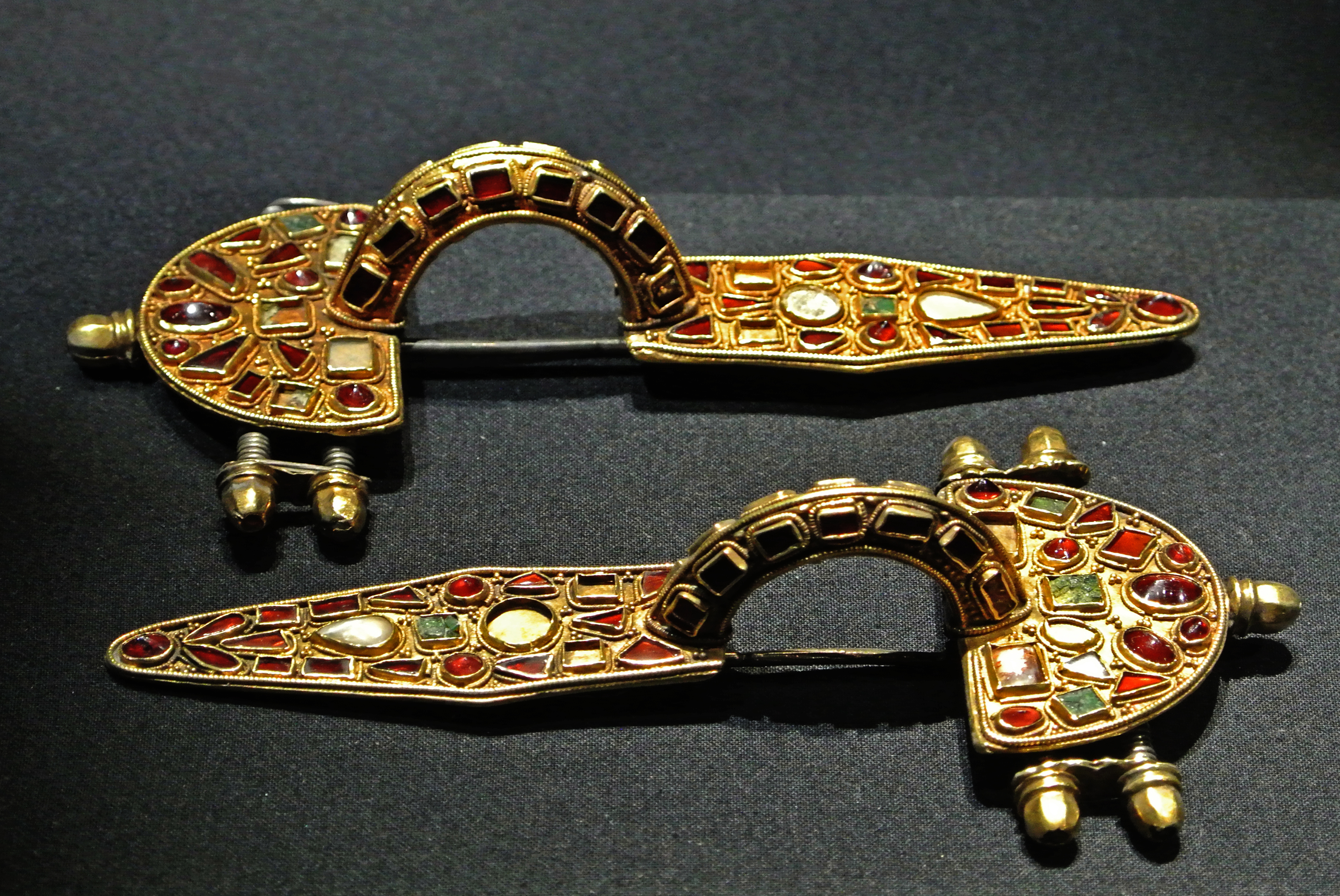
Germanic fibulæ, early 5th century, Kunsthistorisches Museum, Vienna

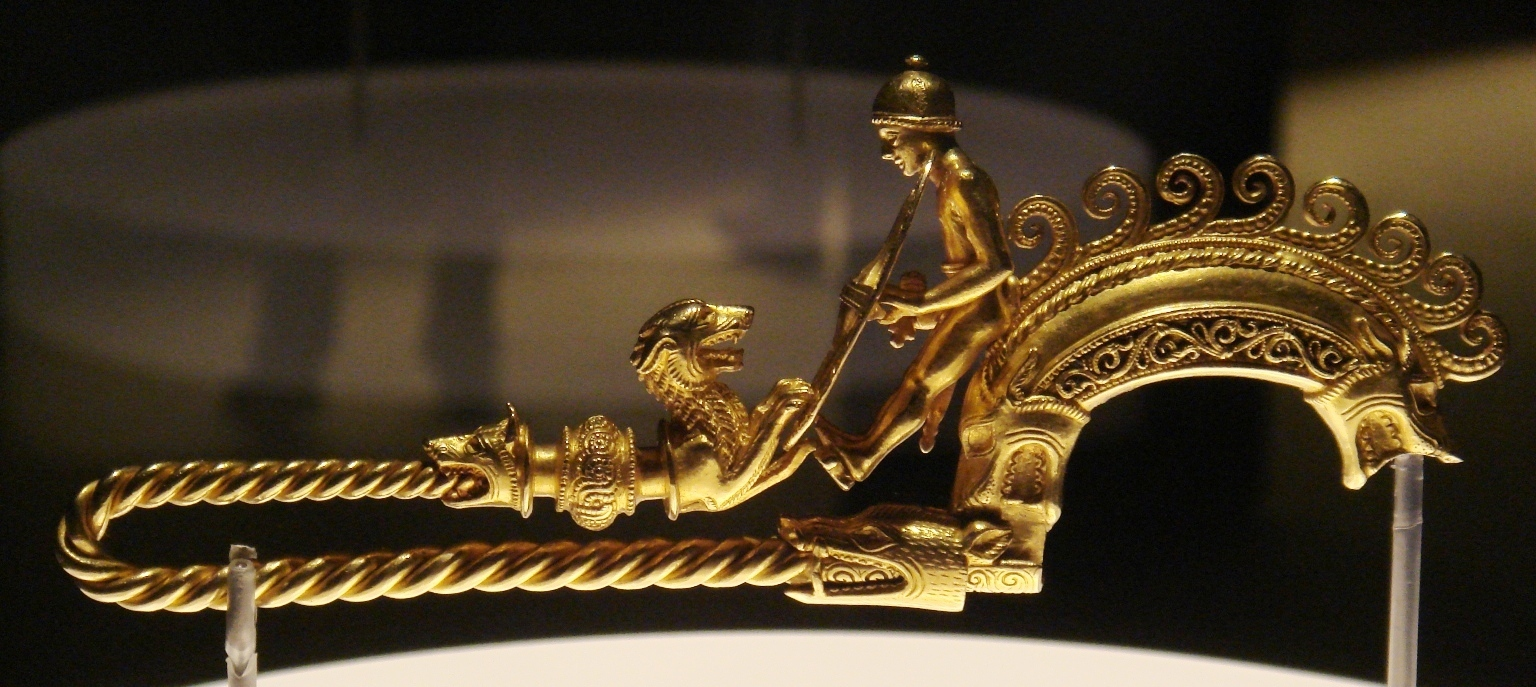
Hellenistic Greek Braganza Brooch, 250–200 BC, British Museum, London

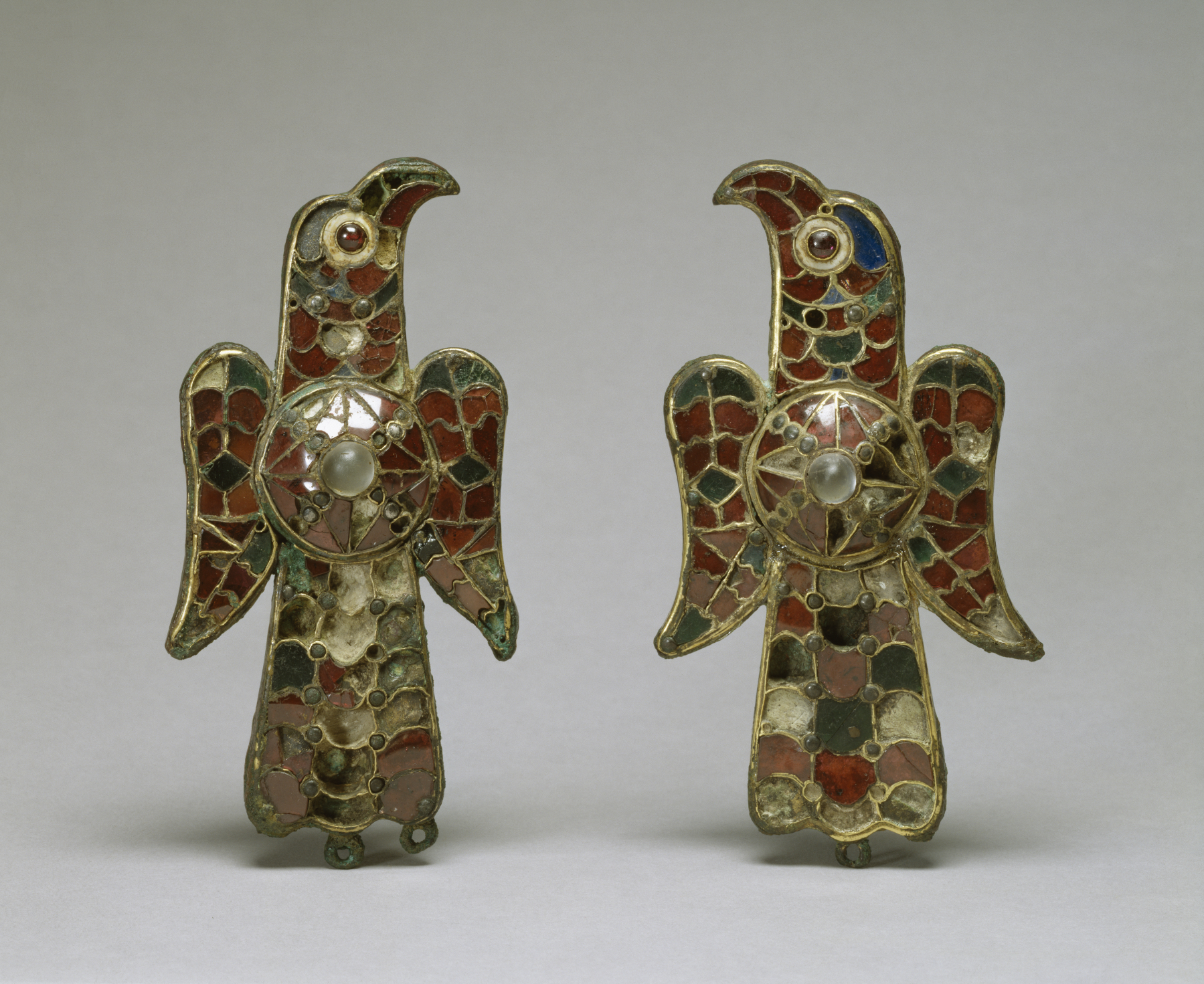
Visigothic eagle-shaped fibulae, 6th century, found at Tierra de Barros, Spain, made of sheet gold over bronze, Walters Art Museum, Baltimore.

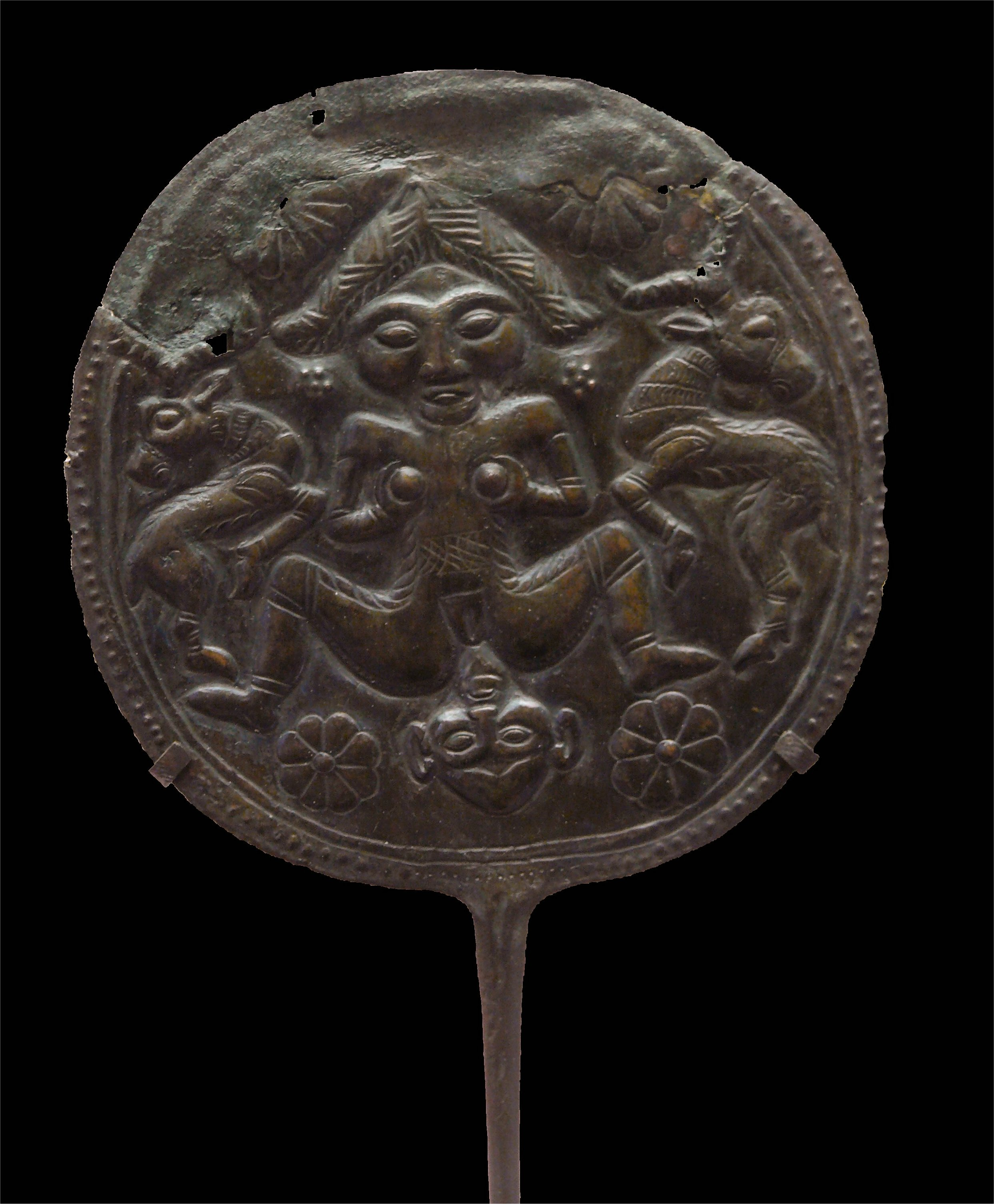
Luristan bronze fibula showing a woman giving birth flanked by two antelopes, ornamented with flowers, found in Iran, 1000 to 650 BC, Louvre museum, Paris

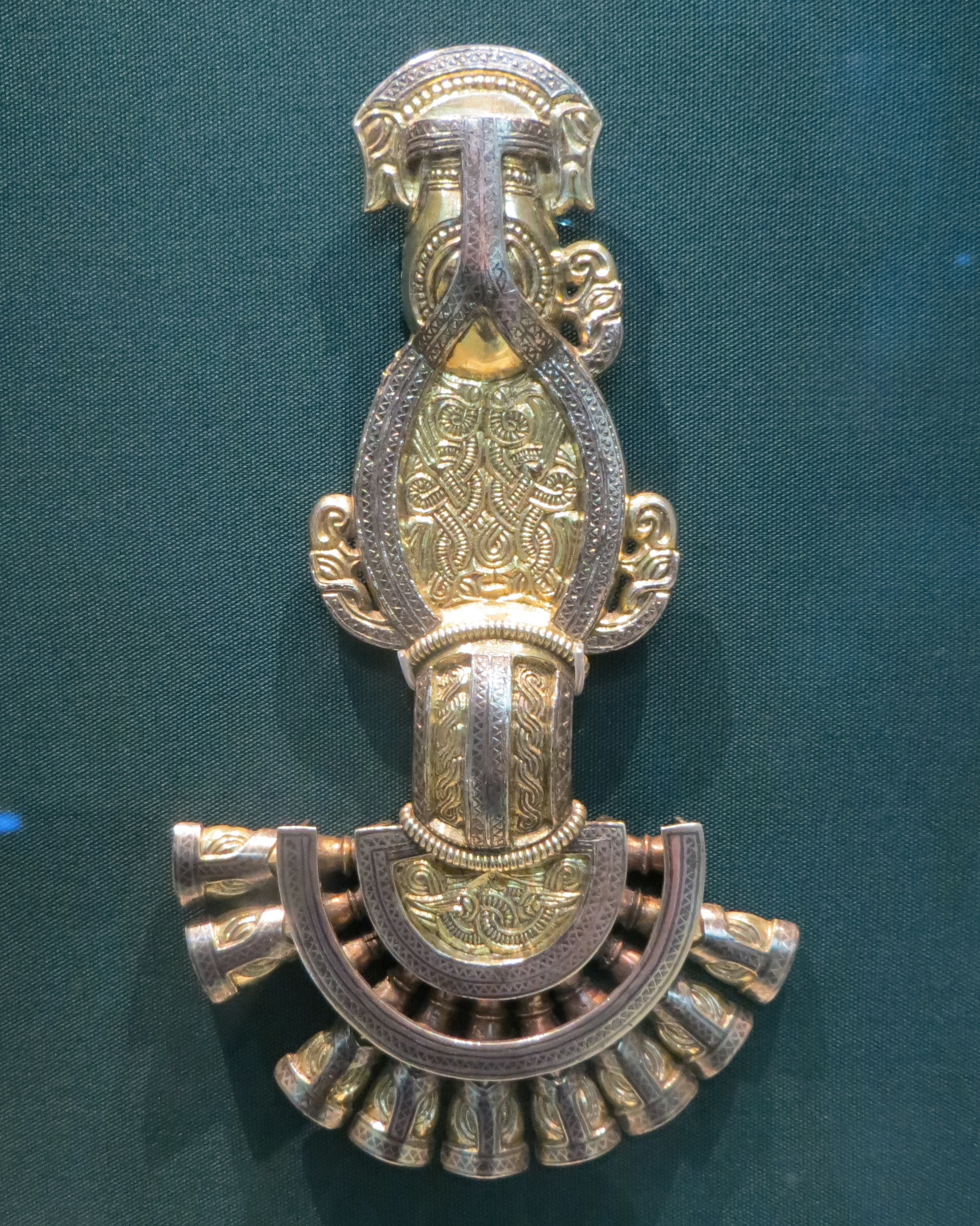
Lombardic gilded silver brooch from Tuscany, c. AD 600, one of the largest of its kind, British Museum, London

A fibula (/ˈfɪbjʊlə/, pl.: fibulae /ˈfɪbjʊli/) is a brooch or pin for fastening garments, typically at the right shoulder. The fibula developed in a variety of shapes, but all were based on the safety-pin principle. Unlike most modern brooches, fibulae were not only decorative; they originally served a practical function: to fasten clothing for both sexes, such as dresses and cloaks.

In English, "fibula" is a word not used for modern jewellery, but by archaeologists, who also use "brooch", especially for types other than the ancient "safety pin" types, and for types from the British Isles. For Continental archaeologists, all metal jewellery clothes-fasteners are usually "fibulae".

There are hundreds of different types of fibulae. They are usually divided into families that are based upon historical periods, geography, and/or cultures. Fibulae are also divided into classes that are based upon their general forms. Fibulae replaced straight pins that were used to fasten clothing in the Neolithic period and the Bronze Age. In turn, fibulae were replaced as clothing fasteners by buttons in the Middle Ages. Their descendant, the modern safety pin, remains in use today.

In ancient Rome and other places where Latin was used, the same word denoted both a brooch and the fibula bone because a popular form for brooches and the shape of the bone were thought to resemble one another. Some fibulae were also sometimes used as votive gifts for gods.

Lost fibulae, usually fragments, are frequently dug up by amateur coin and relic hunters using metal detectors. While intact fibulae are more frequently found preserved in tombs or ancient burial sites. The fibulae found in tombs tend to be made of precious materials used as a form of jewelry on top of its practical use.

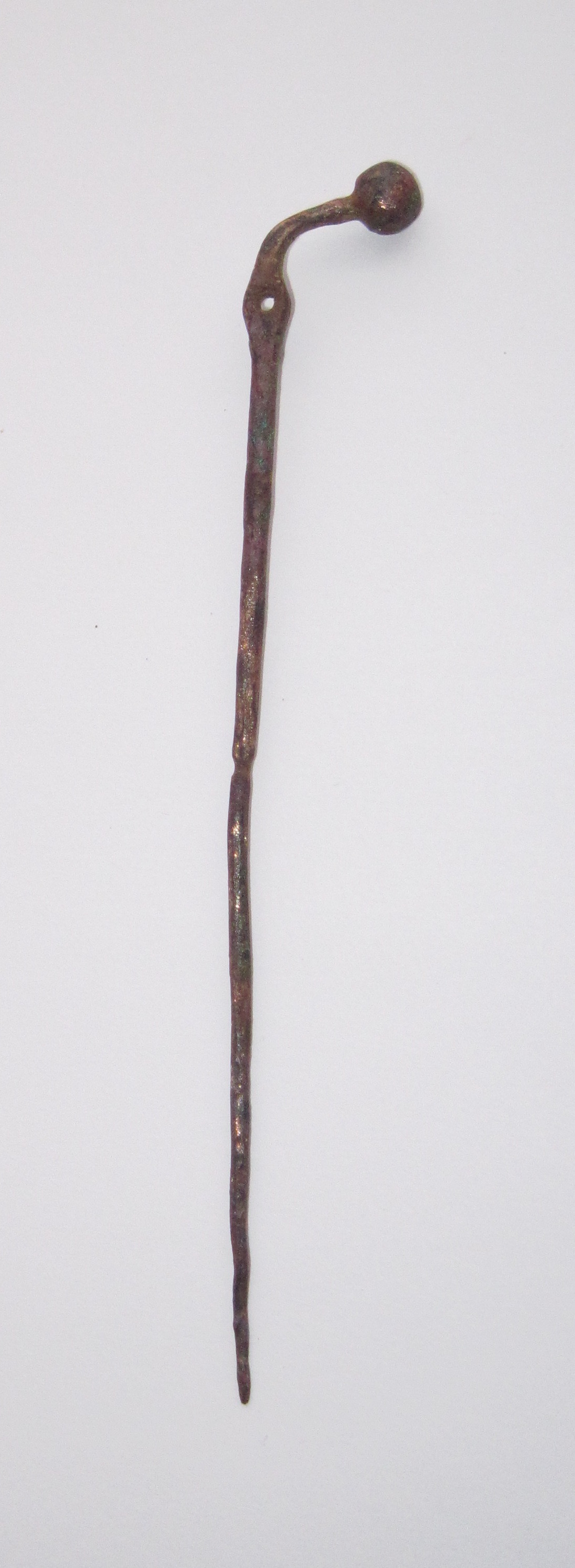
A cloak pin

== Construction ==
Most fibulae are made of bronze (more properly "copper alloy") or iron, or both. Some fibulae are made of precious metals such as silver or gold. Most fibulae are made of only one or two pieces. Many fibulae are decorated with enamel, semi-precious stones, glass, coral or bone.

== Components ==
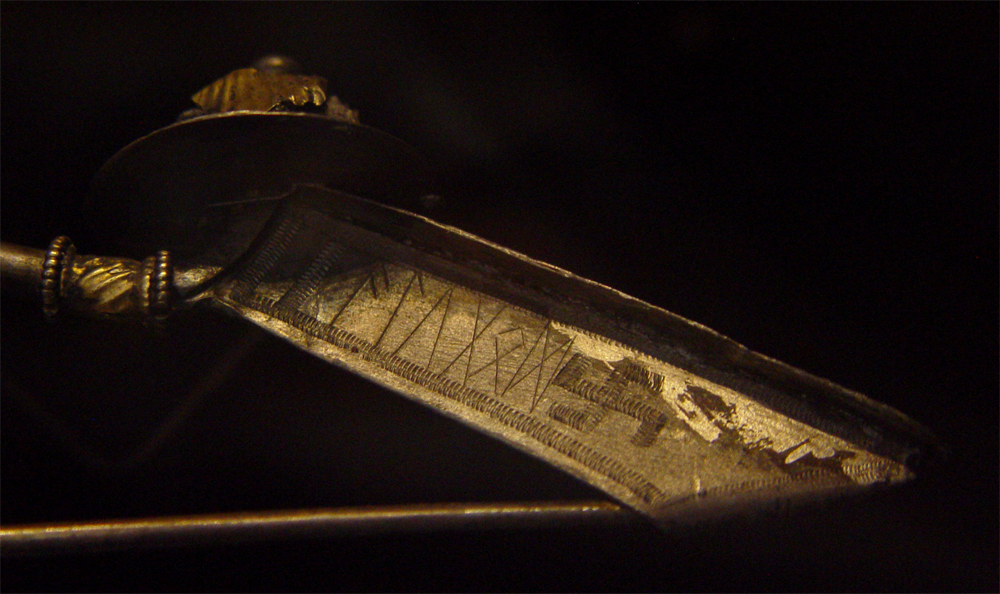
Detail of the Elder Futhark runic inscription on the pinholder of the AD 3rd-century Værløse Fibula followed by a swastika

Fibulae were composed of four components: the body, pin, spring, and hinge.

=== Body ===
The body of a fibula is known as either the bow or the plate, depending on the basic form. A bow is generally long and narrow, and often arched. A plate is flat and wide. Plates could be solid or openwork. The body was often decorated. The head is the end of the fibula with the spring or hinge. The foot is the end of the fibula where the pin closes. Depending on the type of fibula and the culture in question, the head of the fibula could be worn facing up, down or sideways.

=== Pin ===
The pin that is used to fasten the clothing is either a continuation of the fibula's body or a separate piece attached to the body. The fibula is closed by connecting the end of the pin to a catch plate, or pin rest.

=== Spring ===
The body and pin meet at either a spring or hinge. The earliest design is the spring, which provides tension to the pin. The spring could be unilateral or bilateral. A unilateral spring winds in one direction only. Unilateral springs are the earlier type, first appearing around the 14th century BC. Bilateral springs wind in one or more loops on one side of the pin and then cross over or under the bow and continue with more loops on the other side. They appeared around the 6th century BC. Bilateral springs can be very short, with only one or two revolutions per side, or up to 10 cm long. Most bilateral springs are made of one piece of metal and therefore have a spring cord, a piece of wire extending from one end of the spring to the other. The spring cord can pass in front of or behind the fibulae body. Bilateral springs wrap around a pin or axle. These are usually made of iron even if the rest of the fibula and spring is copper alloy. In the 1st century AD, some fibulae had springs concealed under a metal cover that was an extension of the fibula body. These are known as covered springs, or hidden springs.

=== Hinge ===
In the late 1st century BC or early 1st century AD, a new design appeared in some bow type fibulae. A separate pin was attached to the head-end of the bow with a small hinge. In the second half of the 1st century AD, hinges were introduced to plate type fibulae. One or two small plaques were cast on the back of the plate, and a pin was attached to them by a small hinge. Previously, plate-type fibulae had bilateral springs attached to the back. In the 3rd century AD, the hinge was placed in the centre of a long transverse bar, creating the famous crossbow fibula design. A few fibulae from a much earlier date also had hinges, although this design feature was very rare and soon died out for nearly five centuries. For example, the Asia Minor Decorated Arc Fibula (Blinkenberg Type XII Variation 16) dates to the 5th century BC.

Different types of fibula construction were used contemporaneously. Though the introduction of the hinge was later than the introduction of the spring, the spring remained in use long after the hinge was introduced. Therefore, a given fibula with a hinge is not necessarily more recent than one with a spring.

== Use ==
Fibulae were originally used to fasten clothing. They represent an improvement on the earlier straight pin which was less secure and could fall out. While the head of the earlier straight pin was often decorated, the bow or plate of the fibula provided a much increased scope for decoration. Among some cultures, different fibula designs had specific symbolic meanings. They could refer to a status or profession such as single woman, married woman, man, warrior, or chief. Some Roman-era fibulae may symbolize specific ranks or positions in the Roman legions or auxiliary. In some cultures, fibulae were worn in pairs and could be linked by a length of chain.

== Historical development ==
=== Bronze Age fibulae ===
The first fibulae design, violin bow fibulae (Drahtbügel in German), appeared in the late Bronze Age. This simple design, with a unilateral spring, looks remarkably like a modern safety pin. The violin bow fibula has a low flat arch; the body runs parallel to the pin so it resembles a violin bow. The bow could be round, square, or flat and ribbon-like in cross-section. Some had simple punched or incised decoration on the bow. Violin bow fibula, such as the Peschiera type and the Unter-Radl type, was introduced in the 14th century BC (Late Mycenean III era) by the Myceneans on the Greek Peloponnesus. The fibula soon spread to Crete, Cyprus and Mycenean trading posts in Sicily.

There were several variants of the violin bow fibula. The bow could bend, or zig-zag from side to side while still remaining flat and parallel to the pin. These variants, such as the Grunwald type and the Hanua type, were found in the 12th and 11th centuries BC. In another variant, the bow, while still flat, widened out into an oval or diamond shape (Blattbügel in German). These variants, such as the Kreuznach type and Reisen type, were found in the 12th to 10th centuries BC.

The second major design of fibulae has a high, round arch (Bogen in German) instead of the low flat arch of the violin bow fibula. At first, the bow was thin. In later variants the bow was made of thicker metal or of two pieces of thin wire twisted together. These rounded bow fibulae were first found in the 12th century BC, but lasted in use in some places for more than five centuries.

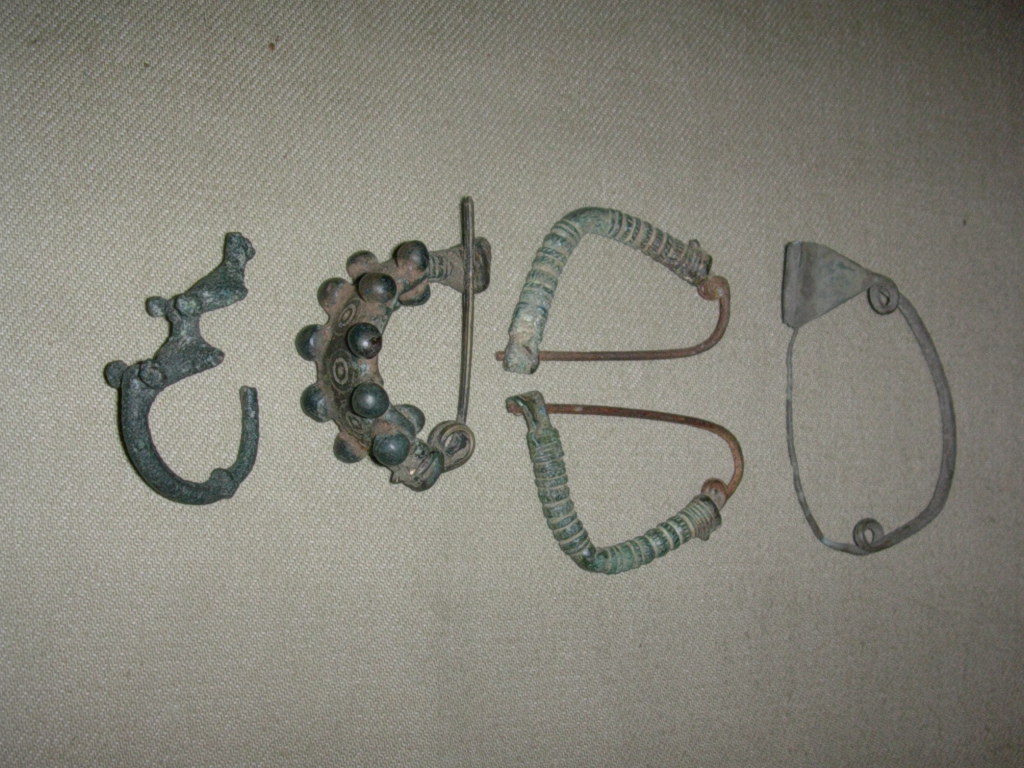
Early bow fibulae. 8th – 6th centuries BC

The third Bronze Age design of fibula consisted of horizontal wire spirals. The spectacle fibula (Brillen in German) consisted of two spirals joined. It resembles a pair of spectacles or eye glasses. These fibulae, such as the Haslau type and the St. Lucija type, were found in the 9th to 7th centuries BC. Some spectacle fibula were very large with spirals up to 10 cm across. A variant that appeared in the 6th century BC had four small spirals with a square, or squarish, cover plate on the middle, the Vierpass type.

The Villanovan culture in Italy introduced a series of variations of the bow fibula in the 8th and 7th centuries BC. In these so-called Italianate fibulae, the bow begins, at the head, with a semi-circular form, but bends at its apex to angle straight down to the foot that was often lengthened and extended. The bow was often decorated with moulded knobs or spikes. The rear half of the bow was sometimes bent into a wavy, kinked shape. The latter variants were known as serpentine fibulae.

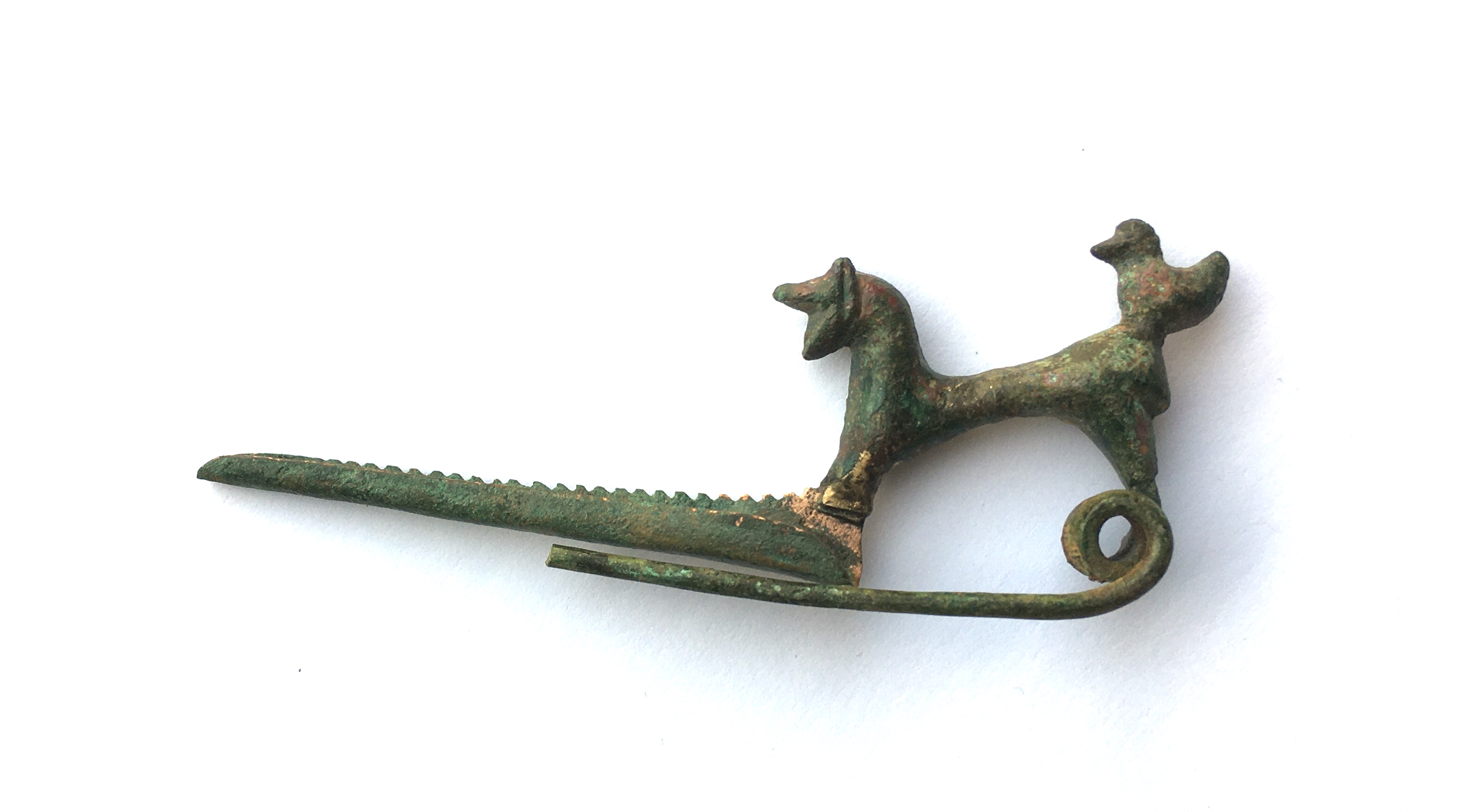
Villanovan Etruscan fibula 7th-8th BCE

Meanwhile, the 8th and 7th centuries BC saw the introduction of the so-called Phrygian bow fibulae in Asia Minor. These fibulae had a near-perfect semi-circular arch sometimes decorated with knobs or round flanges. In the same period, the Hand or Arm fibula spread from Cyprus, where it appears to have originated, to Syria, Assyria and Persia. In this design the bow was bent 90 degrees at the apex giving the fibula a triangular shape when viewed from the side. The bow was usually decorated with a series of rings and dots. The catch plate usually had the form of a hand, making the entire fibula resemble an arm.

In the 7th and 6th centuries BC, a series of variations of the bow fibula appeared in the southern Balkans, known variously as Greek, Macedonian, or Thracian bow fibulae. The high arched bow of these fibulae had large fins or knobs. The bow usually ended in a very large triangular or square catch plate. Some of the large square catch plates were decorated with complex incised geometric or figural designs. Some of the fibula had a flat back indicating that they were likely cast in simple, open moulds.

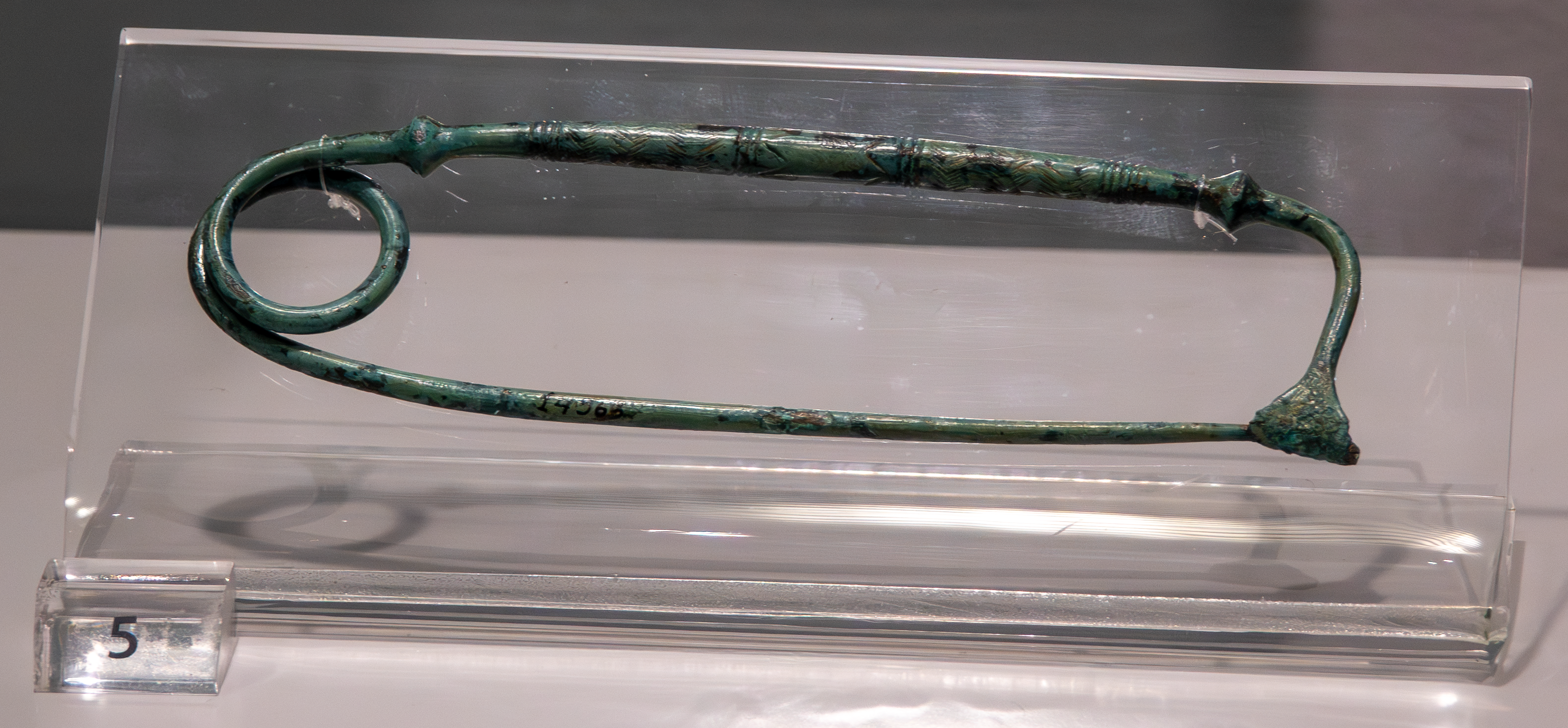
Greek bow fibula.
12th century BC

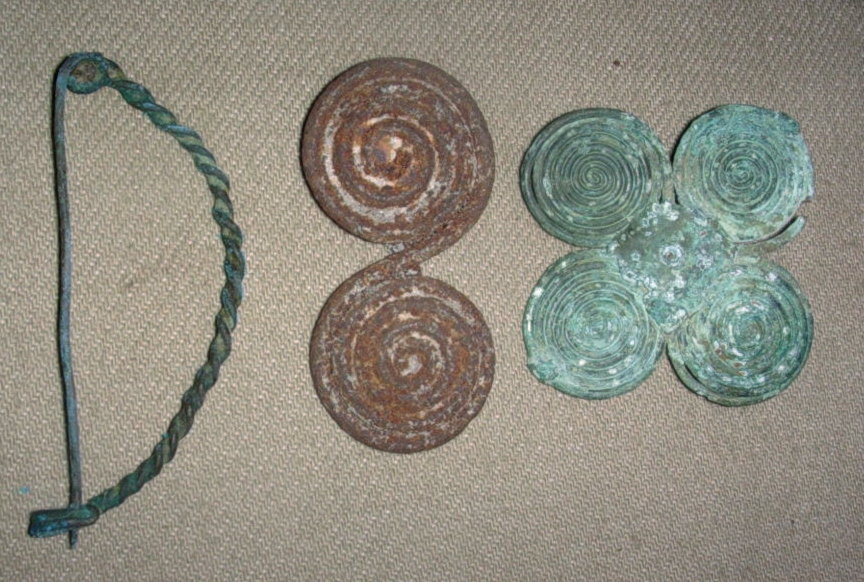
Early fibulae.
10th – 8th centuries BC

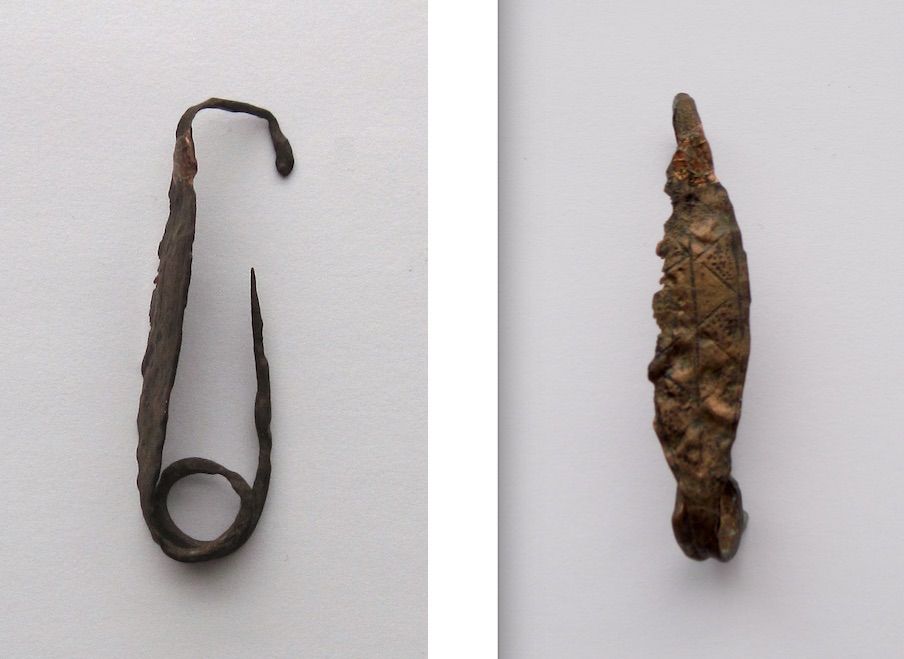
10th century BC

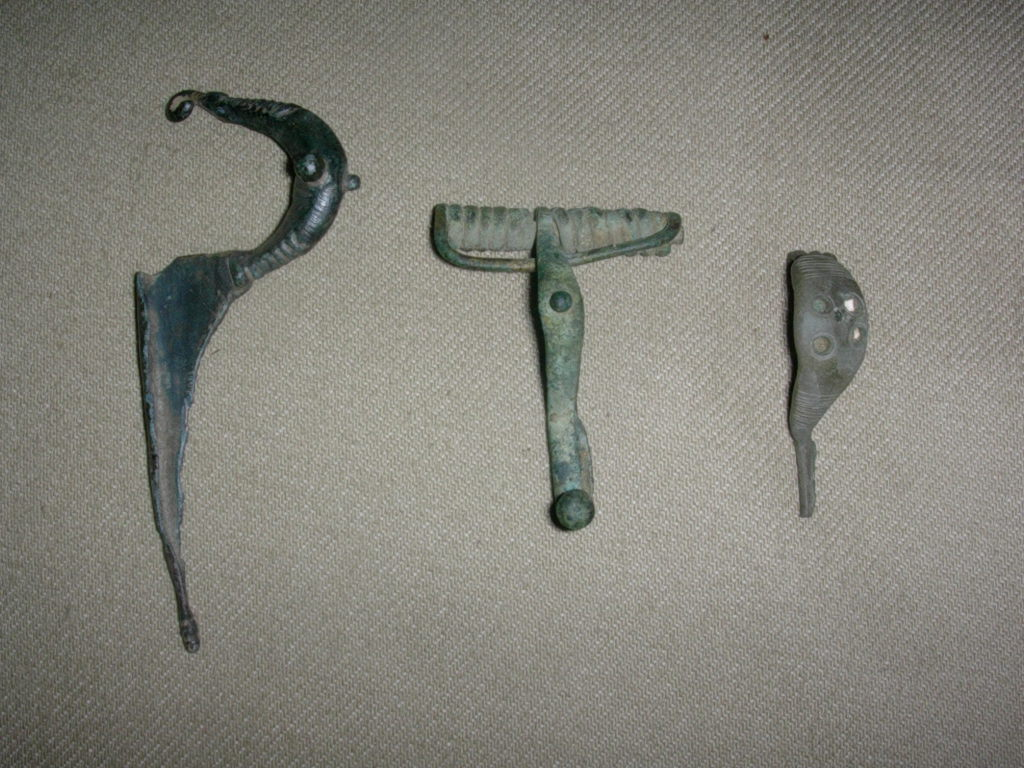
More early fibulae.
7th – 5th centuries BC

=== Iron Age fibulae ===
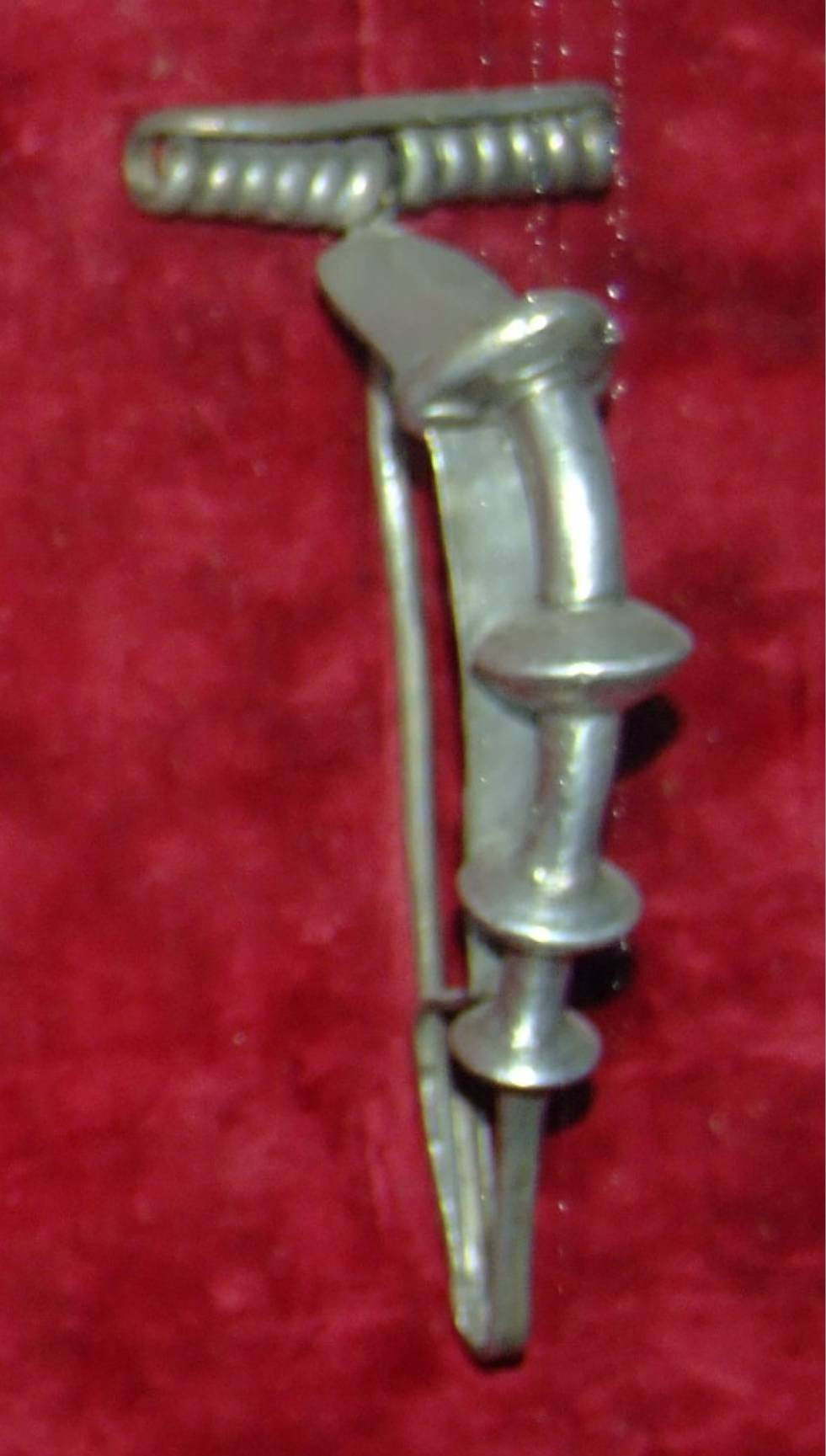
Typical silver Dacian fibulae 1st century BC (Museum of Transylvania Cluj Romania)

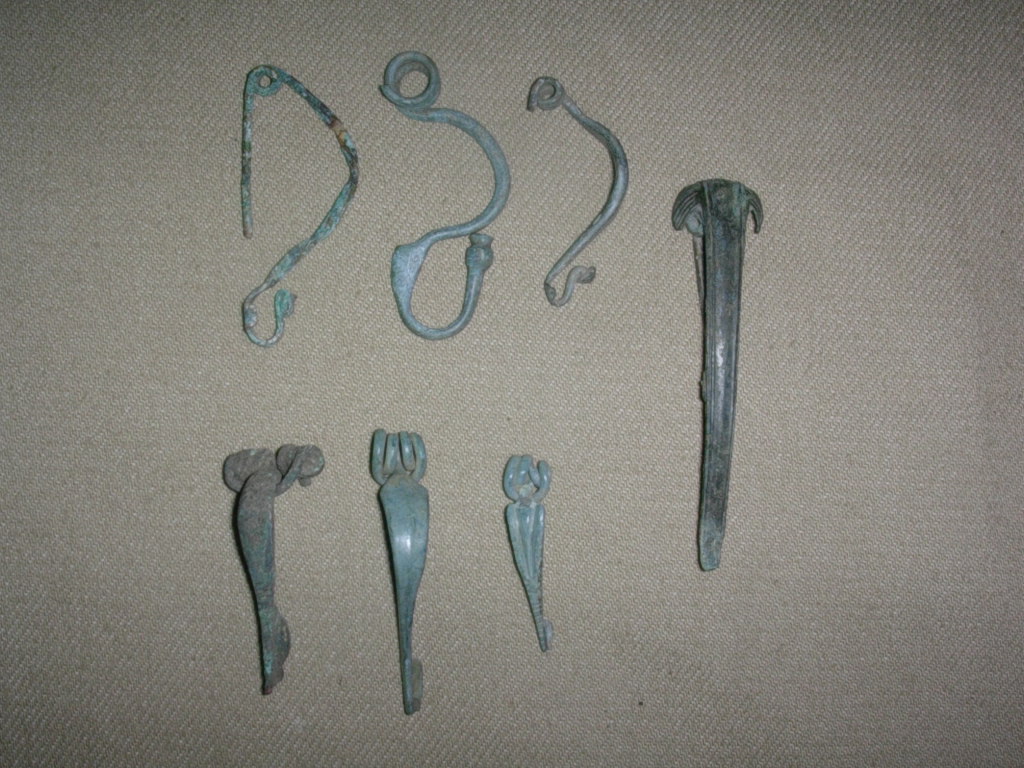
La Tène era fibulae. 4th – 1st centuries BC

The Iron Age saw an expansion in the use of fibulae. The rounded bow fibula underwent several variations and were usually highly decorated with incised or moulded geometric designs. In one variation, the foot of the fibula that had previously terminated at the end of the arch with a simple catch plate, lengthened significantly. These extended foot fibulae, such as the Kahn type and the Pauken type, were found in the 7th to 5th centuries BC. The first long, bilateral springs appeared on some of these variants in the Hallstatt D2 era (5th century BC). These fibulae, such as the Doublezier type, looked similar to the Roman-era crossbow fibulae but were not the latter's direct precursor.

In another variation of the rounded bow fibula, the bow became fat and swollen-looking. In many of these Leech Bow, or Sanguisuga, fibulae the catch plate became large and triangular. Another variant, the Certosa type, had a small square or ribbon cross-section bow and a short bilateral spring (possibly the first use of a bilateral spring). Certosa fibulae are often very small, but can reach lengths of over 10–15 cm.

In the La Tène I, or La Tène A to B2, era (4th to 3rd centuries BC), fibula design became relatively standardised over a large geographic area, although minor stylistic variations and differences in decoration remained. The La Tène I fibula usually had a narrow bow. The spring that could be either unilateral or bilateral, was wound in a fairly large diameter circle. The foot was turned up and usually ended in a decorated knob or with an applied bead or stone. In some cases the raised foot was bent back towards the bow, although it did not touch the bow. The Thraco-Getic fibula is a variant found in the eastern Balkans and used by the Getae. The fibula's foot is vertical and ends in a small knob, though later models had a sinuous, s-shaped profile.

The La Tène I era also saw the introduction of the first animal, or zoomorphic, designs. These included birds and horses and could either be flat, with a short bilateral spring on the back, or three-dimensional ("in the round") with a long bilateral spring at the head.

In the La Tène II, or La Tène C era (2nd century BC), the foot of the fibula actually bent back to touch the bow and was wrapped around it. Many La Tène II fibulae had long bilateral springs. It is important to be aware that this type of construction was in use several centuries later in the tied-foot and returned-foot types of fibulae. These latter types are sometimes known as pseudo-La Tène fibulae.

In the La Tène III, or La Tène D era (1st century BC), the raised foot was no longer wrapped around the bow but was attached directly to it by casting or welding creating a loop above the foot. In one variant, the Nauheim type, the bow widened into a flat triangle or diamond. In another variant, the Schussel type, the ribbon-like bow widened at the head into a rounded arrowhead shape that covered the spring.

=== Roman-era fibulae ===
==== The 1st century AD ====
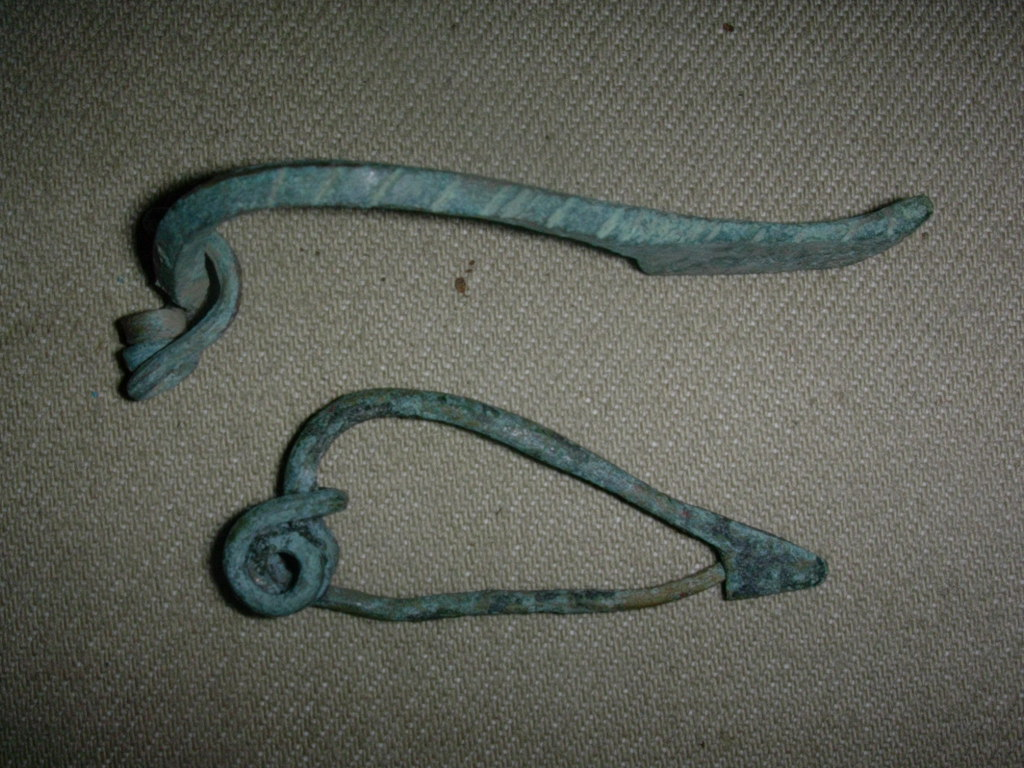
Legionnaire's fibulae. 1st – 2nd centuries AD

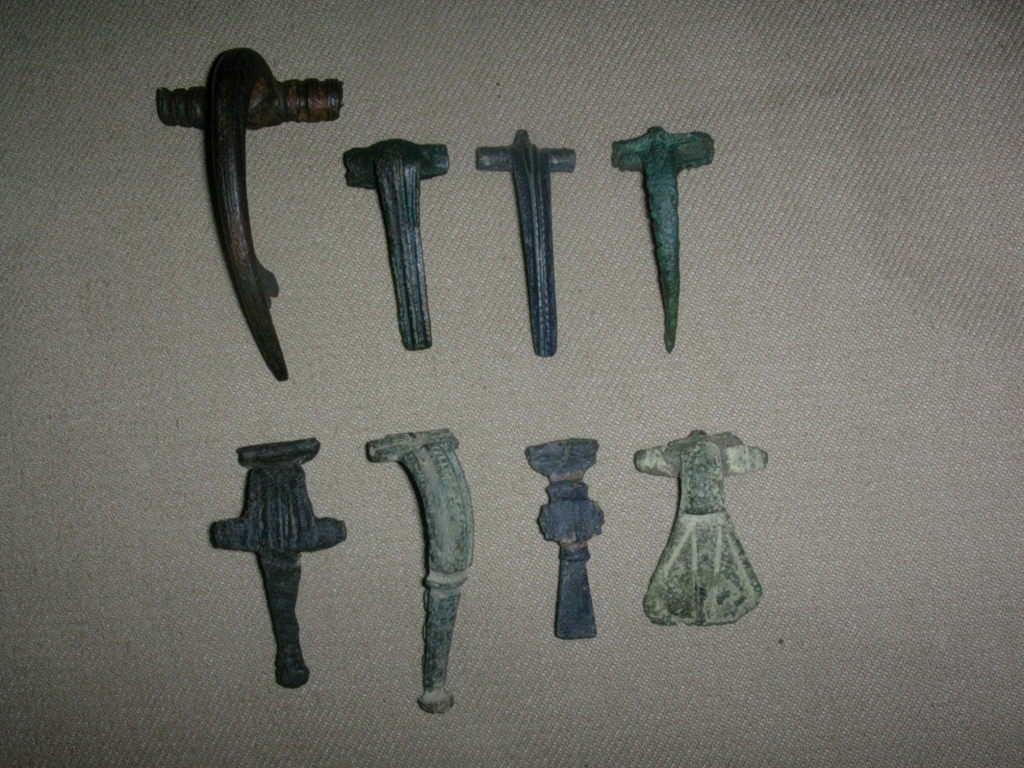
Romano-Britannic fibulae.
1st century AD

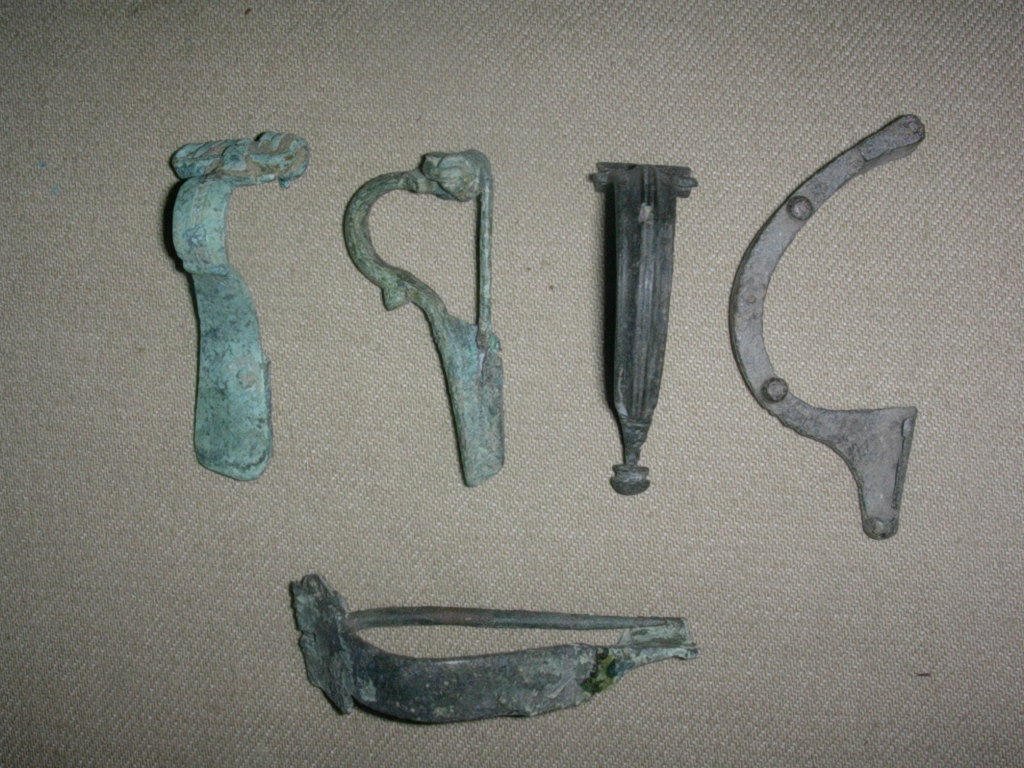
Early Roman era bow fibulae.
1st century AD

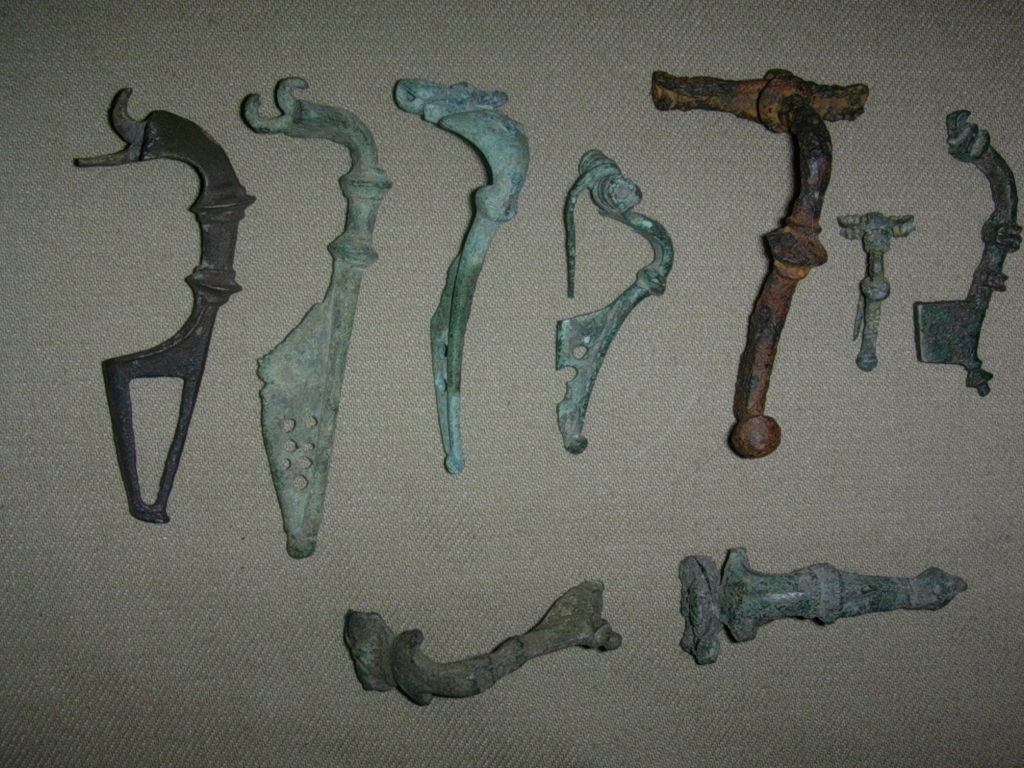
Kräftig Profilierte fibulae.
1st – 2nd centuries AD

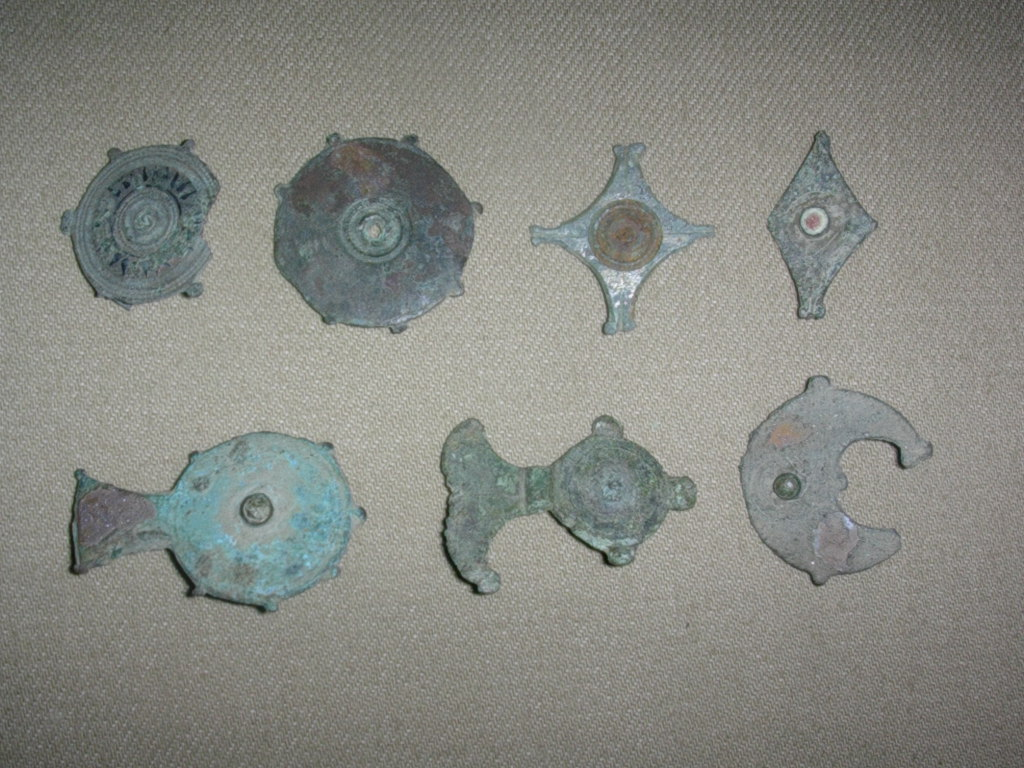
Roman era plate fibulae. 1st century AD

The rapid spread of the Roman Empire by the 1st century AD resulted in a tremendous growth in the number and design of fibulae throughout Europe and the Near East. The spread of technologically advanced workshops in the Roman Empire led to more complex fibula designs. Bows were cast in more complex forms, hinges appeared alongside bilateral springs and a wide variety of plate designs were introduced.

One of the first fibula designs of the Roman-era began in the La Tène III era, in the late 1st century BC. The Straight Wire fibula, also known as the Soldier's type or Legionnaire's type, is a very plain design. It resembles the violin bow fibula of over one thousand years earlier except that the bow has slightly more of an arch and the spring in (short) bilateral not unilateral. The Straight Wire fibula is found through the 1st century AD.

In the 1st century AD, for the first time, several fibula designs originated in Roman Britain. Perhaps the most distinctive British fibula design was the Dolphin. This was actually a series of designs including the Polden Hill type, the Langton Down type, the Colchester type and the T-Shaped type. Dolphin fibulae have a smooth arched bow that tapers from the head to end in a long point. The long bilateral spring is covered. From the top the Dolphin fibula looks like a T or the late-Roman crossbow fibula. From the side it resembles a leaping dolphin.

Another British design was the Hod Hill type. Usually quite small, Hod Hill fibulae have a shallow arched bow that appears to be made up of lumpy segments. Many Hod Hill fibulae have a pair of small side lugs.

The Fantail fibula, which have a short bow that flares into a flat, wide fan-shaped foot, were common in Britain and on the European continent. The Fantail design lasted into the 2nd century AD. A common and widespread design was the Augen (or Eye) fibula, which has a longer bow and a long, flat, wide foot. It has a short bilateral spring. Many Augen fibulae are decorated with a pair of ringed dots, or eyes, on the flat foot. Augen fibulae appear to have been introduced to the Roman Empire by Germanic peoples, notably Marcomanni, serving as Roman auxiliaries.

The Aucissa fibula was another widespread design. It has a high semi-circular arched bow that extended into a short foot. The bow is flat and wide and has a rounded central ridge. The bow ends, at the head, in a hinge. The Aucissa was one of the first fibulae to use a hinge instead of a spring. The foot ends in a rounded knob. Many Aucissa fibulae have the word "AVCISSA" moulded above the hinge. This is thought to be the name of a workshop.

The 1st century AD saw several other bow variations. The Wolf or Wolf's Head fibula has a flat, ribbon-like bow that widens into a square section at the head. The common design of two circles and a chevron near the rear of the bow is often interpreted as a wolf's head. The Thracian Anchor type has a wide crescent at the head giving the fibula an anchor shape. The Thracian Anchor type is also called the Illyrian and is found in Pannonia (Hungary), Dacia (Romania) and Serbia.

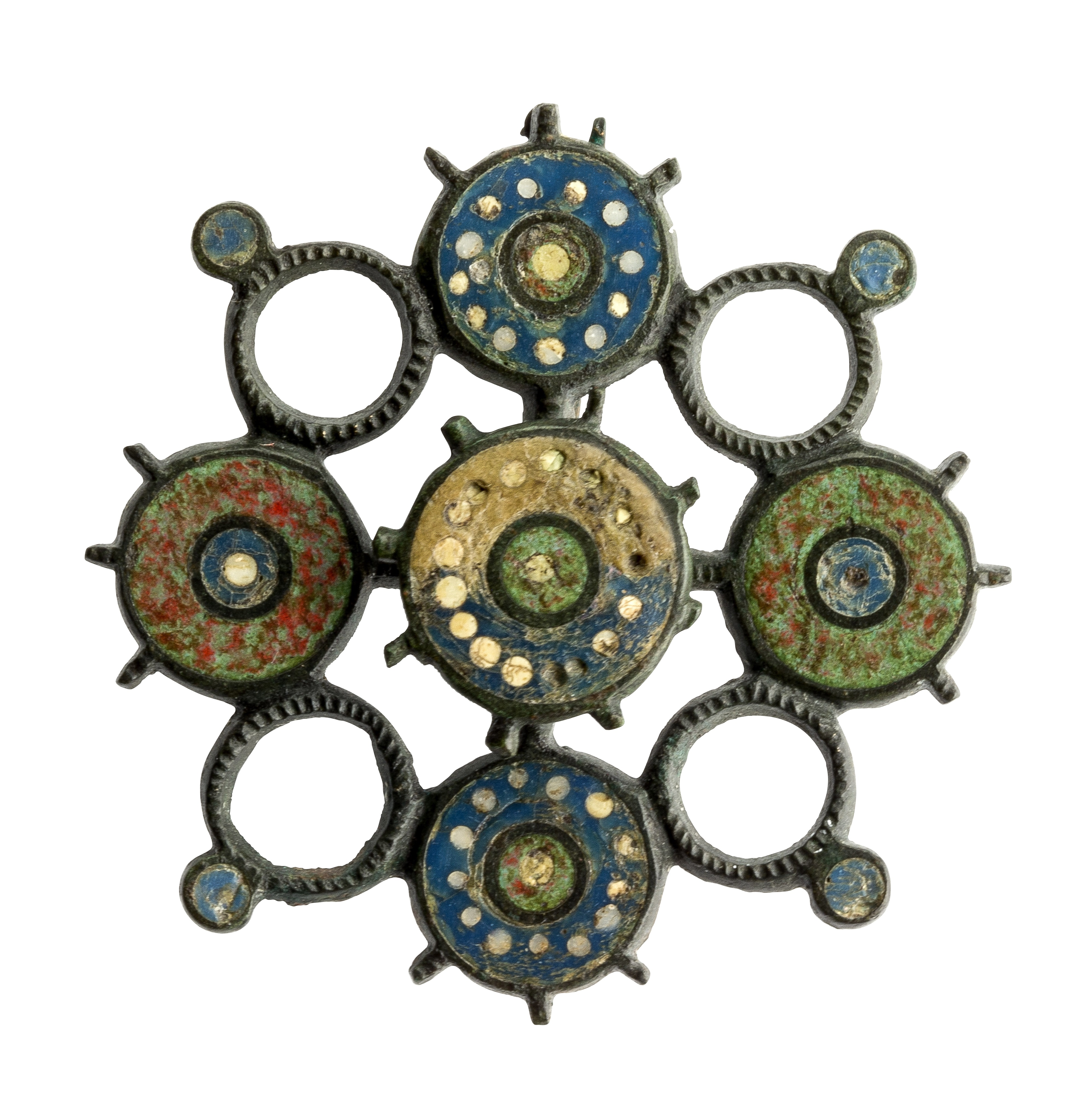
Disc fibula, enamelled bronze, 180–220 A.D., found in Tongres Gallo-Roman museum, Tongres

The late 1st century AD saw the introduction of the Kräftig Profilierte group of fibula designs. Kräftig Profilierte fibulae have a wide fan-, or bell-shaped head and a long thin pointy foot. They have long bilateral hinges. There are three main variations of the Kräftig Profilierte fibula. The North Pannonian Double Knot type, found in Pannonia has two knobs, or knots, on the bow. The Single Knot type, found in the central Balkans, has a single knob. The Black Sea type, found in the steppes north of the Black Sea, has a thin body, with no flaring near the head, and two knots. Kräftig Profilierte fibulae were found in the late 1st to late 2nd centuries AD and are mostly associated with the Przeworsk proto-Gothic culture.

The 1st century AD saw the widespread use of plate fibulae. Plate fibulae consist of a flat plate. Since there is little space between the fibula body and the pin (there is no arch to the body), plate fibulae could not be used to fasten much material and were therefore mainly decorative. Most plate fibulae have a hinge assembly on the back. Plate fibulae are generally associated with women's graves. The most common forms of plate fibula in the 1st century AD were round (disc), diamond, oval and lunula (crescent- or moon-shaped).

==== The 2nd century AD ====
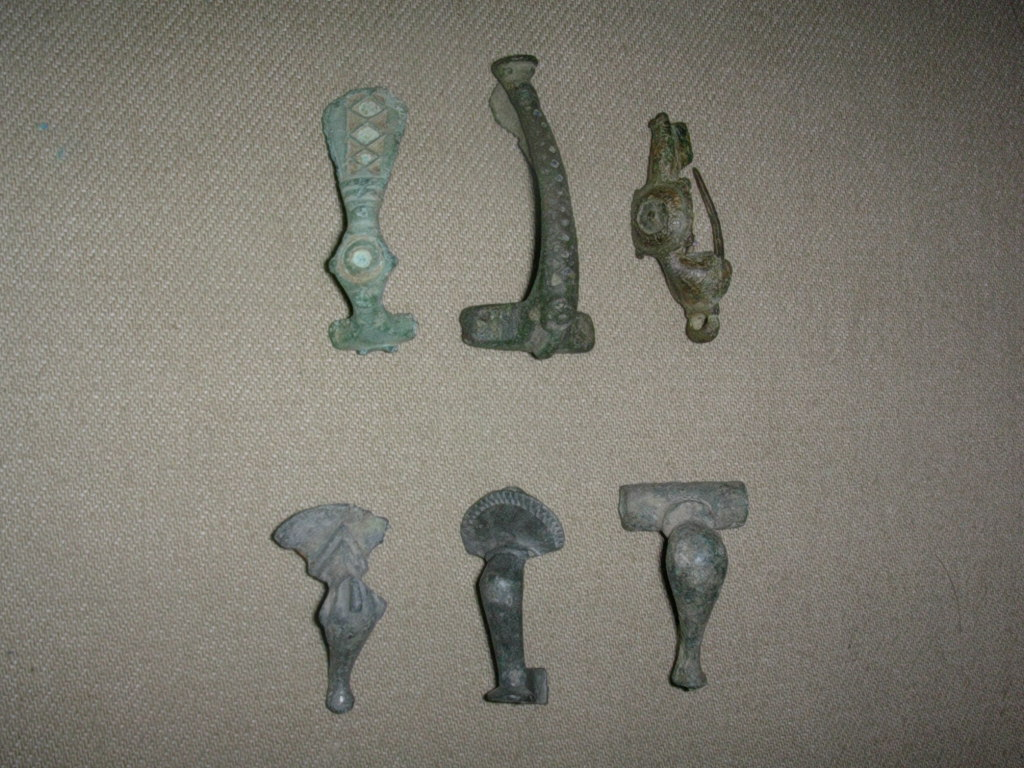
Roman era fibulae.
2nd century AD

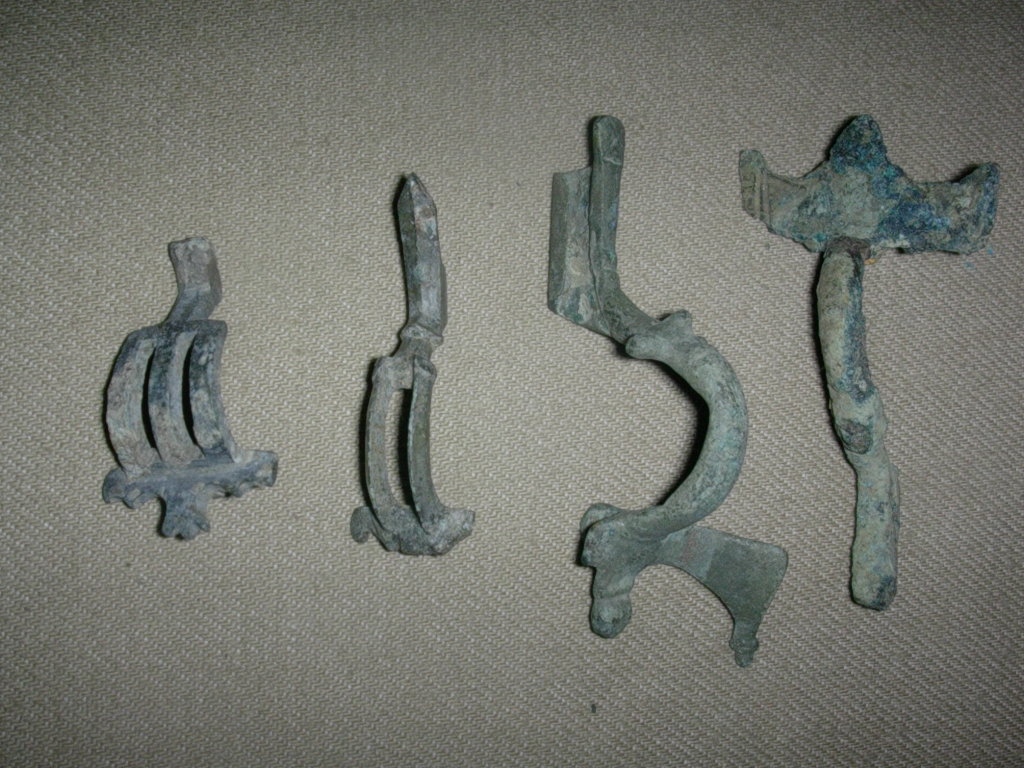
Late Roman bow fibulae.
2nd – 3rd centuries AD

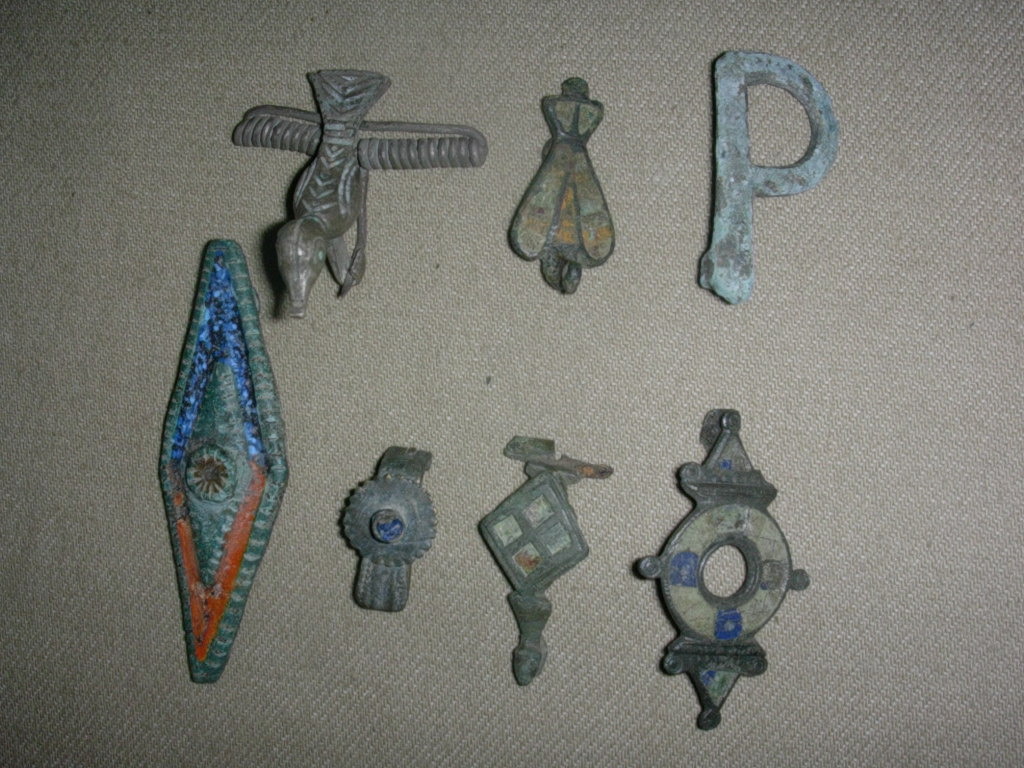
Diverse fibulae.
4th century BC – 3rd century AD

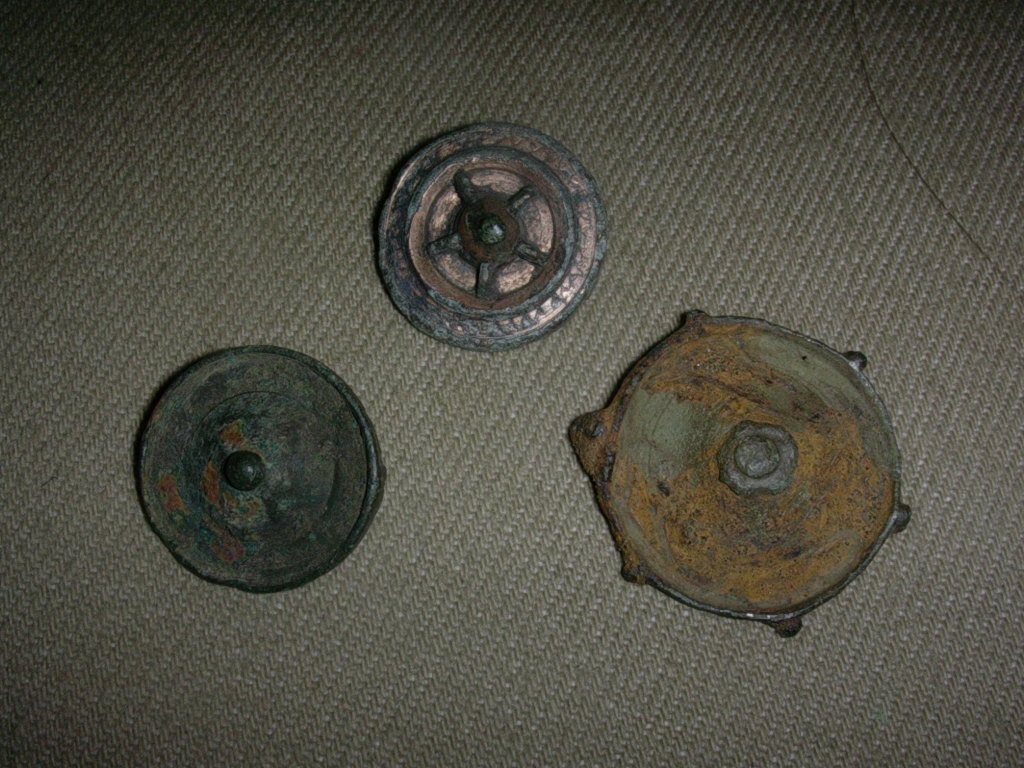
Tutulus plate fibulae.
2nd – 3rd centuries AD

In Roman Britain the fibula designs common in the 1st century AD continued to some extent into the second, although usually in more complex variations. A new design, the Head Stud type, has a long bow with a stud, or occasionally a ring, at the head.

The Knee fibula, a common design in the 2nd century AD, originated in Roman Pannonia (modern Hungary). With its short, fat bow that incorporates a 90 degree bend, archeologists thought it resembled a knee and leg. Many Knee fibulae have small rectangular, or larger semi-circular head plates. Knee fibulae appear, like the Augen type, to have been introduced into the Roman Empire by Germanic allies. Despite their small size, their appearance in Roman military graves implies that the Knee fibula was the most popular fibula among Roman soldiers in the 2nd century AD. They are rarely found outside military sites or contexts.

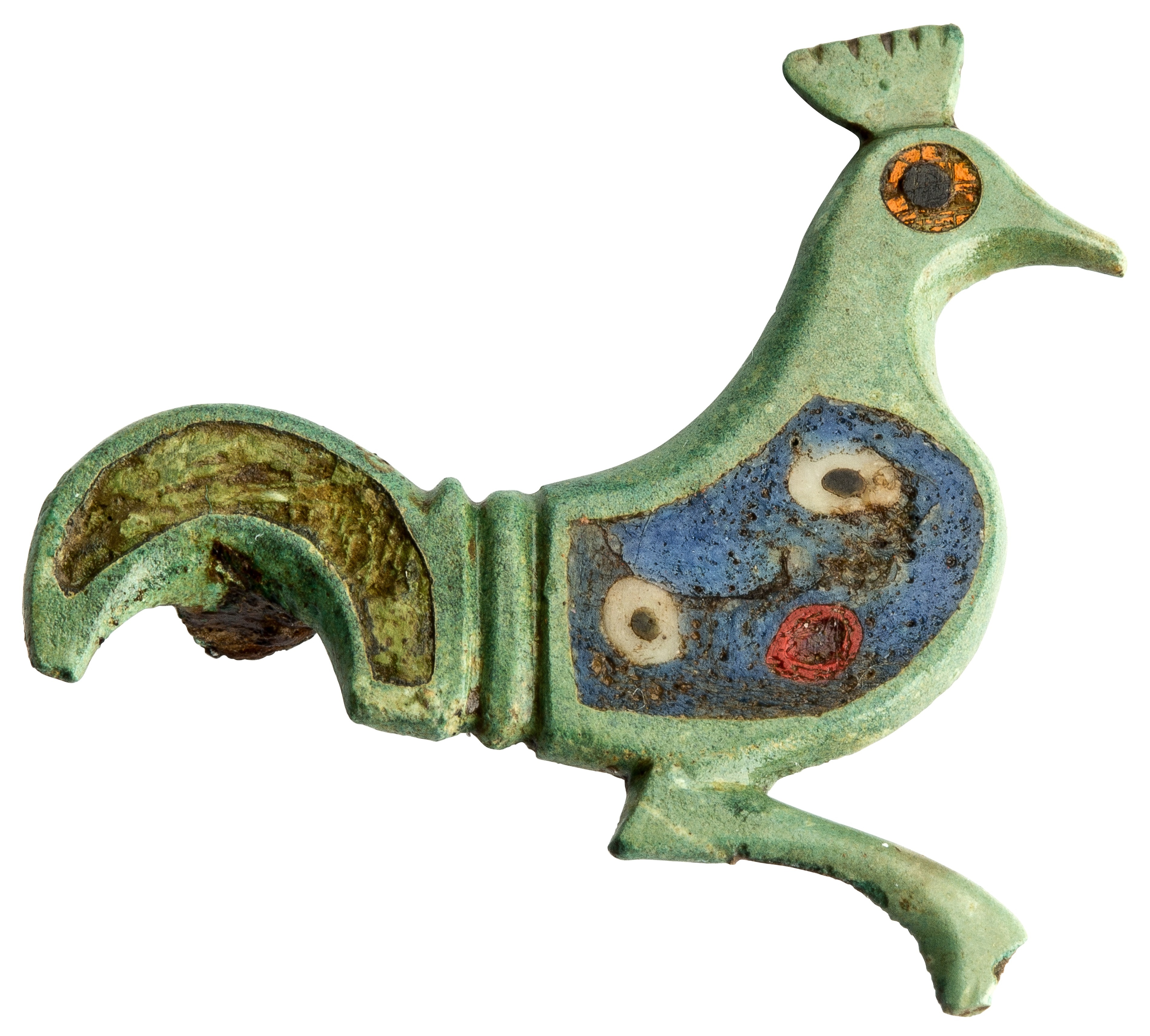
Roman zoomorphic fibula, enamelled bronze, 100–200 A.D., ca. 3,3 cm Gallo-Roman museum, Tongres

The Pannonian Trumpet fibula has a wide flaring head like the bell of a trumpet. However, unlike a straight trumpet, the Pannonian Trumpet fibula is sharply bent near the head. This Germanic design was found in and around Pannonia but was exported as widely as Britain.

The P-Shaped type is another common 2nd-century AD fibula design that originated among the Germanic peoples. The P-Shaped fibula, or Almgren Type 162, has a semi-circular arch and a long foot that curves back under itself to return to the base of the arch. They have bilateral springs. The bows of P-Shaped fibulae are usually semi-circular in cross-section and are decorated with ribs. P-Shaped fibulae were found from the 2nd to the early 4th centuries.

There were other bow fibula variations of the 2nd and 3rd centuries AD. The Divided Bow type has an arched bow and a long foot. The arch was made up of two, or even three, separate, but parallel, arches. These arches are either wide and flat or narrow and tall. The Trident fibula has a rounded arch and long foot and a wide, flat head plate with three points. The entire fibula looks like a trident. Claims that this was the standard fibula of the Roman navy are unfounded.

The use of plate fibulae continued in the 2nd century CE. Simple flat shapes were replaced with enamelled versions or more complex shapes. These included animal (zoomorphic) shapes (birds, horses, rabbits, flies, etc.), letters or words, abstract symmetrical or asymmetrical designs (including the so-called Celtic Trumpet designs), and skeuomorphic designs (symbolic designs). Most designs continued in use throughout the 2nd and 3rd centuries. In one later variation during this time, the Tutulus type, the circular disc plate was extended upwards to form a cone.

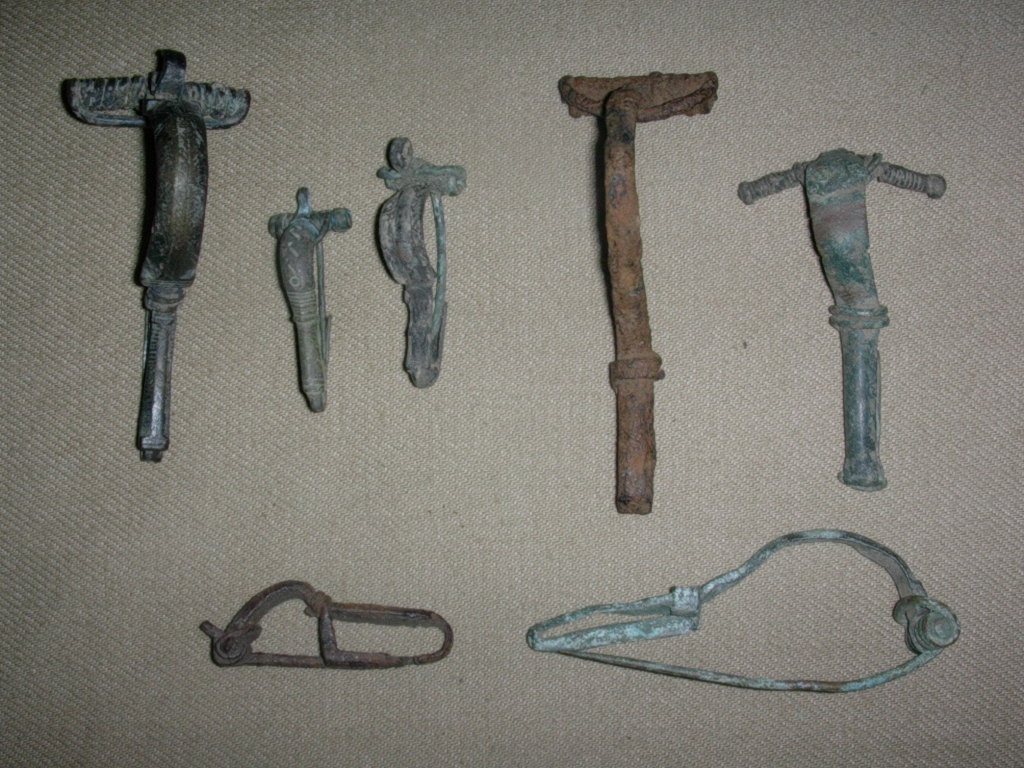
P-shaped fibulae. 3rd – 5th centuries AD

==== The 3rd to 4th centuries AD ====
The use of enamelled inlay continued until the end of the 3rd century AD.

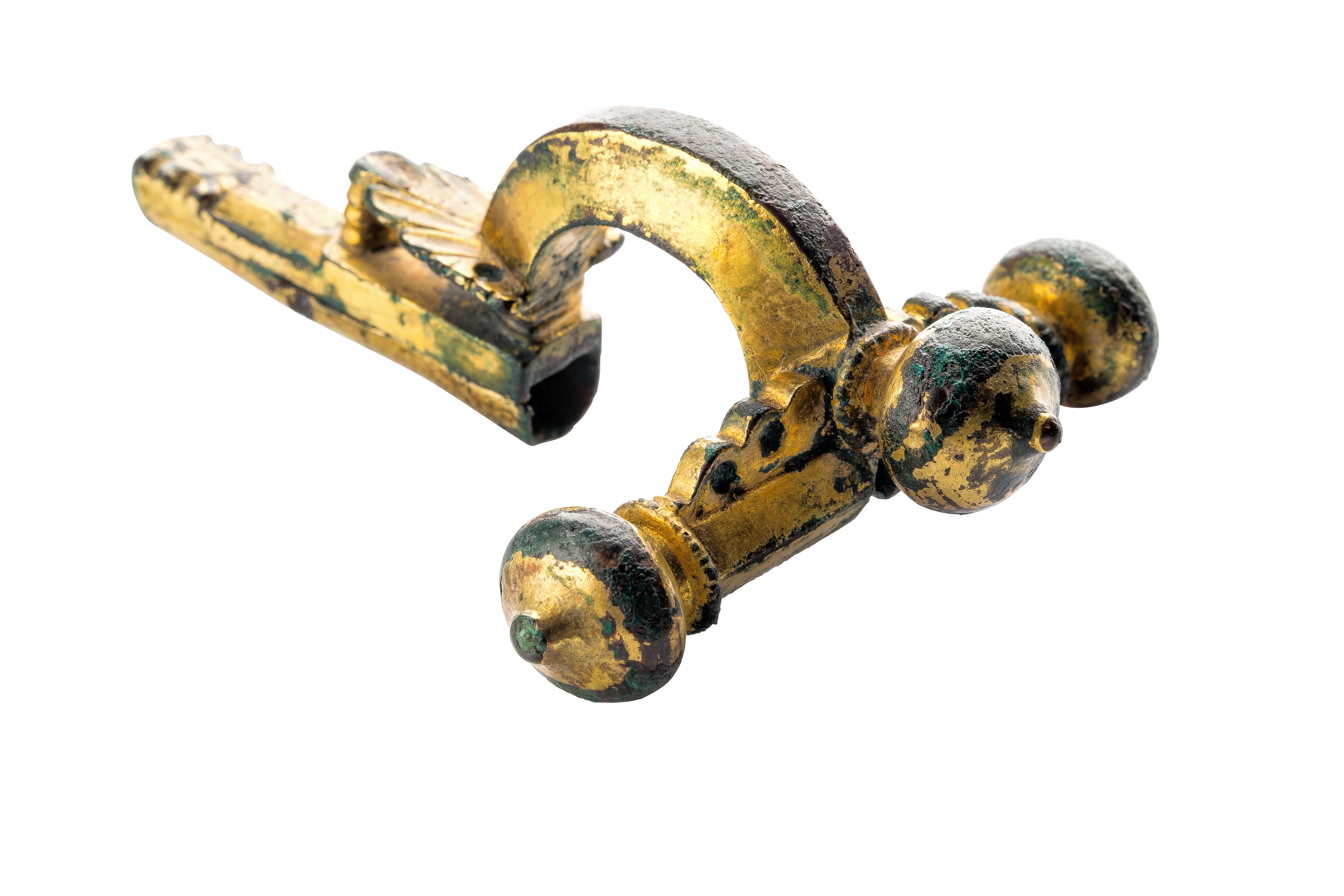
Crossbow fibula in goldplated bronze, 4th century A.D., 8,3 cm long, found in Tongeren Gallo-Roman museum, Tongres

A variation of the P-shaped fibula, the tied foot fibula has a foot that returns to the bow but then wraps, or ties, around the bow. Many Tied Foot fibulae have long bilateral springs. The tied foot fibula was found in the 3rd and 4th centuries AD and is associated with the Wielbark Gothic culture.

The classic fibula of the late-Roman era, and in fact the best known of all fibula types, is the crossbow type. The crossbow fibula consists of a highly arched semi-circular bow, usually of squarish cross-section, and a long flat foot. The fibula has a wide transverse bar (or arms) at the head containing the pin-hinge. Crossbow fibulae usually have three round or onion-shaped knobs: one at the head and one at each end of the transverse bar.

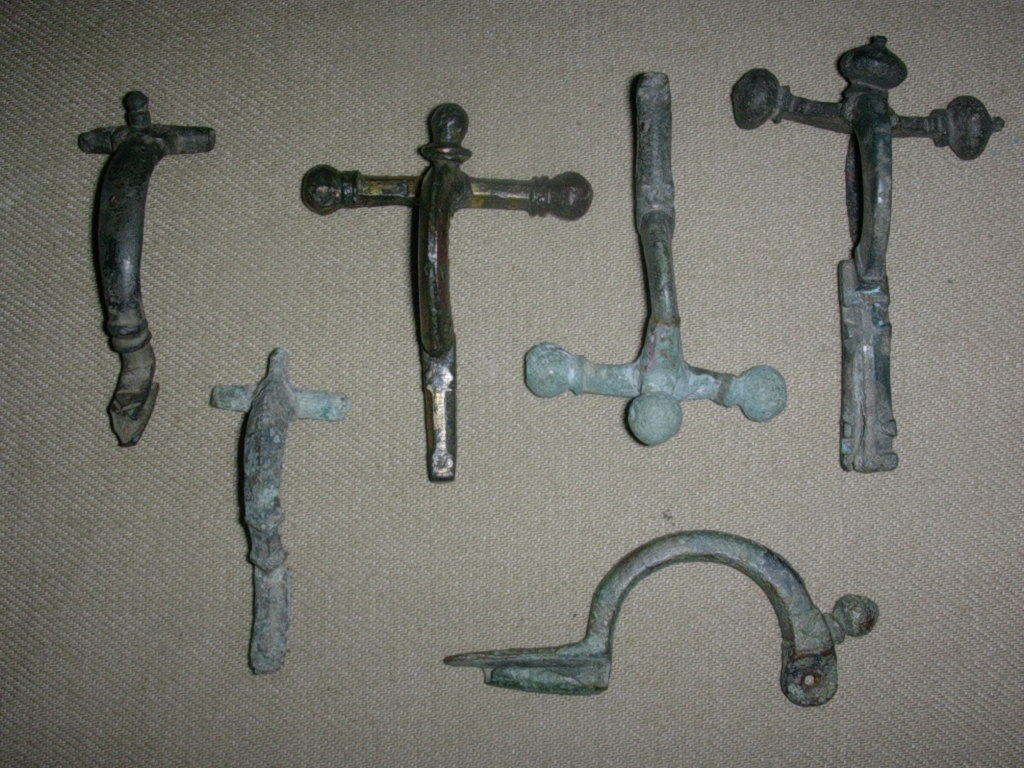
Crossbow fibulae. 3rd – 5th centuries AD

The first crossbow fibulae, from the early 3rd century AD, has short, thin arms, no knobs, a long bow and a short foot. The later crossbow fibulae have been divided into groups by several archeologists including Keller, Prottel and Soupault. Type I, dating to the 3rd and 4th centuries, has small, simple knobs and a foot that is shorter than the bow. Type II, dating to the 4th century, has larger knobs and a foot that is approximately the same length as the bow. Type III, also dating to the 4th century, has a foot that is longer than the bow. There are several variants of the Type III based on the decoration of the foot: dotted circles, chevrons, or curlicues. Another variant, dating to the 4th and 5th centuries, the Bugelkopf type, has no transverse bar, or arms at all but retains the round knob at the head.

=== Post-Roman fibulae ===
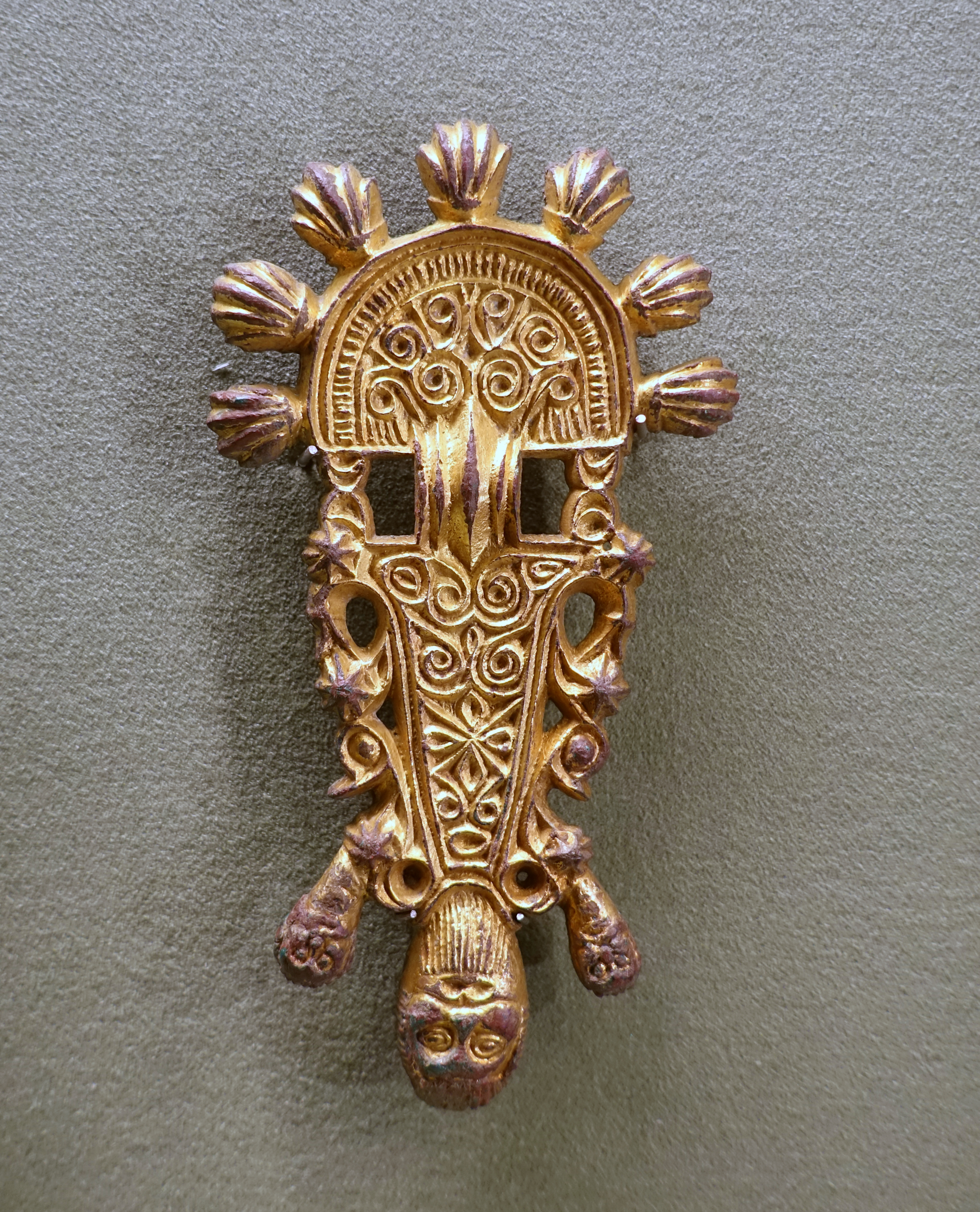
Slavic fibula brooch made of copper, c. 600–650 AD

There are numerous types of post-Roman fibulae. The so-called Gothic group of bow fibulae have a round or triangular flat head plate, often with 3, 5 or 7 knobs, a small arched bow and a long flat diamond shaped foot.

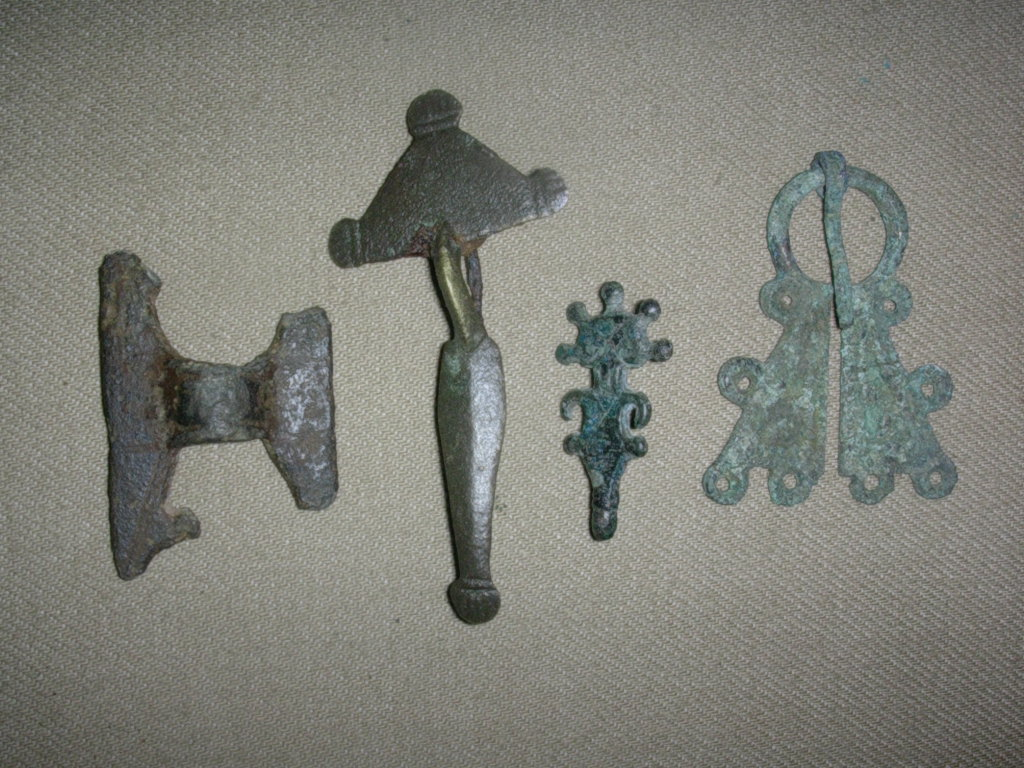
Post-Roman fibulae. 5th – 10th centuries AD

They were widely used by the Germanic Visigoths, Ostrogoths, Gepids and the non-Germanic Slavs and Avars, and are found over a wide part of southern and western Europe in the 5th and 6th centuries AD. Some historians have debated whether some of these Gothic fibulae could also be attributed to the Vandals. There are also a wide variety of Anglo-Saxon fibulae from the 5th to 7th century such as the equal-arm type and the small-long type. Most Viking fibulae are variations on the ring or annular design (see below).

=== Ring fibulae and penannular brooches ===
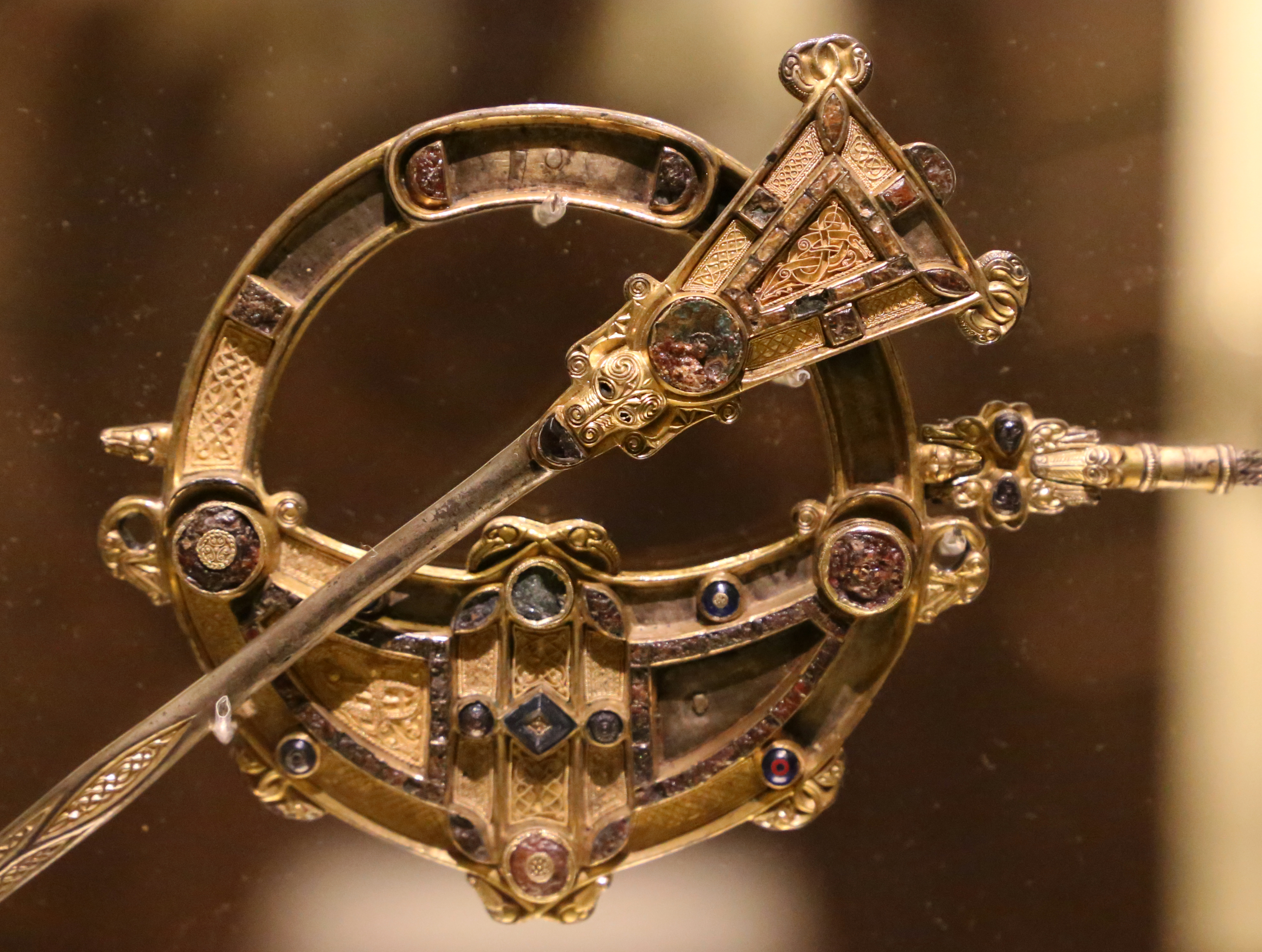
The early 8th century Tara Brooch, the most ornate of the Irish brooches, also decorated on the back.

The ring, or annular, fibula or brooch is extremely hard to date as the design for utilitarian pieces was almost unchanged from the 2nd to the 14th centuries AD. If there is decoration, this is likely to indicate whether a given ring fibula is Roman-era fibula or a medieval brooch.

The penannular brooch, with an incomplete ring and two terminals, originally a common utilitarian clothes fastening, normally of base metal, in Iron Age and Roman Britain developed in the post-Roman period into highly elaborate and decorative marks of status in Ireland and Scotland, made in precious metals and often decorated with gems, and worn by men and women, as well as the clergy as part of their vestments when conducting services. The finest period is from the 8th and 9th centuries, before the Vikings disrupted the societies. Ornate Irish examples in the period are usually "pseudo-penannular"; in fact closed rings, but imitating the penannular form. Examples like the Tara Brooch are among the most spectacular pieces of jewellery of the early medieval period. When the Vikings began to raid and settle the British Isles, they took to wearing these brooches, but now in plain silver. The thistle and bossed types were the most popular styles, both developing out of earlier Celtic styles. The post-Roman types are not called "fibulae" in English, though they are in other languages.

=== Medieval brooches ===
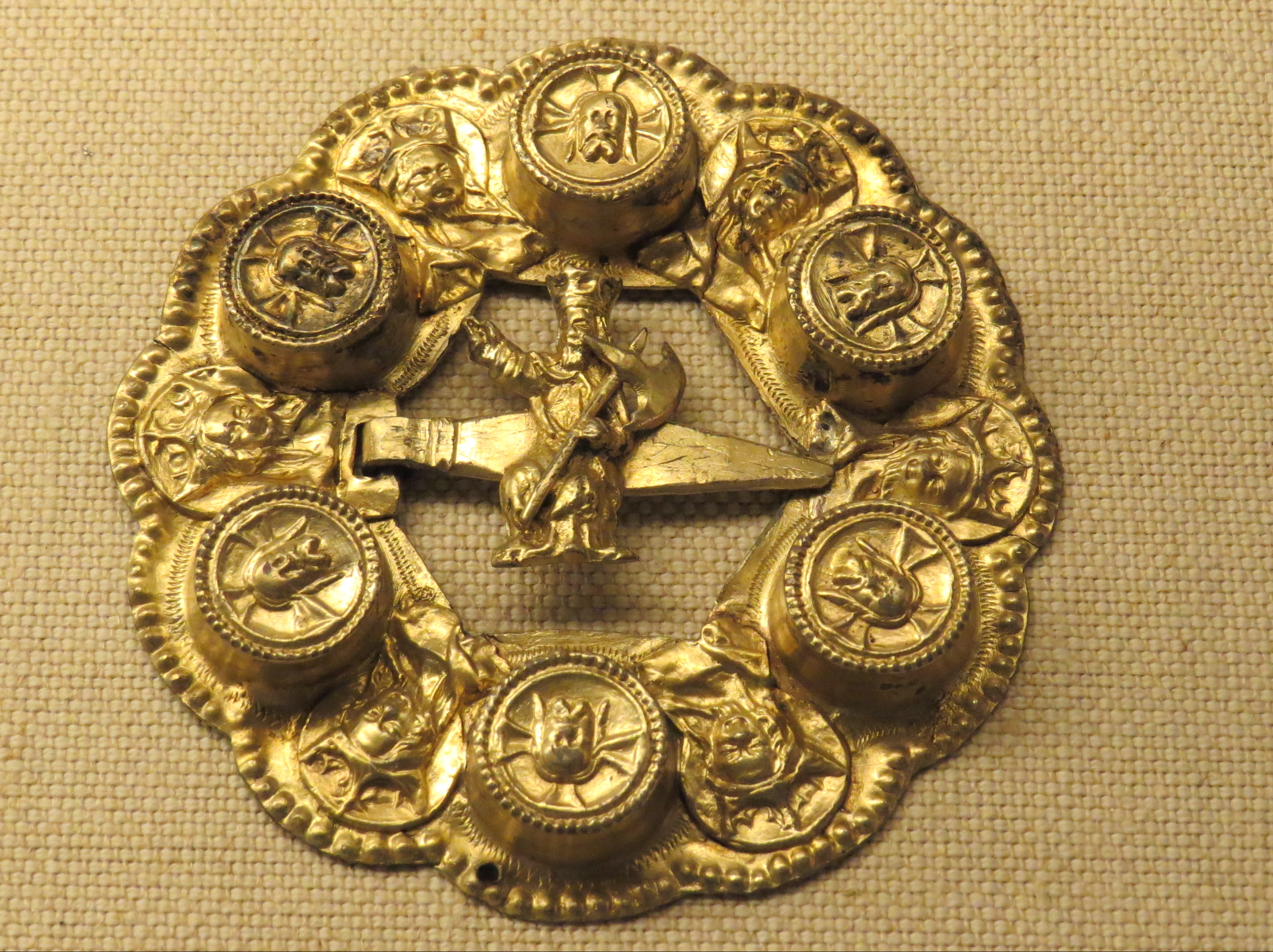
Brooch of gilded silver featuring Saint Olav in the center with an ax in his left hand, National Museum of Denmark, Copenhagen

There is a huge variety of medieval brooch types (the term fibula is rarely used for medieval items). The two most common are ring brooches, including square and lobed or flower designs as well as round ones, and flat plate brooches, or badges, in the form of people or animals, with specialized types such as pilgrim badges or livery badges, which were often produced in large quantities in cheap metals such as lead, but also in very expensive forms such as the Dunstable Swan Jewel. However these are mostly purely decorative, or worn to denote something about the wearer, and were probably not much used for fastening.

== See also ==
- Clothing in ancient Greece
- Hook-and-eye closure

== Sources ==
- Yarwood, Doreen (1986). The Encyclopedia of World Costume. Bonanza Books. ISBN 0-517-61943-1
- Muscarella, Oscar W.. "Ancient Safety Pins." Expedition Magazine 6, no. 2 January, 1964
