= Gallo-Roman Museum, Tongeren =

Archaeology museum in Belgium

Gallo-Roman Museum
- Gallo-Romeins Museum
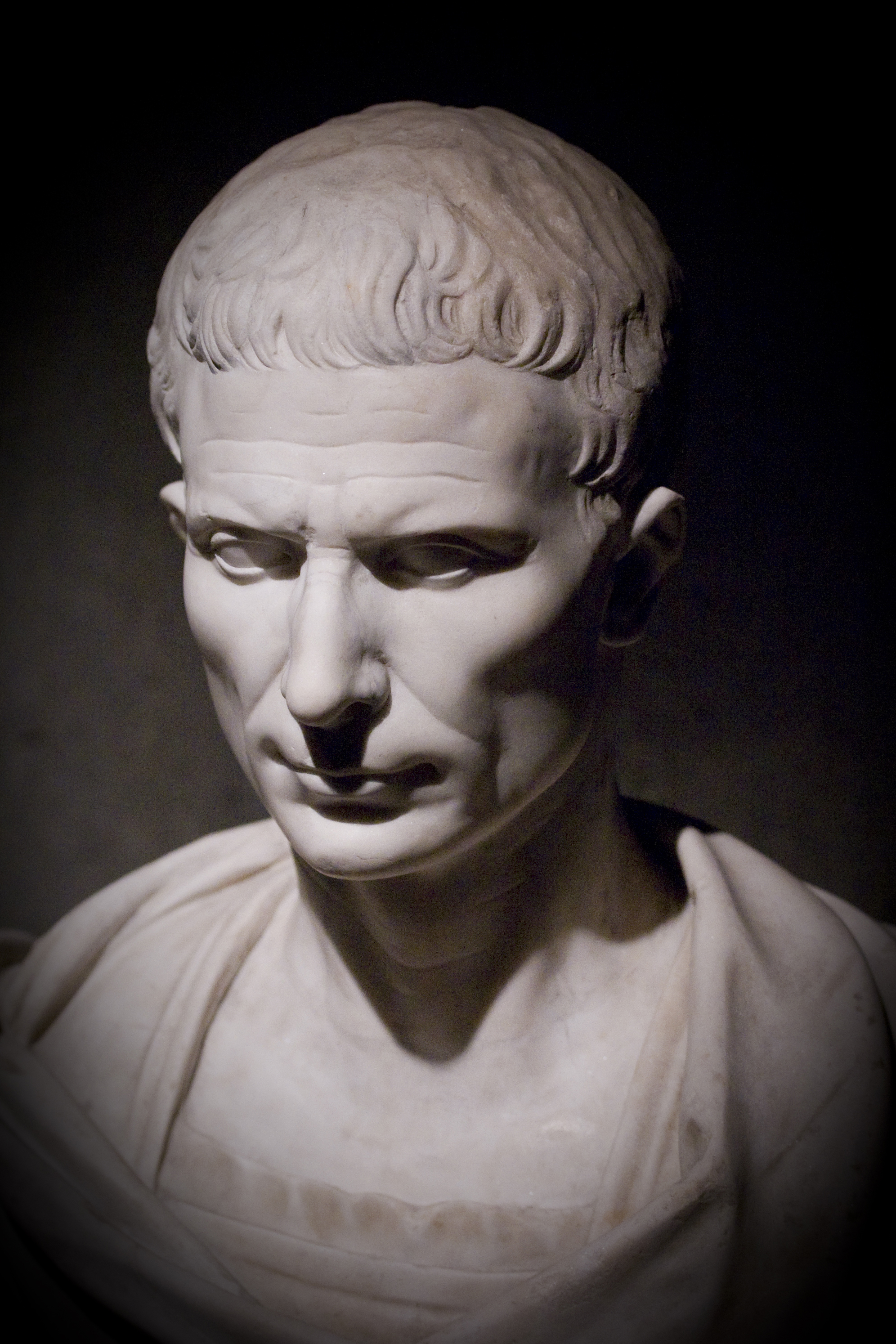
- 1st century BC marble bust of Julius Caesar on display at the museum
- Established: 1954
- Location: Kielenstraat 16, Tongeren, Belgium
- Coordinates: 50°46′53″N 5°27′58″E
- Type: Archaeology museum
- Website: galloromeinsmuseum.be

The Gallo-Roman Museum (Dutch: Gallo-Romeins Museum, French: Musée Gallo-romain, German: Gallo-Römisches Museum) is an archeological museum in Tongeren. It is dedicated to the prehistorical times and Roman age of the region in South East Flanders. The museum was established in 1954 and received its modern building in 1994. In 2011, it was awarded as the European Museum of the Year.

== History ==
In the 19th century the Royal History and Antiquarian Society of Tongeren had amassed a collection of archaeological discoveries from the area. Some of this collection was then displayed in the city from 1854. In 1937 the Provincial Museum opened in Hasselt where the most important pieces of the Tongeren collection were exhibited. In 1954 the Provincial Gallo-Roman Museum was opened in Tongeren.

The collection was expanded through donations and digs carried out by the museum itself and the Nationale Dienst voor Opgravingen (National Department for Excavations). After public pressure for a new home for the collection, a new building by architect Alfredo de Gregorio was opened in 1994. This new building with new and expanded exhibition areas resulted in an increase in the number of visitors. The site was further expanded in 2006.

The permanent exhibition starts with the first humanoids in the region, the Neanderthals. It presents following cultures of hunters and several waves of farmers. The third floor is dedicated to the Gallo-Roman culture located in Tongeren. The exhibition closes with the first signs of Christianity.

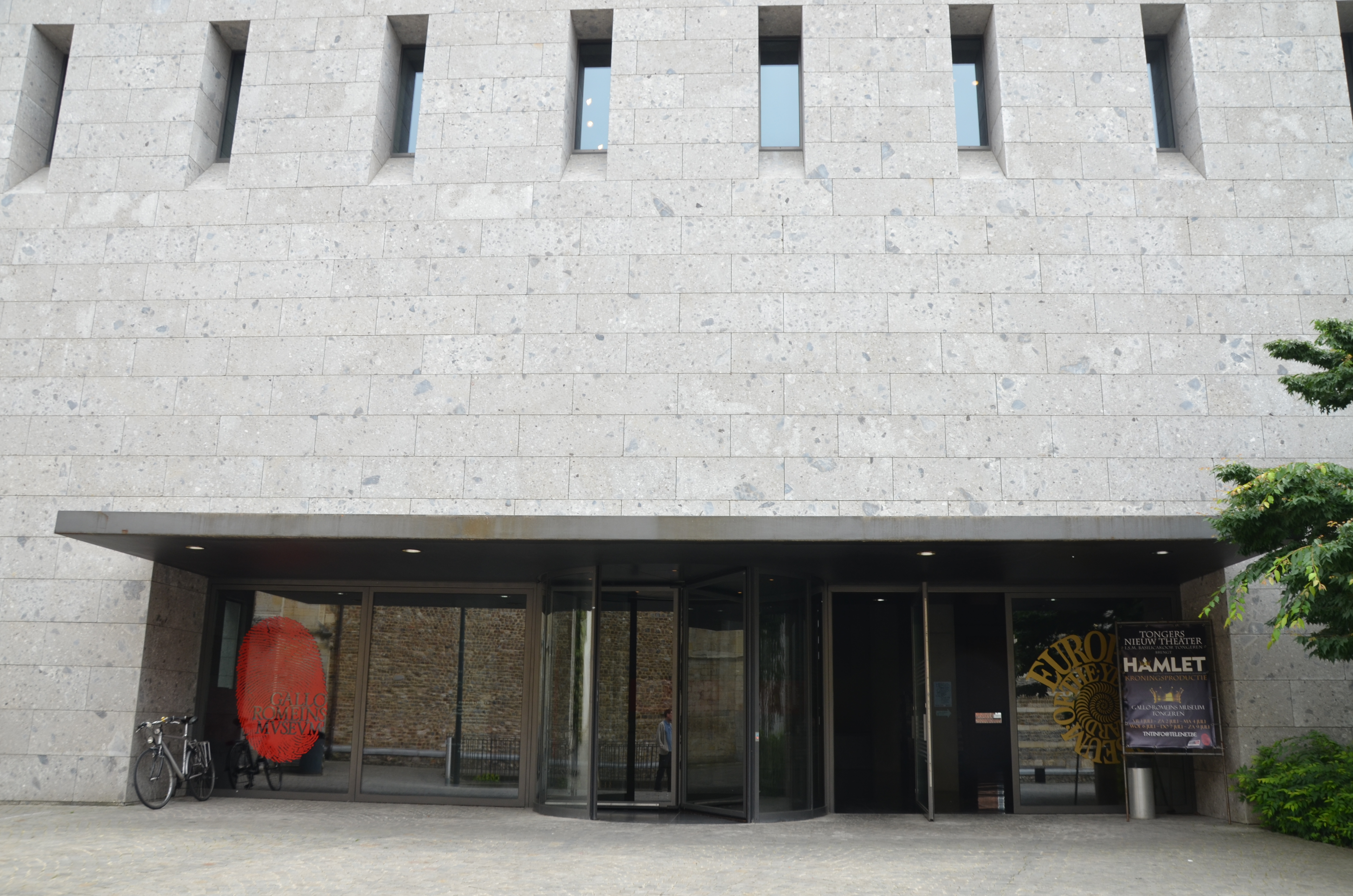
Gallo-Roman Museum of Tongeren

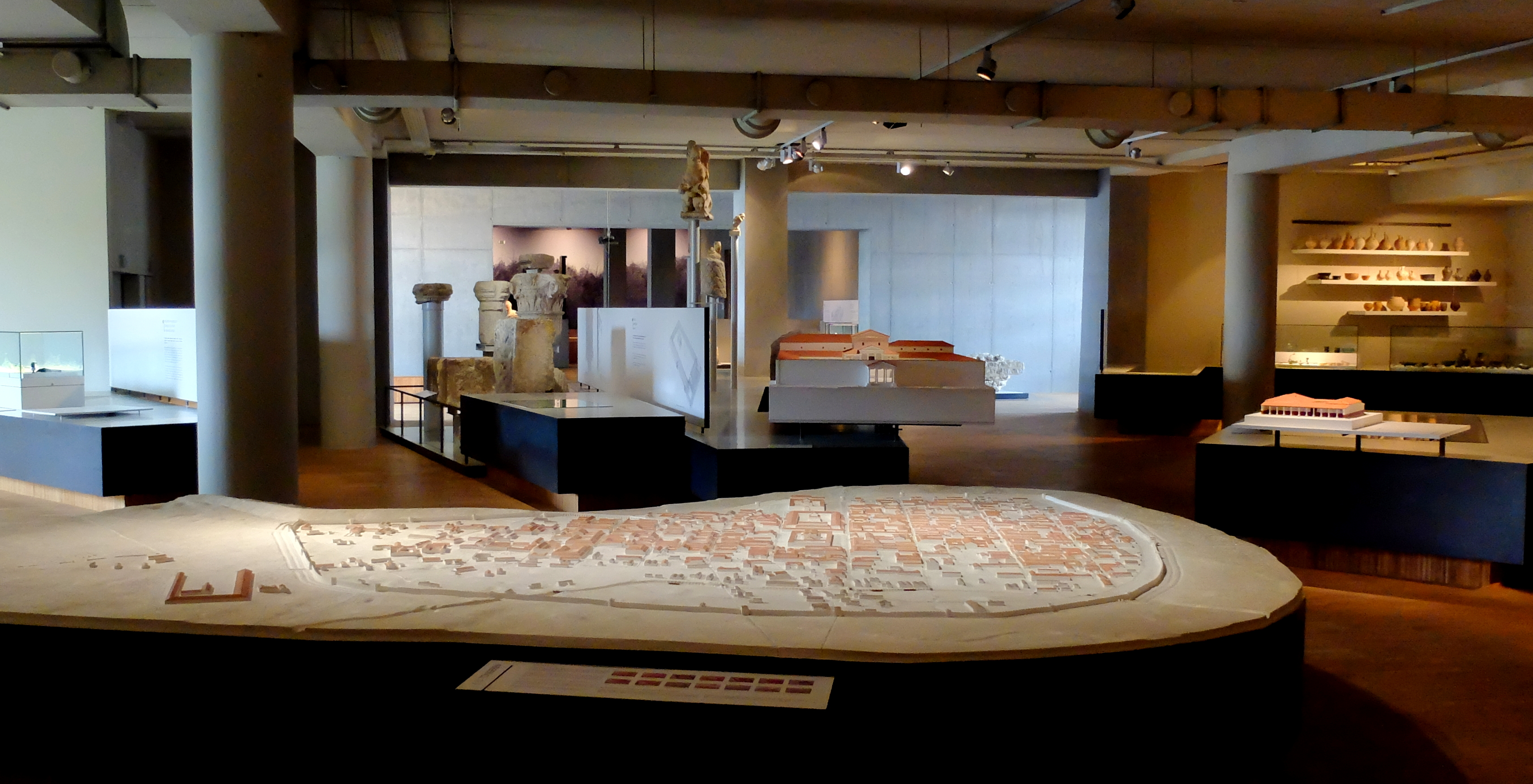
Model of Roman Tongeren

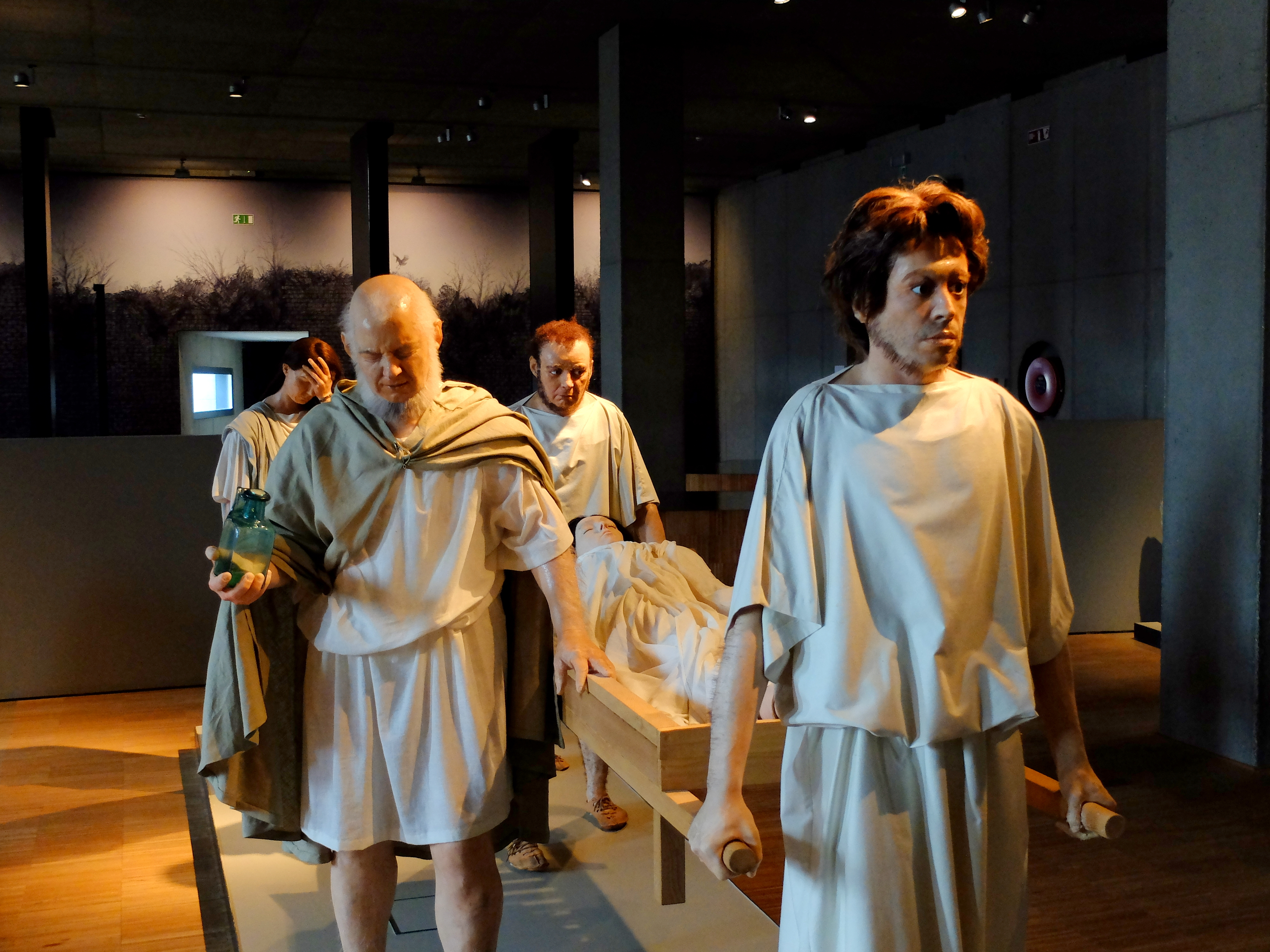
Roman citizens walking to a burial

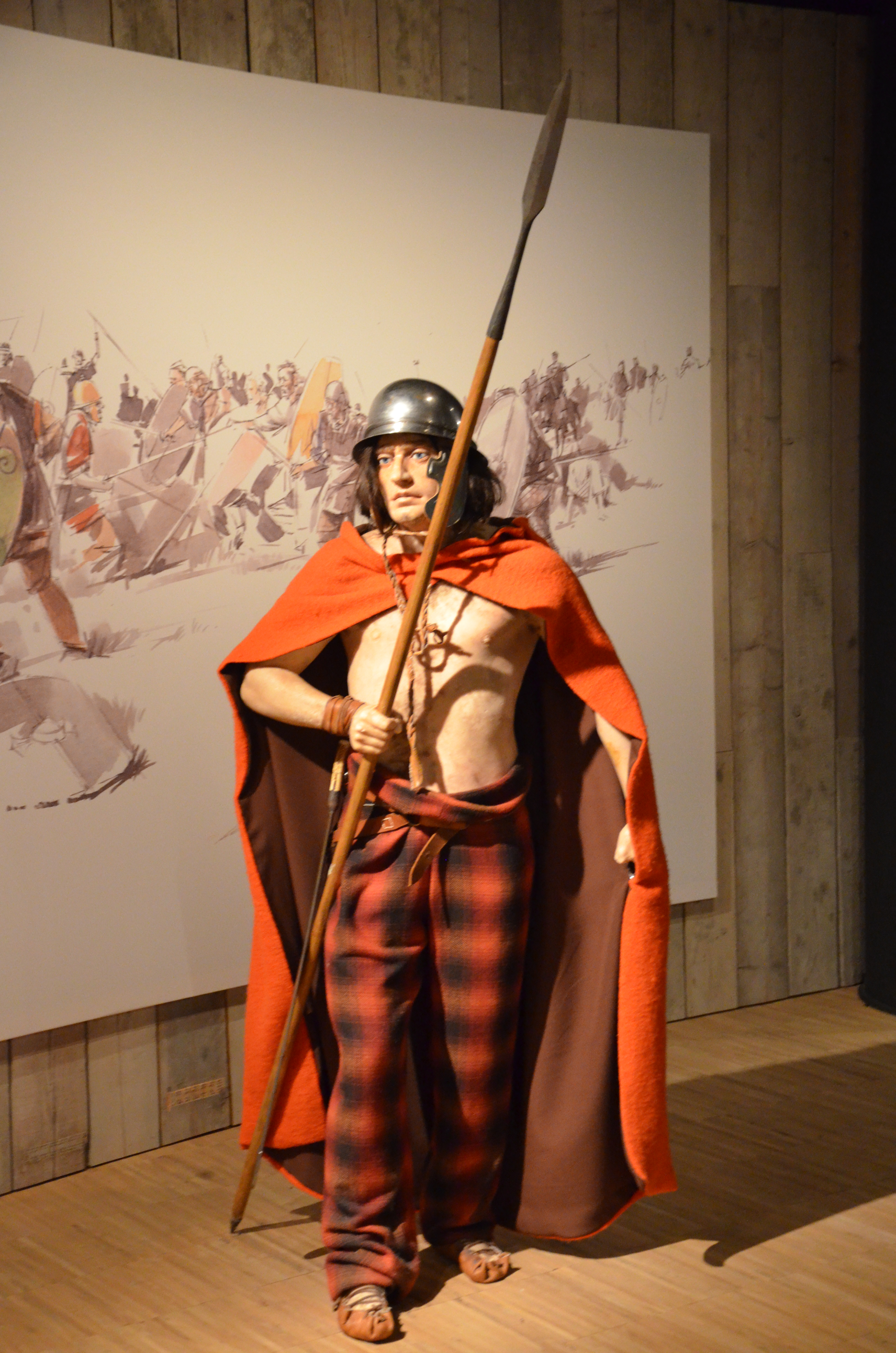
Gallic recruit to Roman Legions

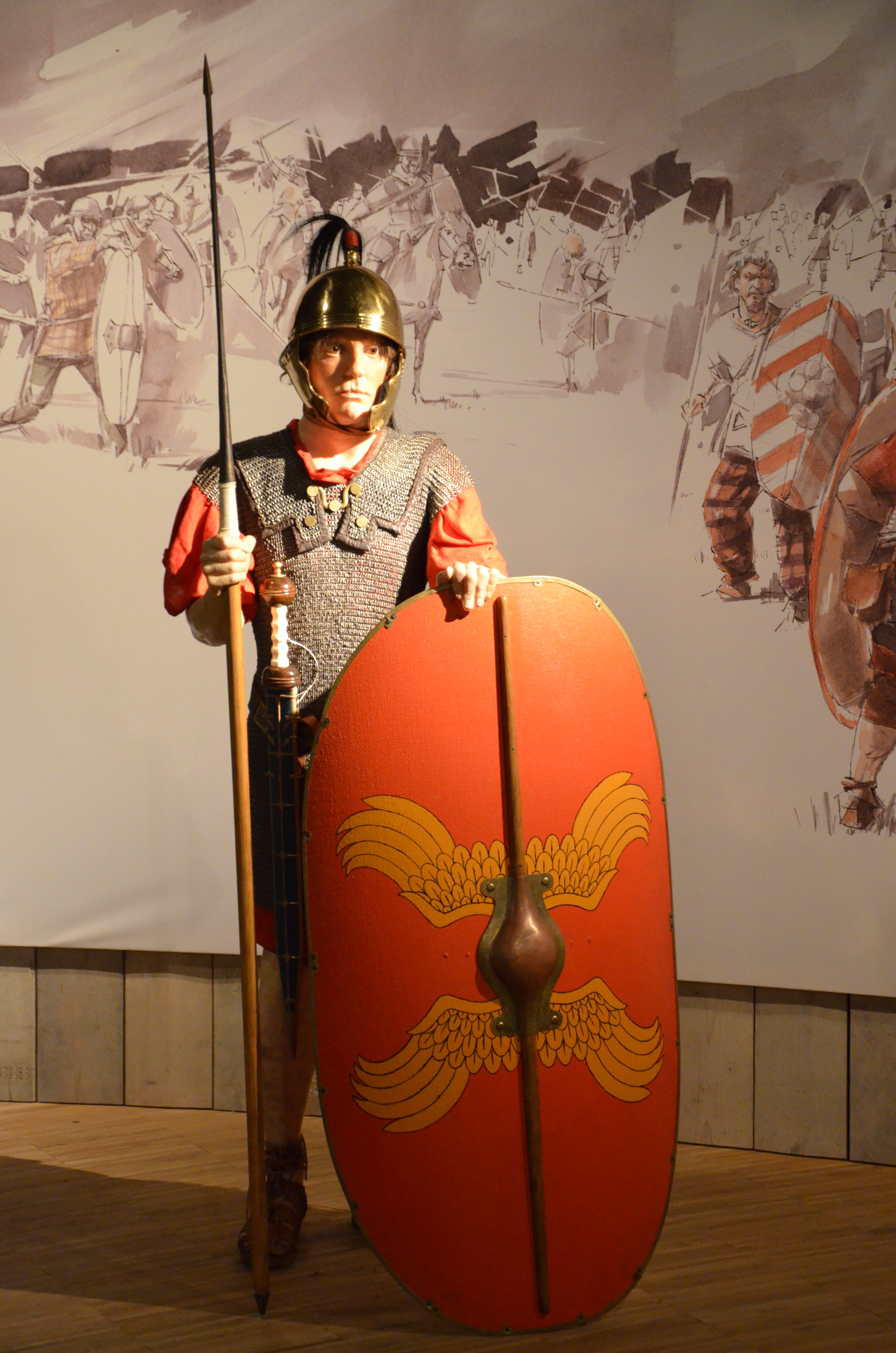
Roman Soldier

== Awards ==
In 2011, the museum was awarded the European Museum of the Year Award and was the first Belgian museum to receive this award.

In 2014 the museum was awarded the Museum Prize worth 5,000 euros. The jury praised the way in which "the Gallo-Roman Museum has been true to the discipline of archaeology in all its forms for many years". In addition, according to the jury, "the museum knows how to host exhibitions that reach a lot of the public and establishes a broad pedagogy with attention to different target groups".

In 2016, the museum won the Romulus Prize "for the massive efforts the museum provides to map Rome, Romans and ancient times in our country".

== Temporary exhibitions ==
- In 1995 the museum created an exhibition about the Neanderthals in Europa. It was later presented also in Hamburg, Germany.
- 2011: Ambiorix, King of the Eburones
- 2011/2012: Sagalassos, City of Dreams
- 2013: De Etrusken - Una storia particolare
- 2015: Gladiators - Heroes of the Colosseum
- 2016: Timeless Beauty (Artefacts and Photographs by Marc Lagrange).
- 2021: Face to face with the Romans
