= Daskalopetra monument =

Rock-cut shrine to the goddess Cybele

Coordinates: 38.4221°N 26.1336°E

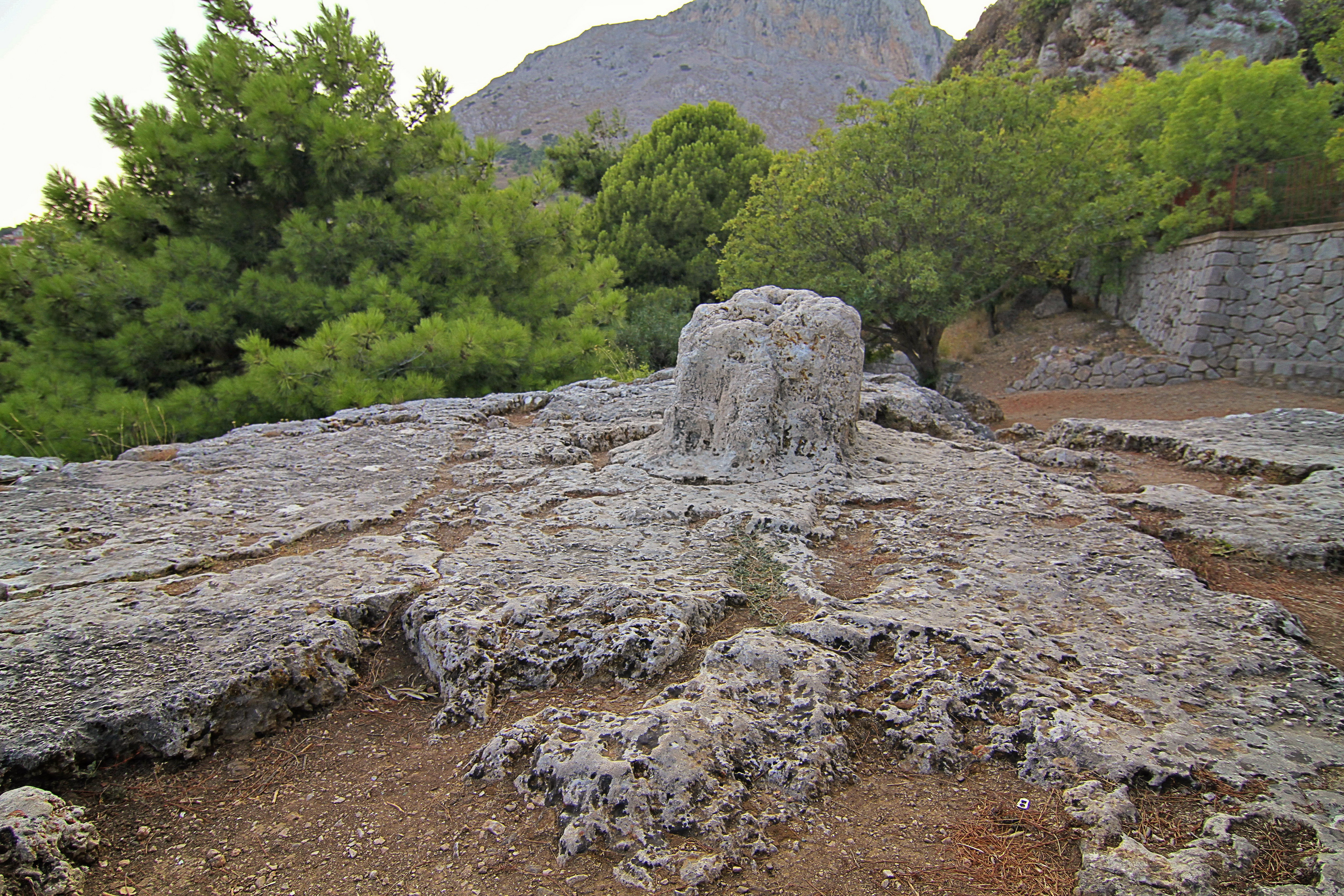
The monument in 2013

The Daskalopetra monument is a rock-cut shrine to the goddess Cybele at Daskalopetra, near Vrontados on Chios, in Greece, dating to the late sixth or early fifth century BC. It is probably the earliest known cult site of the Cybele in the Greek world.

== Description ==
The site is a natural rock formation which has been carved into the shape of a small shrine, located near a spring. This consists of a niche, containing a female figure, facing east. She sits with her feet on a footstool. Early travellers report that she held a lion on her lap, though the image is now so degraded that this is no longer visible. On either side of the niche there is a pillar, with a base in the form of a lion's paw. These support a low pediment. Each of the outer side walls of the niche bears relief sculpture of a striding lion. Opposite the niche is a rock-cut bench, which may have served as an altar. Two further rock-cut benches frame the space between the altar and the niche, on the north and south sides.

Although there are some votive offerings that are earlier, the Daskalopetra monument appears to be the earliest known cult site and image devoted to Cybele, a goddess who entered the Greek world from Phrygia in the sixth century BC. Several features are similar to depictions of Cybele in Phrygia, which are also carved into the rock face, framed by an architectural niche, and feature lions. However, the architectural features are in an Ionian Greek style.

== Bibliography ==
- Rubensohn, O.; Watzinger, C. (1928). "Die Daskalopetra auf Chios". Athenische Mitteilungen. 53: 109–116.
- Boardman, John (1959). "Chian and Early Ionic Architecture". Antiquaries Journal. 39 (3–4): 170–218. doi:10.1017/S0003581500083128. S2CID 164059218.
- Romano, I. B. (1980). Early Greek Cult Images (PhD). University of Pennsylvania. pp. 344–349.
- Naumann, F. (1983). Die Ikonographie der Kybele in der phrygischen und der griechischen Kunst. Tubingen. pp. 150–153.
- Graf, F (1985). Nordionische Kulte: Religionsgeschichtliche und epigraphische UNtersuchungen zu den Kulten von Chios, Erythrai, Klazomenai und Phokaia. Vevey.
- Roller, Lynn E. (1999). In search of god the mother : the cult of Anatolian Cybele. Berkeley, Calif.: University of California Press. ISBN 0520210247.
