= Quinta Claudia =

Roman aristocratic matron c. 204 BC

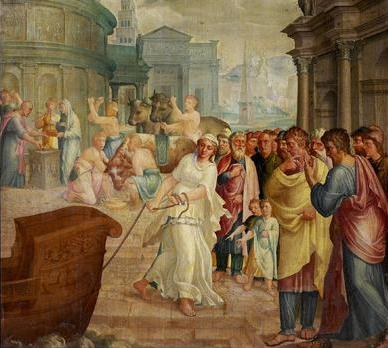
Quinta Claudia towing Cybele's ship, dressed as a Vestal Virgin. Painting by Lambert Lombard (16th century).

Quinta Claudia was a Roman matron said to have been instrumental in bringing the goddess Cybele, "Great Mother" of the gods from her shrine in Greek Asia Minor to Rome in 204 BC, during the last years of Rome's Second Punic War against Carthage. The goddess had been brought in response to dire prodigies, a failed harvest and the advice of various oracles. Roman histories and stories describe Quinta Claudia as castissima femina (purest or most virtuous woman) in Rome, chosen along with Scipio Nasica, Rome's optimus vir ("best man") to welcome the goddess.

== Biography ==
Gossips had accused Claudia of inchastity; but when the ship that carried the goddess's image up the River Tiber stuck fast on a sandbar, Claudia prayed for the goddess's help, then released and towed the ship single-handed. This miraculous feat proved Claudia's reputation and the goddess's willingness to become Rome's protector. Soon after, Rome had a good harvest, then defeated the Carthaginian leader Hannibal. Accounts of Cybele's arrival and her transformation into Rome's Magna Mater were embellished over time with circumstantial details, and formed part of the goddess's founding festival, Megalesia.

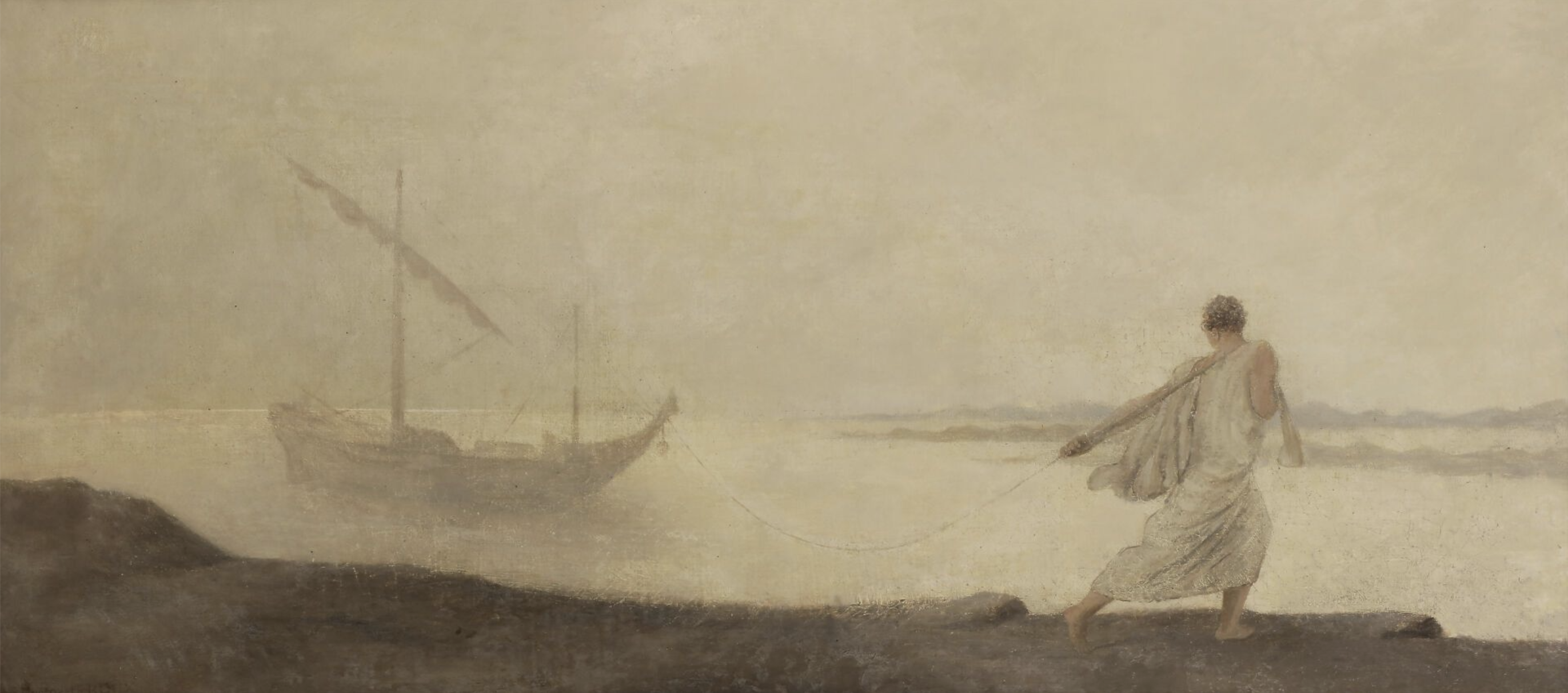
Claudia Quinta, by Hector Leroux (19th century).

These stories, and the pageants of Megalesia, were used to promote the goddess herself, traditional Roman values, and the status and reputation of Rome's ruling families. Magna Mater was conscripted to the Roman cause at a particularly unstable time in the city's history; the choice of Quinta and Scipio Nasica as the best of their kind may reflect their enrollment in a show of unity. Claudia's legend in particular became increasingly fantastical and embroidered, and cast idealised reflections on those who might be considered her descendants. In the Republican era, Cicero offered Claudia's exceptional reputation for pudicitia (sexual virtue) as the moral opposite to Clodia's, to undermine the latter's moral fitness to offer testimony against his client; and to accentuate the infamy of Clodia's brother Clodius, accused of deliberate sacrilege at Magna Mater's festival. The emperor Claudius claimed Claudia as an ancestor and may have promoted her cult, alongside that of Magna Mater and her divine consort, Attis. The emperor Augustus is said to have assured himself (wrongly) of his daughter Julia's chastity by reminding himself that she was descended from Quinta.

Most ancient sources describe Quinta as an aristocratic matron (a married woman and head of a household), who actively supports and defends her country's welfare, her personal reputation and that of her family. Cicero and later sources appear to have confused or conflated her with known Vestals of the Claudian family. Some images from the early Imperial era and onward show her in Vestal costume, highlighting her status as an Imperial paragon of morality and religious purity. She had at least one statue, in the vestibule of Magna Mater's Palatine temple; it was thought to have miraculously escaped two fires that had ruined the temple itself. Plaques and reliefs show her pulling the goddess's ship (which is identified as navis salvia, or "saviour ship" on a single inscription).

== See also ==
- Women in ancient Rome
- List of Roman women

== Bibliography ==
- Beard, Mary (1994). "The Roman and the Foreign: The Cult of the 'Great Mother'". In Thomas, Nicholas; Humphrey, Caroline (eds.). Imperial Rome. Shamanism, History, and the State. Ann Arbor, MI: University of Michigan. pp. 164–190.
- Gruen, Erich S. (1996). "The advent of the Magna Mater". Studies in Greek Culture and Roman Policy. University of California Press.
- Leach, Eleanor Windsor (2007). "Claudia Quinta (Pro Caelio 34) and an altar to Magna Mater". Dictynna (4). doi:10.4000/dictynna.157.
- Roller, Lynn Emrich (1999). In Search of God the Mother: The cult of Anatolian Cybele. Berkeley and Los Angeles, California: University of California Press. ISBN 0-520-21024-7.
