= Taurobolium =

Practice of a ritual sacrifice of a bull

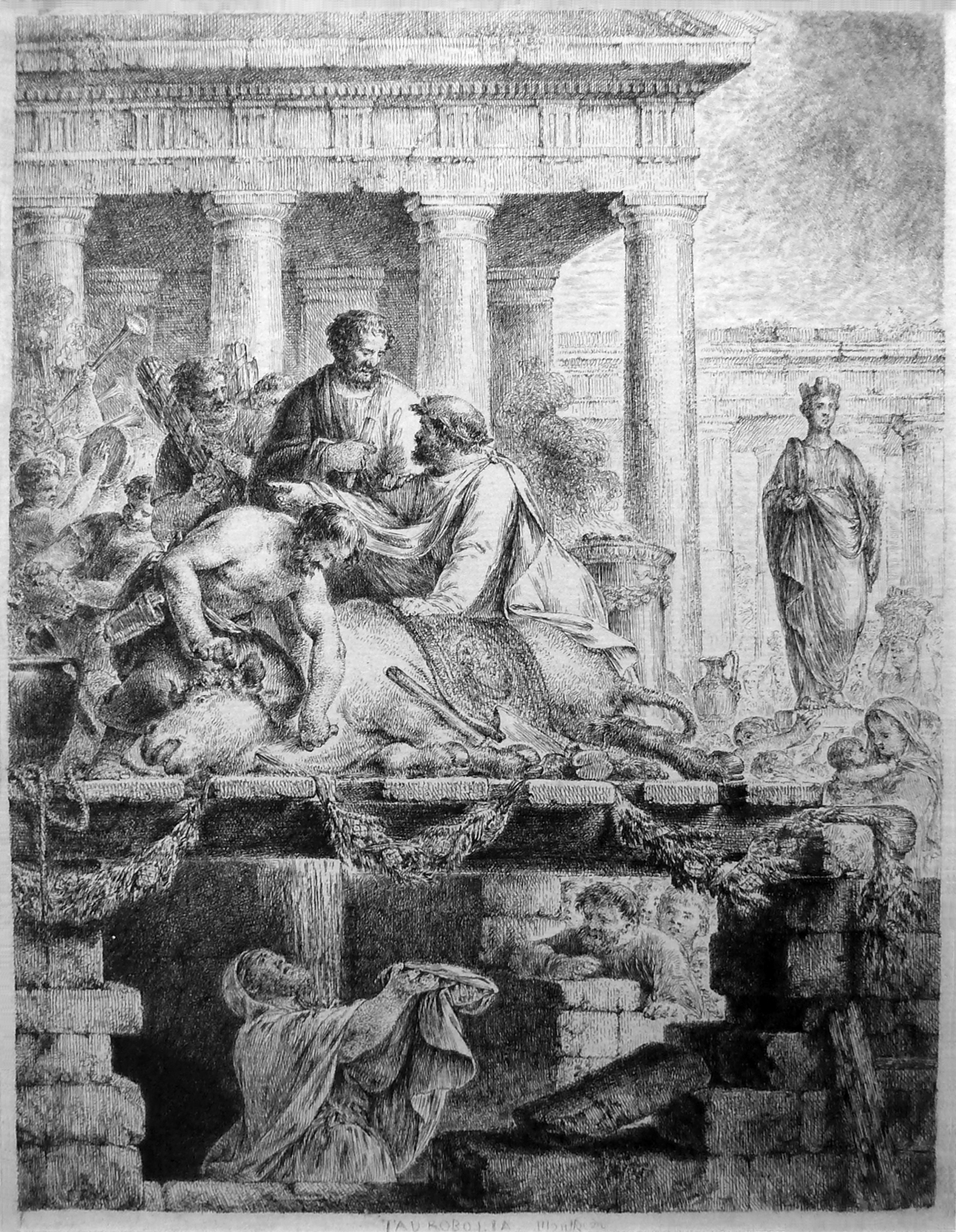
Taurobolium, or Consecration of the Priests of Cybele under Antoninus Pius. Engraving by Bernhard Rode c.1780

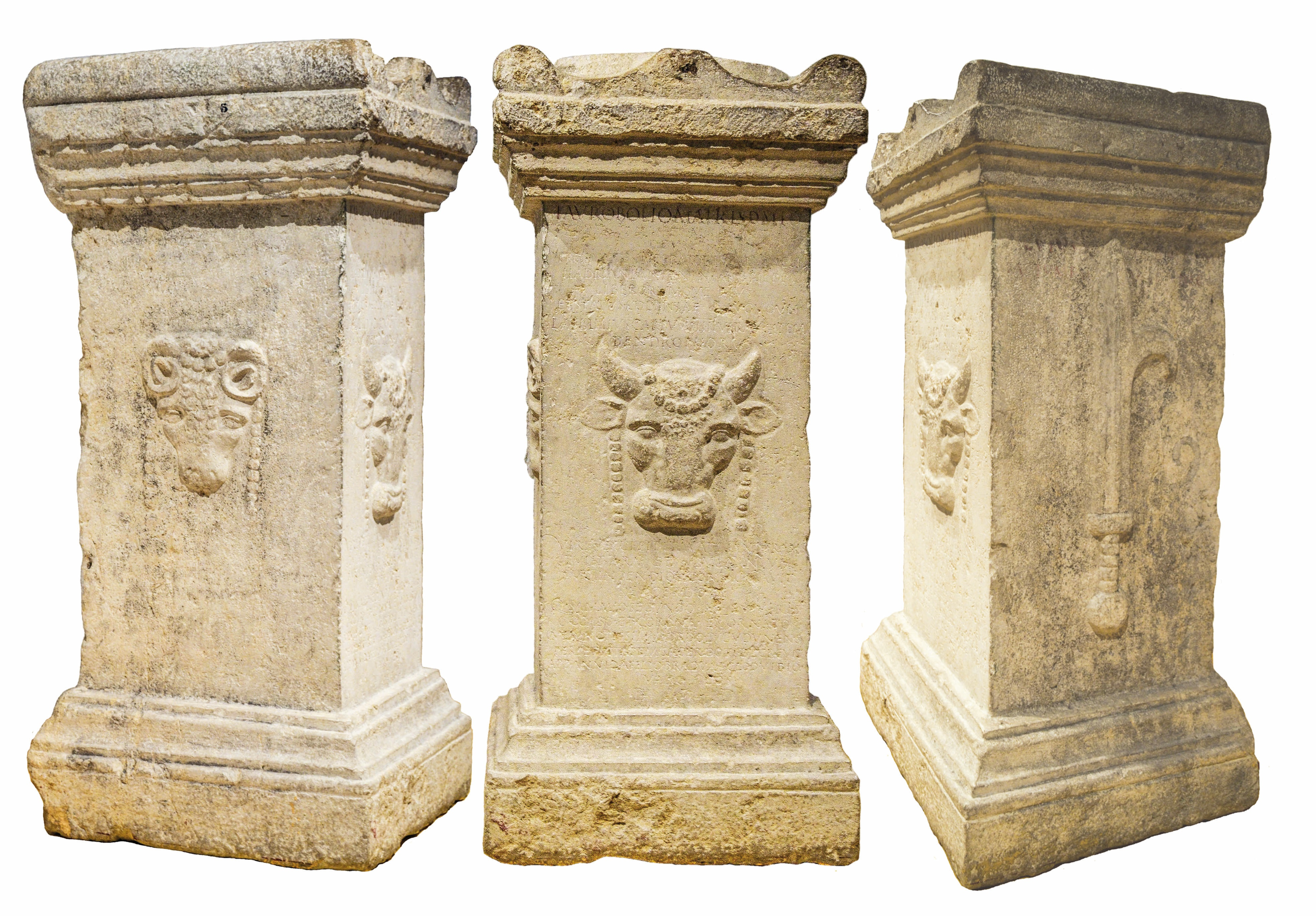
Three sides of a taurobolium altar showing bucrania and a sacrificial knife, with a dedication to the Great Idaean Mother of the Gods, from Lugdunum (Lyon)

In the Roman Empire of the second to fourth centuries, taurobolium referred to practices involving the sacrifice of a bull, which after mid-second century became connected with the worship of Cybele, the Great Mother of the Gods. Though not previously limited to her cult, after AD 159 all private taurobolia inscriptions mention the Magna Mater.

== History ==
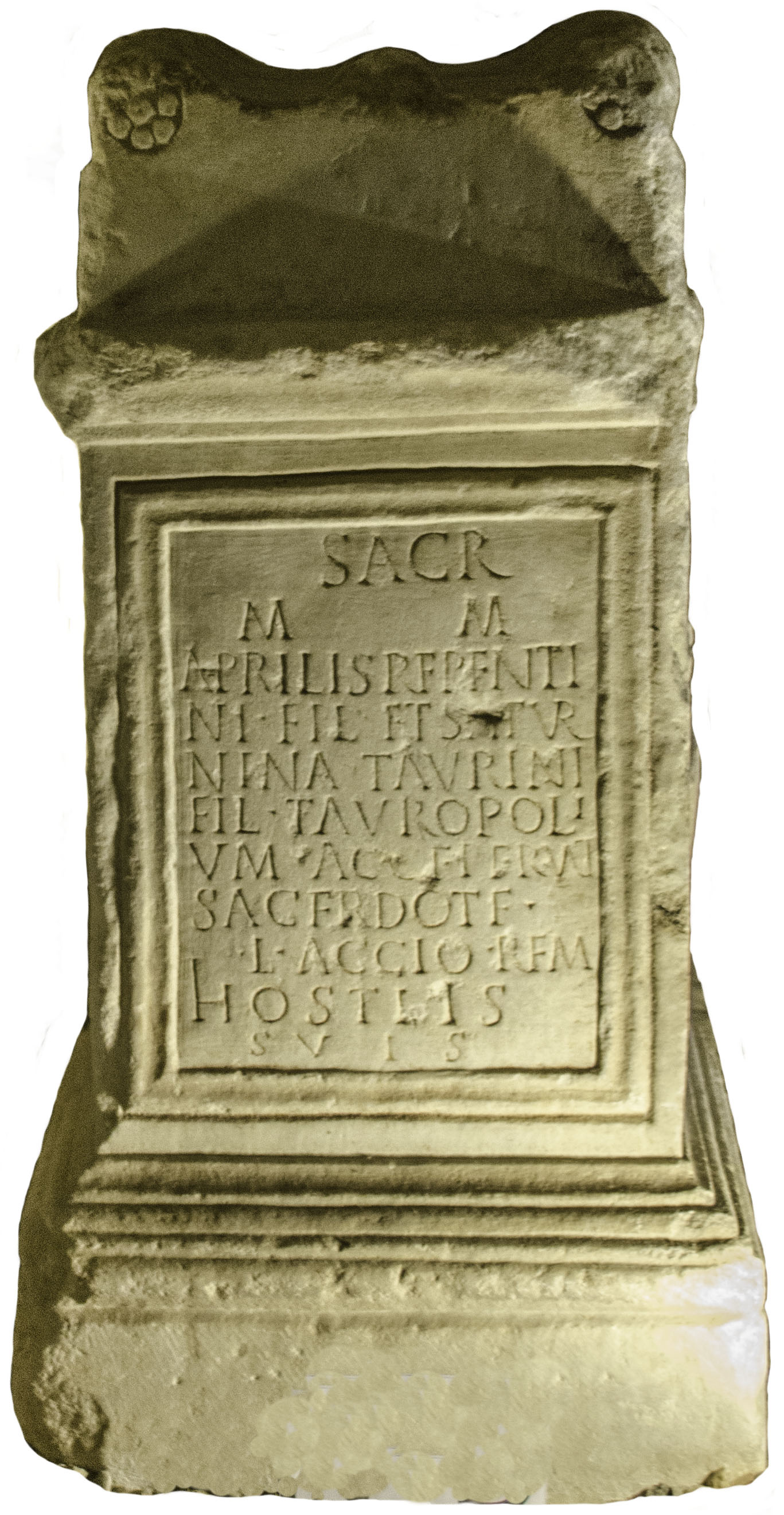
One of the 20 taurobolium altars in Musée Eugène-Camoreyt in Lectoure (France)

Originating in Asia Minor, its earliest attested performance in Italy occurred in AD 134, at Puteoli, in honor of Venus Caelestis, as documented by an inscription.

The earliest inscriptions, of the second century in Asia Minor, point to a bull chase in which the animal was overcome, linked with a panegyris in honour of a deity or deities, but not an essentially religious ceremony, though a bull was sacrificed and its flesh distributed. The addition of the taurobolium and the institution of an archigallus were innovations in the cult of the Magna Mater made by Antoninus Pius on the occasion of his vicennalia, the twentieth year of his reign, in 158 and 159. The first dated reference to Magna Mater in a taurobolium inscription dates from 160. The vires, or testicles of the bull, were removed from Rome and dedicated at a taurobolium altar at Lugdunum, 27 November 160. Jeremy Rutter makes the suggestion that the bull's testicles substituted for the self-castration of devotees of Cybele, abhorrent to the Roman ethos.

Public taurobolia, enlisting the benevolence of the Magna Mater on behalf of the emperor, became common in Italy, as well as in Gaul, Hispania and Africa. The last public taurobolium for which there is an inscription was carried out for Diocletian and Maximian at Mactar in Numidia at the close of the third century.

== Description ==
The best-known and most vivid description, though of the quite different taurobolium as it was revived in aristocratic pagan circles, is the notorious one that has coloured early scholarship, which was provided in an anti-pagan poem by the late 4th-century Christian Prudentius in Peristephanon: the priest of the Great Mother, clad in a silk toga worn in the Gabinian cincture, with golden crown and fillets on his head, takes his place in a trench covered by a platform of planks pierced with fine holes, on which a bull, magnificent with flowers and gold, is slain. The blood rains through the platform onto the priest below, who receives it on his face, and even on his tongue and palate, and after the baptism presents himself before his fellow-worshippers purified and regenerated, and receives their salutations and reverence. Prudentius does not explicitly mention the taurobolium, but the ceremony, in its new form, is unmistakable from other contemporaneous sources: "At Novaesium on the Rhine in Germania Inferior, a blood pit was found in what was probably a Metroon", Jeremy Rutter observes.

Recent scholarship has called into question the reliability of Prudentius' description. It is a late account by a Christian who was hostile to paganism, and may have distorted the rite for effect. Earlier inscriptions that mention the rite suggest a less gory and elaborate sacrificial rite. Therefore, Prudentius' description may be based on a late evolution of the taurobolium.

== Ritual ==
In the taurobolium ritual, the highpriest would stand in a pit. A bull would be led onto a platform above the pit and sacrificed by cutting its throat. The blood of the bull would pour down onto the priest, showering him in the blood. Afterward, the bull's testicles were removed and taken to the sanctuary as an offering. This ritual was performed as a replacement for the castration of high priests because the castration of Roman citizens was forbidden.

== Purpose ==
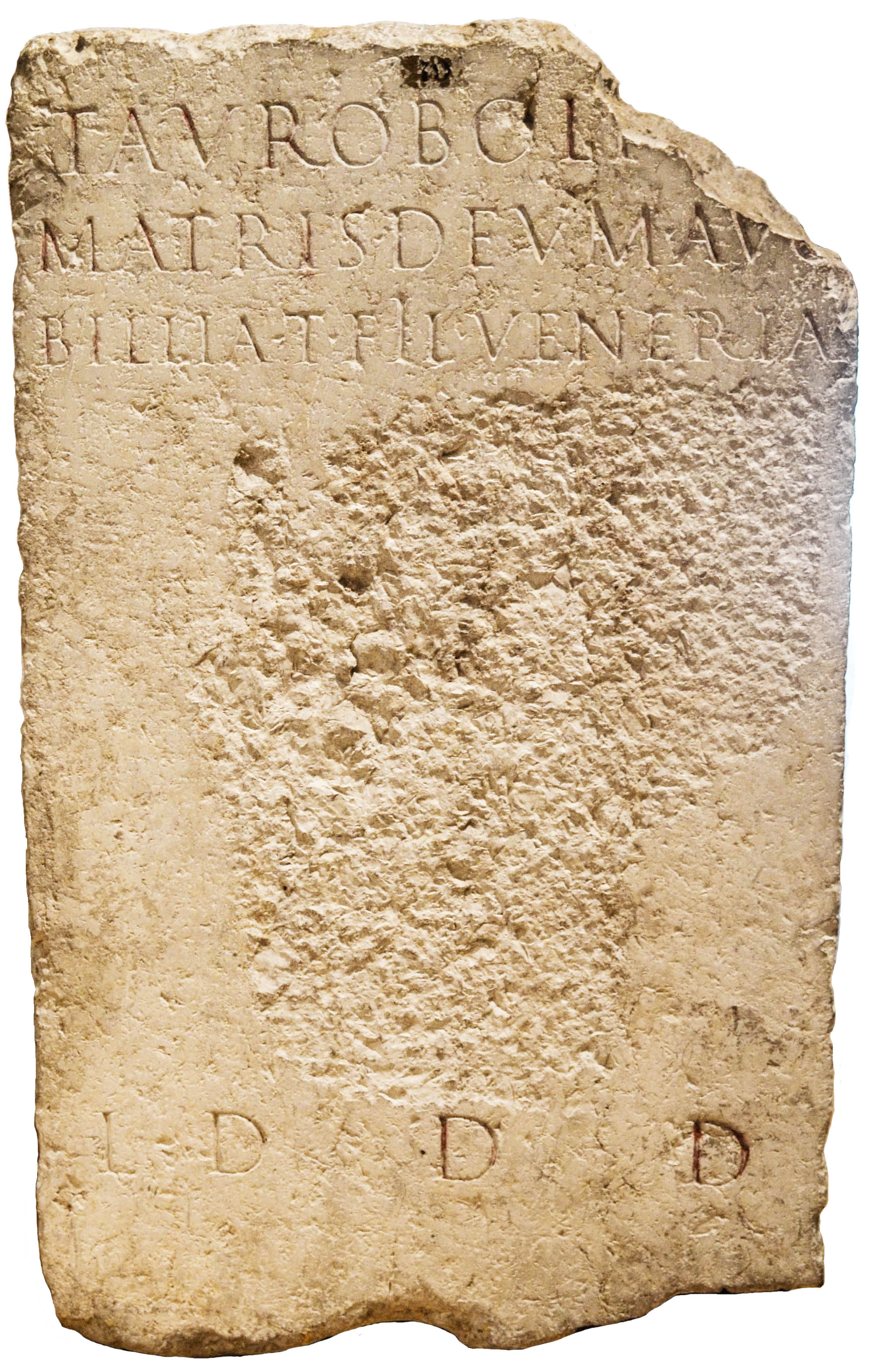
Eroded inscription commemorating a taurobolium for the Magna Mater

The taurobolium in the second and third centuries was usually performed as a measure for the welfare (salus) of the emperor, Empire, or community; H. Oppermann denies early reports that its date was frequently 24 March, the Dies Sanguinis ("Day of Blood") of the annual festival of the Great Mother Cybele and Attis; Oppermann reports that there were no taurobolia in late March. In the late third and the fourth centuries its usual motive was the purification or regeneration of an individual, who was spoken of as renatus in aeternum, "reborn for eternity", in consequence of the ceremony. While its efficacy was not eternal, its effect was considered to endure for twenty years, as if the magic coating of the blood wore off after that time, the initiate having taken his vows for "the circle of twenty years" (bis deni orbis). It was also performed as the fulfilment of a vow (votum), or by command of the goddess herself, and the privilege was not limited by sex or class. In its fourth-century revival in high pagan circles, Rutter has observed, "We might even justifiably say that the taurobolium, rather than a rite effectual in itself was a symbol of paganism. It was a rite apparently forbidden by the Christian emperors and thus became a hallmark of the pagan nobility in their final struggle against Christianity and the Christian emperors." The place of its performance at Rome was near the site of St Peter's, in the excavations of which several altars and inscriptions commemorative of taurobolia were discovered.

A criobolium, substituting a ram for the bull, was also practiced, sometimes together with the taurobolium;.

== Modern interpretation ==
The classicist Grant Showerman, writing in the Encyclopædia Britannica Eleventh Edition suggested: "The taurobolium was probably a sacred drama symbolizing the relations of the Mother and Attis (q.v.). The descent of the priest into the sacrificial foss (pit) symbolized the death of Attis, the withering of the vegetation of Mother Earth; his bath of blood and emergence the restoration of Attis, the rebirth of vegetation. The ceremony may be the spiritualized descent of the primitive oriental practice of drinking or being baptized in the blood of an animal, based upon a belief that the strength of brute creation could be acquired by consumption of its substance or contact with its blood. In spite of the phrase renatus in aeternum, there is no reason to suppose that the ceremony was in any way borrowed from Christianity."

== See also ==
- Tauroctony
- Tauromachy
- Taurocathapsy
