= Criobolium =

Criobolium is the ritual sacrifice of a ram in the cult of Attis and the Great Mother of the Gods. It seems to have been a special ceremony instituted after the rise, and on the analogy of the taurobolium, which was performed in honor of the Great Mother, for the purpose of giving fuller recognition to Attis in the duality which he formed with the Mother. There is no evidence of its existence either in Asia or in Italy before the taurobolium came into prominence (after AD 134). When the criobolium was performed in conjunction with the taurobolium, the altar was almost invariably inscribed to both the Mother and Attis, while the inscription was to the Mother alone when the taurobolium only was performed. The celebration of the criobolium was widespread, and its importance such that it was sometimes performed in place of the taurobolium (Corp. Inscr. Lat. vi. 505, 506). The details and effect of the ceremony were no doubt similar to those of the taurobolium.
