= Automotive acronyms and abbreviations =

The following items are commonly used automotive acronyms and abbreviations:

- 5MT: 5-speed manual transmission
- A4: 4-speed automatic transmission
- A5: 5-speed automatic transmission
- A6: 6-speed automatic transmission
- ABS: Anti-lock braking system
- AC: Alternating Current
- A/C: Air conditioning
- ADAS: Advanced Driving Autonomous Systems
- ADB: Adaptive Driving Beam
- AdvHEV: Hybrid vehicle
- AGS: Adaptive transmission control
- AHC: Automatic height controller
- AMT: Automated manual transmission
- AFL: Adaptive front light
- AFS: Adaptive front-light system
- ALH: Adaptive LED Headlights
- ATLS: Automated truck loading systems
- Autogas: LPG when used as a vehicle fuel
- AVT: Antenna Amplifier Tuner
- AWD: All Wheel Drive
- BSM: Blind spot monitor
- CAB 1493: California Assembly Bill 1493
- CARB: California Air Resources Board
- CCP: Coupled cam phasing
- CNG: Compressed natural gas
- CTS: Cruising & Traffic Support
- CVVL: Continuous variable valve lift
- CVT: Continuously variable transmission
- DAA: Driver Attention Alert
- DC: Direct current
- DCP: Dual cam phasing
- DCT: Dual clutch transmission
- DeAct: Cylinder deactivation
- dHCCI: Diesel homogeneous charge compression ignition
- DMV: Department of Motor Vehicles
- DOHC: Dual overhead cam
- DRL: Daytime Running Lights
- DRSS: Distance Recognition Support System
- DSC: Dynamic stability control
- DVVL: Discrete variable valve lift
- DVVLd: Discrete variable valve lift, includes dual cam phasing
- DVVLi: Discrete variable valve lift, includes intake valve cam phasing
- eACC: Improved electric accessories
- EAT: Electronically assisted turbocharging
- EFI: Electronic Fuel Injection
- EGR: Exhaust gas recirculation
- ehCVA: Electrohydraulic camless valve actuation
- emCVA: Electromagnetic camless valve actuation
- EHPS: Electrohydraulic power steering
- EPB: Electronic Parking Brake
- EPS: Electric power steering
- EMFAC: Emission Factors Model, ARB emission factors modeling software
- ESC: Electronic stability control
- ESP: Electronic stability program
- EWP: Electric water pump
- EWP: Elevating work platform
- FDC: Fixed displacement compressor
- FWD: Front-wheel drive
- FTP: Federal test procedure
- g/mi: Grams per mile
- GDI: Gasoline direct injection
- GDI-S: Stoichiometric gasoline direct injection
- GDI-L: Lean-burn gasoline direct injection
- gHCCI: Gasoline homogeneous charge compression ignition
- GHG: Greenhouse gas
- GT: Grand Tourer
- GVW: Gross vehicle weight
- GVWR: Gross vehicle weight rating
- GWP: Global warming potential
- HAD: Highly Autonomous Driving
- HBC: High Beam Control
- HC: Hydrocarbons
- HEV: Hybrid-electric vehicle
- HFC: Hydrofluorocarbon
- HP: Horsepower
- HSDI: High-speed (diesel) direct injection
- HUD: Automotive head-up display
- ICP: Intake cam phaser
- IGN: Ignition
- ImpAlt: Improved efficiency alternator
- IRVM: Inside Rear View Mirror
- ISG: Integrated starter-generator system
- ISG-SS: Integrated starter-generator system with start-stop operation
- L4: Straight four (Inline four) engine
- LDT: Light-duty truck
- LDT1: a light-duty truck with a loaded vehicle weight of up to 3750 pounds.
- LDT2: an LEV II light-duty truck with a loaded vehicle weight of 3751 pounds to a gross vehicle weight of 8500 pounds
- LED: Light Emitting Diode
- LEV: Low-emission vehicle
- LPG: Liquified petroleum gas
- LVW: Loaded vehicle weight
- MAC: Mobile air conditioning
- MDPV: Medium-duty passenger vehicle
- MDV: Medium-duty vehicle
- mg/mi: Milligrams per mile
- MHEV: Mild Hybrid Electric Vehicle
- MT: Manual Transmission
- NMOG: Non-methane organic gas
- NOx: Oxides of nitrogen
- ORVM: Outside Rear View (Side View) Mirror
- PB: Power brakes
- PC: Passenger car
- RPM: Revolutions Per Minute
- PS: Power steering
- R-134a: Refrigerant 134a (1,1,1,2-Tetrafluoroethane)
- R-152a: Refrigerant 152a (1,1-Difluoroethane)
- RCTA: Rear Cross Traffic Alert
- RPE: Retail price equivalent
- RWD: Rear Wheel Drive
- SULEV: Super ultra low emission vehicle
- SUV: Sport utility vehicle
- TBI: Throttle body injection
- TCS: Traction control system
- TRR: Tire rolling resistance
- TSR: Traffic Sign Recognition
- Turbo: Turbocharger
- ULEV: Ultra low emission vehicle
- V6: "V" shaped 6-cylinder engine
- V8: "V" shaped 8-cylinder engine
- VDC: Variable displacement compressor
- VVT: Variable Valve Timing
- ZEV: Zero-emission vehicle
- 4WD: Four-wheel drive
- 42V ISG: 42-volt integrated starter-generator system
