= ATL =

ATL may refer to:

== Places ==
- Atlanta, the capital and most populous city of the U.S. state of Georgia
  - Hartsfield–Jackson Atlanta International Airport (IATA airport code)
  - Peachtree station (Amtrak station code)
- Attleborough railway station, in Norfolk, England (National Rail code)

== Media ==
- ATL (film), a 2006 film set in the city of Atlanta, Georgia, United States
- Across the Line (radio show), a BBC Northern Ireland music brand
- ATL (band), an R&B boy band
- Above the Law (group), a Los Angeles–based rap group
- All Time Low, a pop punk band from Lutherville-Timonium, Maryland
- Among the Living, an album by heavy metal band Anthrax

== Technology ==
- Advanced Tactical Laser, a US military program to mount a laser weapon on an aircraft for use against ground targets
- Americans for Technology Leadership, an organization that advocates limited government regulation of technology
- Active Template Library, from Microsoft
- ATLAS Transformation Language, a QVT model transformation language for model-driven engineering
- A retired US Navy hull classification symbol: Atlantic tank landing ship (ATL)
- AT-L, Soviet artillery tractor
- ATL (Amperex Technology Limited), a Chinese battery manufacturing company
- Avion Très Léger or Robin ATL, a light aircraft manufactured by Avions Pierre Robin

== Other ==
- Adult T-cell leukemia, a rare cancer of the immune system's own T-cells
- Air Atlantic, ICAO code ATL
- Alternating-time Temporal Logic, a branching-time temporal logic that naturally describes computations of multi-agent system and multiplayer games
- Anti-Terrorism Law, a law that aims to prevent, prohibit, and penalize terrorism in the Philippines
- Association of Teachers and Lecturers, an education union in the UK
- Atlanta, Georgia's major professional sports teams:
  - Atlanta Braves, the city's Major League Baseball team
  - Atlanta Falcons, the city's National Football League team
  - Atlanta Hawks, the city's National Basketball Association team
  - Atlanta United FC, a Major League Soccer team
- The ATL proposed rebrand of Metropolitan Atlanta Rapid Transit Authority (MARTA)
- Azienda Trasporti Livornese, former Livorno bus transport company

== See also ==
- Above the line (disambiguation)
- alt.* hierarchy
- Atlantic
- Atlantis
- Atlas
- Atlatl
- Dr. Atl (1875–1964), Mexican painter and writer
- ATLS (disambiguation)
- TL (disambiguation)
- at1 (disambiguation)
- ati (disambiguation)
