= BTL =

BTL may refer to:

== General abbreviations ==
- Bachelor of Talmudic Law, an academic degree
- Bilateral tubal ligation, a medical procedure
- Biomass to liquid, synthesize of fuel from biomass
- Bridge-tied load, an output configuration for audio amplifiers
- Buy-to-let, a UK property investment strategy

== Location codes ==
- Battle Creek (Amtrak station), Amtrak station code BTL, Battle Creek, Michigan
- Schönefeld (bei Berlin) station, DS100 code BTL, Brandenburg, Germany
- W. K. Kellogg Airport, IATA identifier BTL, Battle Creek, Michigan

== Companies ==
- BACnet Testing Laboratories
- Belize Telecommunications Limited
- Bell Telephone Laboratories
- Between the Lines Books, Canadian publisher
- BTL Brands, developer of McCoy's (crisp)

== See also ==
- Below the line (disambiguation)
