= AT =

AT or at may refer to:

== Language ==
- At, a preposition
- At (cuneiform), a cuneiform sign

== Science and technology ==
=== Biology and medicine ===
- Anaerobic threshold, in physiology
- Análisis transaccional (Spanish for "transactional analysis"), a psychological method
- Antithrombin, a small protein molecule
- Ataxia–telangiectasia, an immunodeficiency disorder
- Athletic training
- Atrial tachycardia
- Aliança da Terra, a Brazilian NGO that promotes environmental awareness and land management practices

=== Computing ===
- .at, the Internet ccTLD for Austria
- @ (or "at sign"), the punctuation symbol now typically used in e-mail addresses and tweets
- at (command), used to schedule tasks or other commands to be performed or run at a certain time
- IBM Personal Computer/AT
  - AT (form factor) for motherboards and computer cases
  - AT connector, a five-pin DIN connector for a keyboard
- AT Protocol, a decentralized social networking protocol by Bluesky
- The Hayes command set for computer modems (each command begins with the character string "AT")

=== Physics and chemistry ===
- Astatine (symbol At), a chemical element
- Ampere-turn (symbol A t), an International System of Units (MKS) unit of magnetomotive force
- Attotesla (symbol aT), 10^{−18} tesla, an SI derived unit of magnetic flux density
- Technical atmosphere (symbol at), a physical unit of pressure

=== Other uses in science and technology ===
- Acceptance testing, in engineering
- Appropriate technology, an ideological movement to scale technology to be appropriate to its context
- Assistive technology, devices for people with disabilities
- Audiotool, a digital audio workstation

== Transportation and military ==
- Automatic transmission, in vehicles
- Auckland Transport, New Zealand, a public transport agency
- Autolinee Toscane, Italy, a public transport agency
- Royal Air Maroc (IATA airline designator AT)
- A US Navy hull classification symbol: Fleet tug (AT)
- Aviation electronics technician (United States Navy), a job specialty
- Anti-tank warfare

== Business ==
- At, 1/100 of a Lao kip, a unit of currency
- AT (Ukrainian: Акціонерне товариство), a Ukrainian form of company, equivalent to joint-stock company

== Political parties ==
- Awami Tahreek, a left-wing Pakistani political party
- Labor Organisation of Brothers-in-Arms (Finnish: Aseveljien Työjärjestö), a political party in Finland

== Places ==
- Austria, a country in Central Europe, by ISO 3166 alpha-2 code
- Atchison County, Kansas, United States (county code)
- The Appalachian Trail (A.T.), a 2,180+ mile long mountainous trail in the Eastern United States
- Antigua and Barbuda, World Meteorological Organization country code
- Ashmore and Cartier Islands (FIPS 10-4 territory code, and obsolete NATO country code)
- At, Bihar, village in Aurangabad district of Bihar, India
- Province of Asti, Italy (ISO 3166-2:IT code)
- Australia, LOC MARC code

== Other uses ==
- Aarne–Thompson classification system, used to classify folktales
- Archive Team, a digital preservation group
- Alternative Tentacles, an independent record label

== See also ==
- AT1 (disambiguation)
- ATS (disambiguation)
