= ATS =

ATS or Ats may refer to:

== Businesses ==
- ATS Wheels (Auto Technisches Spezialzubehör), a German wheel manufacturer and sponsor of a Formula One racing team
- ATS Automation Tooling Systems, an Ontario, Canada-based factory automation company
- ATS Euromaster, a European tyre service supplier
- Automobili Turismo e Sport, an Italian automotive manufacturer and Formula One car constructor
- AT&S (WBAG ticker symbol ATS)

== Economics and finance ==
- Alternative trading system, SEC classification in US equity trading
- Austrian schilling (ISO 4217 currency code: ATS), former currency of Austria
- Automated trading system, a computer program that creates and submits orders to a financial exchange

== Law ==
- Alien Tort Statute, a US law
- Antarctic Treaty System, regulating Antarctica
  - Antarctic Treaty Secretariat, the associated organisation based in Argentina
- Australian Treaty Series

== Organizations ==
- Adventist Theological Society, a nonprofit organization of Seventh-day Adventists
- American Temperance Society, a former US organization
- American Thoracic Society, a medical society
- American Tract Society, a nonprofit religious publishing house
- Antique Telescope Society, US
- Swiss Telegraphic Agency (Agence télégraphique suisse), a non-profit press agency of Switzerland

=== Education ===
- Ai Tong School, a primary school in Singapore
- Asian Theological Seminary, seminary in the Philippines
- Association of Theological Schools in the United States and Canada
- Association of Trust Schools, in Zimbabwe

=== Military and law enforcement ===
- Anti-Terrorism Squad, India
- Anti-Terrorist Squad, former name of the Special Tactics Group, New Zealand
- Auxiliary Territorial Service, World War II women's branch of the British Army

== Science and technology ==
- Aerobic treatment system, for sewage
- Ammonium thiosulfate, a compound
- Amphetamine transdermal system, in medicine
- Applications Technology Satellite, an experimental fleet of satellites launched by NASA
- Arterial tortuosity syndrome, a connective tissue disease
- Automatic transfer switch, which switches an electricity supply to a standby source

=== Computing ===
- Apache Traffic Server, a reverse proxy and forward proxy server
- Applicant tracking system, recruitment software
- App Transport Security, part of iOS
- ATS (programming language) (Applied Type System)
- Automate the Schools, school administration system in New York City, US
- Automated Targeting System, used to identify entrants to the US who may be criminals
- Automated trading system, a computer program that creates and submits orders to a financial exchange
- IBM Administrative Terminal System, an office system providing word processing and e-mail from 2741 terminals.

== Transportation ==
- Air traffic service, a service which regulates and assists aircraft in real-time to ensure their safe operations
- Airport Transit System, a U.S. rail system at Chicago O'Hare International Airport, Illinois
- Automatic train stop, a system that stops a train in certain situations to prevent accidents
- Automatic train supervision, a module within communications-based train control (CBTC)

=== Vehicles ===
- Cadillac ATS, a car model produced by Cadillac
- Boeing Airpower Teaming System, an Australian unmanned aircraft which incorporates artificial intelligence and utilizes a modular mission package system
- Salvage and rescue ship (US Navy hull classification symbol: ATS), see List of auxiliaries of the United States Navy

== Other uses ==
- American Truck Simulator, a 2016 vehicle simulation video game developed by SCS Software
- "Against the spread", in betting
- Alberta Township System, a land surveying system used in Western Canada
- Ats (given name)

== See also ==
- IBM Administrative Terminal System (ATS/360)
