= Ati =

Ati or ATI may refer to:

- Ati people, a Negrito ethnic group in the Philippines
  - Ati language (Philippines), the language spoken by this people group
  - Ati-Atihan festival, an annual celebration held in the Philippines
- Ati language (China), an unclassified Loloish language of Huaning County, Yunnan, China
- Ati, a queen of the fabled Land of Punt in Africa
- Ati, Chad, a town in Chad
- Ati, Iran, a village in Khuzestan Province, Iran
- Maha Ati, one of the nine subdivisions of Buddhist Tantra in the Nyingma school

The acronym ATI may refer to:

== Academic institutions ==
- Auckland Technical Institute, now the Auckland University of Technology, Auckland, New Zealand
- Ohio State University Agricultural Technical Institute, known as Ohio State ATI
- An associate of the Tax Institute of Australia

== Electronics and information technology ==
- Acronis True Image, cloning and backup software
- Allied Telesis, a telecommunications company, formerly Allied Telesyn
- Tunisian Internet Agency, also known as ATI (short for Agence tunisienne d'Internet), telecommunications company in Tunisia

== Companies ==
- ATI Inc., an American specialty metals company headquartered in Dallas, Texas
- ATI Technologies, a former Canadian semiconductor company manufacturing GPUs and chipsets
- ATI Inc., an American speaker and civil defense sirens manufacturer.

== Transportation ==
- Aero Trasporti Italiani, a defunct Italian airline (ICAO designator)
- Air Transport International, a charter cargo airline
- Artigas Airport, IATA designation

== Other uses ==
- Above threshold ionization, a photoelectrochemical process ionizing an atom by an excessive number of photons
- Access to Insight, a Theravada Buddhist website
- Associated Television International, a production and distribution company
- Astatine monoiodide, a radioactive molecule
- Amylase/trypsin inhibitor, a substance that inhibits the enzymes amylase or trypsin (see Non-celiac gluten sensitivity)

== See also ==
- TI (disambiguation)
- AT (disambiguation)
- ATIS (disambiguation)
- at1 (disambiguation)
- atl (disambiguation)
