= Technology Square =

Technology Square or Tech Square may refer to one of two commercial developments in the United States:

- Technology Square (Atlanta), Georgia, a neighborhood adjacent to Georgia Tech
- Technology Square (Cambridge, Massachusetts), an office complex adjacent to MIT
