= AT1 =

AT1 may refer to:

- Angiotensin II receptor type 1
- Additional Tier 1 capital, see Contingent convertible bond
- Yamaha AT1 (1969-1971) motorcycle
- Ekspress AT1, communications satellite AT1 in the Ekspress network
- AeroTech Release 1; tabletop wargame

== See also ==
- Angiotensin II receptor blocker (AT1 blocker)
- ATL (disambiguation)
- ATI (disambiguation)
- AT (disambiguation)
