= Computer Corporation of America =

Developer of database systems

- Company type: Private
- Industry: Software
- Founded: 1965; 61 years ago in Cambridge, Massachusetts
- Defunct: 2010; 16 years ago
- Fate: Acquired by Rocket Software
- Products: Database systems

Computer Corporation of America (CCA) was a software house and database systems company founded in 1965 by Thomas Marill. It was best known for its Model 204 (M204) database system for IBM and compatible mainframes.

It was acquired by Rocket Software in 2010.

== Corporate history ==
Founded in 1965, Computer Corporation of America (CCA) was a computer software and database systems. with offices in Technology Square, Kendall Square, Cambridge, Massachusetts.

Their primary database product, first deployed in 1972, was Model 204 (M204), which ran on IBM mainframes. It incorporates a programming language and an environment for application development.

CCA operated the ARPANET Datacomputer.

In 1992, CCA purchased the System 1022 and System 1032 assets of Software House; these database systems were designed for Digital Equipment Corporation's PDP-10 and VAX systems, respectively.

In 1984, CCA was purchased by Crowntek, a Toronto-based company. Crowntek sold Computer Corporation of America's Advanced Information Technology division to Xerox Corporation in 1988.

The balance of CCA was acquired by Rocket Software, a Boston-based developer of enterprise infrastructure products, in April 2010.

=== CCA EMACS ===
Early ads for CCA EMACS (Computer Corporation of America) (Steve Zimmerman) appeared in 1984. CCA EMACS was originally based on Warren Montgomery's EMACS, but was gradually rewritten so that by the time of its commercial release in 1983, none of Montgomery's code was present anymore. CCA EMACS was written to emulate the original PDP-10 EMACS (written by Richard Stallman) as closely as possible, while adding many new commands as well. In 1984, in a competition with other versions of Emacs, it won a site license from MIT for their Project Athena.
