= Lisa Curran =

American tropical forester

- Education: Harvard University; Princeton University
- Awards: MacArthur Fellows Program
- Scientific career
- Fields: Environment & Anthropology
- Workplaces: Yale University; Stanford University; Santa Fe Institute

Lisa Curran was an American tropical forester, and Roger and Cynthia Lang Professor in Environment & Anthropology, at Stanford University.

== Education ==
Curran graduated from Harvard University, and Princeton University with a Ph.D.

== Career ==
Curran was professor of tropical ecology and director of the Tropical Resources Institute at the Yale University.

Curran was a professor at the Santa Fe Institute.

== Awards ==
- 2006 MacArthur Fellows Program

== Works ==
- Carlson, K.* and L. M. Curran, 2009. "REDD pilot project scenarios: Are costs and benefits altered by spatial scale?", Environmental Research Letters.
- Ponette-Gonzalez, A. G., K. C. Weathers and L. M. Curran, 2010. "Water inputs across a tropical montane landscape in Veracruz, Mexico: synergistic effects of land cover, rain and fog seasonality, and interannual precipitation variability", Global Change Biology, 16 (3): 946–963. doi:10.1111/j.1365-2486.2009.01985.x
- Balch, J.K.,* D. C. Nepstad, and L. M. Curran, 2009. "Pattern and process: Fire-initiated grass invasion at Amazon transitional forest edges". In: Fire Ecology of Tropical Ecosystems, Ed M. Cochrane.
- Balch, J.K.,* D. C. Nepstad, P. M. Brando, L. M. Curran, O. Portela, O. de Carvalho Jr., and P. Lefebvre, 2008. "Negative fire feedback in a transitional forest of southern Amazonia". Global Change Biology 14: 2276-2287.
- Cannon, C. H.,* L. M. Curran, A. J. Marshall, and M. Leighton, 2007. "Long-term reproductive behavior of woody plants across seven Bornean forest types in the Gunung Palung National Park (Indonesia): supra-annual synchrony, temporal productivity and fruiting diversity". Ecology Letters 10:956-969.
- Paoli, G. D.,* and L. M. Curran, 2007. "Soil nutrients limit aboveground productivity in mature lowland tropical forests of Southwestern Borneo". Ecosystems 10:503-518.
- Gullison, R.E, P. Frumhoff, J. Canadell, C. B. Field, D.C. Nepstad, K. Hayhoe, R. Avissar, L.M. Curran, P. Friedlingsten, C.D. Jones and C. Nobre. 2007. "Tropical forests and climate policy". Science 316:985-986.
- Curran, L.M. and S. D. Trigg. 2006. "Sustainability science from space: Quantifying forest disturbance and land use in the Amazon". Proc. of Nat. Acad. Sci. 103:12663-12664.
- Soares-Filho, Britaldo Silveira, D. C. Nepstad, L. M. Curran et al., 2006. "Modelling conservation in the Amazon basin". Nature 440:520-523.
- Santilli, M., P. M. Moutino, S. Schwartzman, D. C. Nepstad, L. M. Curran, and C. Nobre. 2005. "Tropical deforestation and the Kyoto Protocol". Climatic Change 71:267-276.
- Soares-Filho, Britaldo Silveira, Nepstad, Daniel Curtis, Curran, Lisa et al. 2005. "Cenários de desmatamento para a Amazônia". Estudos Avançados 19:137-152.
- Curran, L. M., S. Trigg, A. McDonald, D. Astiani, Y. M. Hardiono, P. Siregar, I. Caniago, and E. Kasischke. 2004. "Lowland forest loss in protected areas of Indonesian Borneo". Science 303:1000-1003. SOM
- Barber, C. V., E. Mathews, D. Brown, T. H. Brown, L. M. Curran, C. Plume, and E. Selig. 2002. "The State of the Forest: Indonesia". Forest Watch International/ Global Forest Watch/World Resources Institute. 119 pp. Also published in Bahasa Indonesia, Keadaan Hutan Indonesia 131 pp.
- Curran, L. M., I. Caniago, G. D. Paoli,* D. Astiani,* M. Kusneti, M. Leighton, C. E. Nirarita, and H. Haeruman. 1999. "Impact of El Niño and logging on canopy tree recruitment in Borneo". Science 286:2184-2188.
