= Datacomputer =

Database utility on the ARPANET

The Datacomputer was an ARPANET-connected database system supported by the Computer Corporation of America in Cambridge, Massachusetts. It was intended as a computing utility sharing resources among multiple ARPA projects, in particular in seismology and climatology. It operated from August 1973 until 1980.

It was hosted on a DEC PDP-10 running the TENEX operating system (ARPANET host CCA-TENEX, address 31) and was designed to support 3 trillion bits of storage (375 GB). Besides storage, the Datacomputer also offered data conversion utilities which supported the multiple data formats used at the time.

The largest user of the Datacomputer was ARPA's Seismic Data Analysis Center (SDAC) (Alexandria, Virginia), which monitored underground nuclear tests.

The Datacomputer manipulated data using a custom Datalanguage. A sample retrieval request:

OPEN RESULTLIST ;
OPEN WEATHER ;

FOR WEATHER.STATION WITH REGION EQ 'MASSACHUSETTS'
FOR RESULTLIST.RESULT, OBSERVATION WITH TEMPERATURE.MAX GT '300' /* DEGREES KELVIN */
RESULT.CITY = STATION.CITY ;
RESULT.DATE = OBSERVATION.DATE ;
RESULT.TEMPERATURE = OBSERVATION.TEMPERATURE ;
END ;
END;

The Datacomputer hardware had a three-level store: primary core, secondary hard disk, and tertiary mass storage. At the time, disk cost about $20/megabit, while mass stores, typically robotic magnetic tape systems, cost about $1/megabit. The service started in 1973 with disk storage only; tertiary storage using Ampex's Terabit Memory System (TMS) hardware, based on videotape technology, was to come on line in 1975. In 1979, TMS's capacity was 175 billion bits (22 GB), and the total data stored was over 500 billion bits (62 GB)
