= Britaldo Silveira Soares Filho =

Brazilian environmental scientist

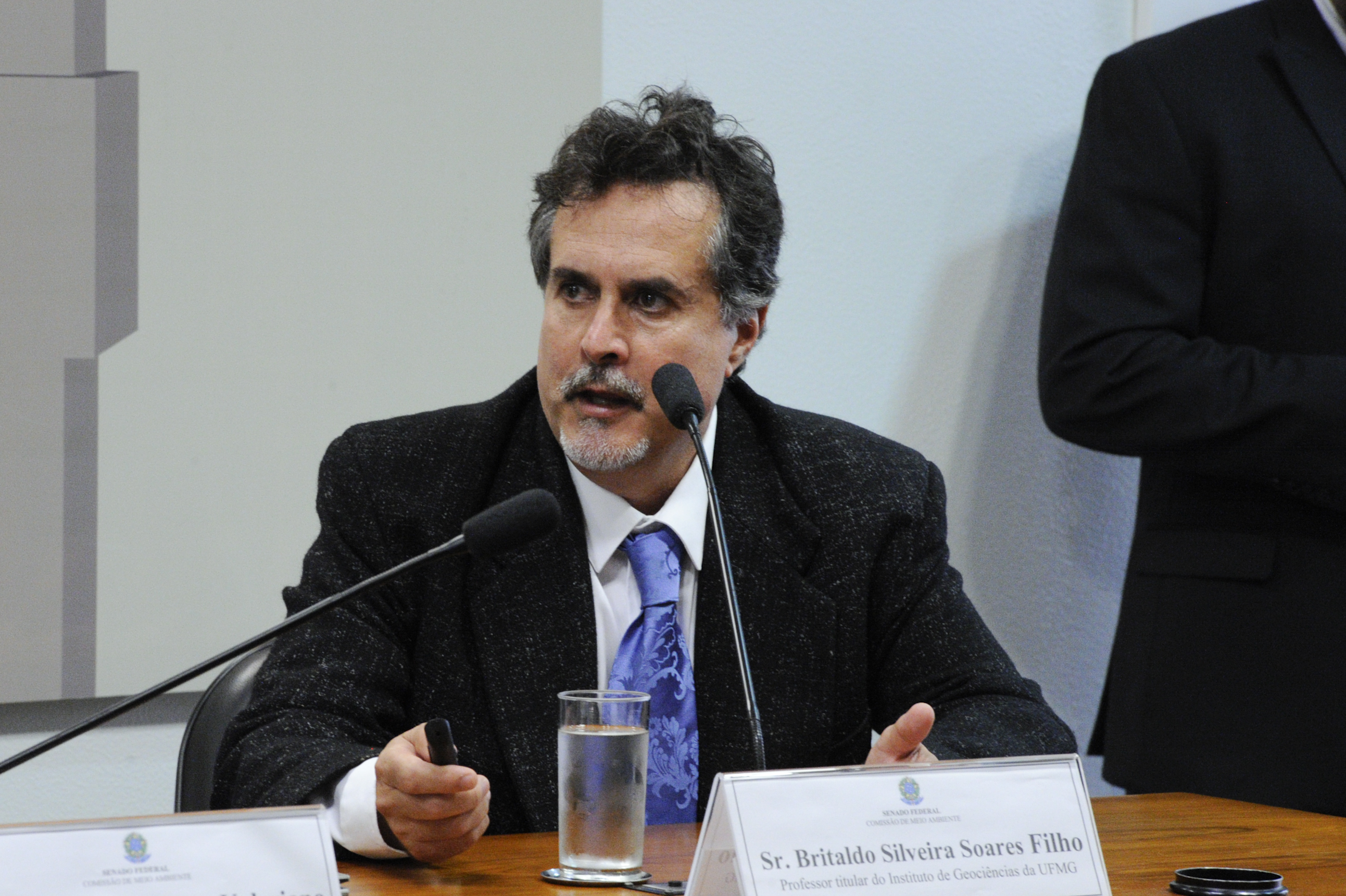
- Education: Universidade Federal de Minas Gerais; Instituto Nacional de Pesquisas Espaciais; Universidade de São Paulo
- Scientific career
- Fields: Environmental Modeling
- Workplaces: Instituto de Geociências da Universidade Federal de Minas Gerais

Britaldo Silveira Soares Filho is a Brazilian scientist, and professor of Environment Modeling at the Federal University of Minas Gerais. He won the Georg Foster Research Awards for developing ''innovative methods in the field of geography and cartography which make it possible to precisely predict how tropical rainforests – such as in the Amazon basin – will develop. Based on these models, the government of Brazil has implemented a variety of protective measures and is planning more for the future."

== Education ==
- BA in Geology, Universidade Federal de Minas Gerais: March, 1978-December, 1982.
- MSc in Remote Sensing, Instituto Nacional de Pesquisas Espaciais – March 1987-November 1989.
- DSc in Spatial Analyses, Universidade de São Paulo – March, 1993-September, 1998.

== Career ==
Dr. Britaldo Silveira Soares-Filho is full professor of Department of Cartography since March 2012, Institute of Geosciences and the current coordinator of CSR (Remote Sensing Center) of Federal University of Minas Gerais (Universidade Federal de Minas Gerais), Brazil. He advises at the graduate courses on Production Engineering and Environmental Modeling of UFMG; of which he led the creation of the latter. Since 2000, he has collaborated in various research projects in the Amazon with IPAM (Instituto de Pesquisa Ambiental da Amazônia), Aliança da Terra, and the Woods Hole Research Center, where he is a distinguished visiting scientist. In addition, he is member of the scientific board of CTI (Center of Territorial Intelligence) and guest professor at Center for Development Research University of Bonn, Germany.

His research consists of environmental modeling, in particular, the development of simulation models of changes in land use and coverage, agricultural and forest profitability, urban dynamics, forest fire and carbon balance and their applications for the design of public policies and evaluation policies. An important product of his research is the DINAMICA EGO software, a platform for environmental modeling used by researchers from various countries like Mexico, Iran, Bangladesh, Greece, China and others.

Soares Filho participated in important projects to define public policies for environmental protection and conservation in Brazil, such as the Amazon Region Protected Areas Program, in which he is part of the Arpa Scientific Advisory Panel, and the environmental impact modeling studies of the implementation of BR 163 in the Amazon region

== Awards ==
- 2007. IPCC fourth report, working group III, mitigation, contributing author, chapter 9, Forestry – IPCC was awarded jointly with Al Gore with the 2007 Nobel Peace Prize.
- 2015. Georg Forster Research Award, The Alexander von Humboldt Foundation
