= Michael D. Reynolds =

American astronomer

Michael D. Reynolds FRAS
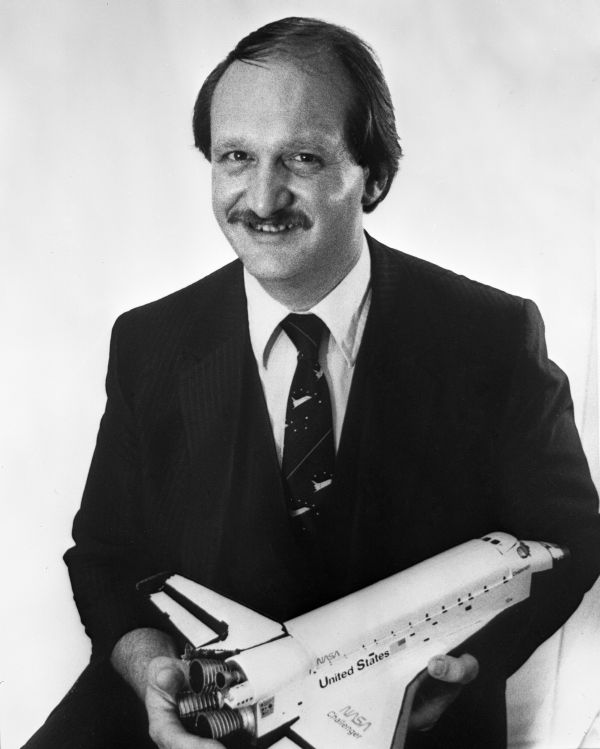
- Reynolds, c. 1986
- Born: March 30, 1954; Florida, United States
- Died: October 15, 2019 (aged 65); Jacksonville, Florida, U.S.
- Other names: Mike Reynolds; Mike D. Reynolds
- Education: Florida Junior College (AA); Thomas Edison State University (BA); University of North Florida (MED); University of Florida (PhD)
- Awards: Fellow of the Royal Astronomical Society (2004)
- Scientific career
- Fields: Astronomy; Education
- Institutions: Florida State College at Jacksonville; Chabot Space and Science Center; University of North Florida
- Thesis: Two-Dimensional Versus Three-Dimensional Conceptualization in Astronomy Education (1990)

Michael David Reynolds FRAS (March 30, 1954 – October 15, 2019) was an American author and educator who served as professor of astronomy at Florida State College at Jacksonville in Jacksonville, Florida. He served as the director of Chabot Space and Science Center in Alameda County, California. Reynolds was best known for his work in science education, both in lecture halls and less formal settings. He also participated in astronomy and space exploration outreach.

== Early life and education ==
Reynolds grew up in Jacksonville, Florida, where he studied at Duncan U. Fletcher High School. While in elementary school, Reynolds saw the first American crewed suborbital launch, Freedom 7, on television. This reportedly partially inspired his love of space.

He later studied at Thomas Edison State College in Trenton, New Jersey where, in 1980, he received a bachelor's degree in natural sciences. In 1982, he received a Master of Education in science from the University of North Florida. Reynolds submitted his thesis, Two–Dimensional versus Three–Dimensional Conceptualization in Astronomy, to the University of Florida in Gainesville, Florida and received a Doctorate of Philosophy in science education and astronomy in 1990.

== Career ==
Reynolds started his career in 1981 as a teacher at Duncan U. Fletcher High School, where he taught physics and chemistry. For his work at Fletcher, he was honored as the 1986 Florida Teacher of the Year.

In 1985, Reynolds was one of the leading candidates for NASA's Teacher in Space Project, a program started by President Ronald Reagan in which civilian teachers would be sent into orbit aboard a Space Shuttle. The following year, he travelled to the Kennedy Space Center in Cape Canaveral, Florida to watch teacher Christa McAuliffe and six other crew members of mission STS-51-L be killed in what was later called the Space Shuttle Challenger disaster. He later left his position at Fletcher High and took up an outreach position as the Christa McAuliffe Ambassador for Education, a position created after the disaster by the Florida Department of Education and NASA.

Reynolds later worked as a planetarium director at the Museum of Science and History (MOSH).

Reynolds' astronomical research was primarily focused on Solar System objects, as well as meteoritics. He led expeditions around the world for numerous total solar eclipses, meteorite crater research, and meteorite recoveries. He worked with Meade Instruments in 2005 to develop, curate, and create Meade's MeteoriteKit, a special set of meteorites, tektites, and impactites.

Reynolds served as president of the Antique Telescope Society. He served on the board of directors of the Association of Lunar and Planetary Observers (ALPO). Reynolds helped create the Astronomical League’s Outreach Award Program in 2001, and served as the national coordinator of that program until 2015, when Dr. W. Maynard Pittendreigh became the coordinator. Reynolds also served as chair or co-chair for several conferences, including the highly successful AstroCon 2004 held in Berkeley, California.

He was a member of the American Astronomical Society, and a fellow of the Royal Astronomical Society. Reynolds served on three national non-profit boards: Astronomy Outreach Foundation, the National Sharing the Skies Foundation, and the W Foundation (for Space Exploration education). He also served on the Meade 4M Community Board of Advisors.

Reynolds was the Executive Director Emeritus of the Chabot Space and Science Center in Oakland, California. He served as the Science Center's Executive Director and CEO from 1991 to 2002, where he led the effort to design, fundraise for, and overview construction of a new, 88,000-square-foot (8,200 m^{2}) astronomy and space-oriented science center which opened in 2000 to replace the 1915-era facility. He served as an appraiser for numerous collections due to his expertise in rare and collectible astronomical and space artifacts.

Reynolds wrote several astronomy books, including Binocular Stargazing (2003), Falling Stars (2000), and Observe Eclipses (1995). He also co-authored two college-level astronomy lab texts, Basic Astronomy Labs (1996) and A Laboratory Guide for Astronomy (2015) with Michael Bakich. He wrote and served as a corresponding editor for Astronomy magazine. In addition to leading expeditions worldwide, Reynolds served as a much sought-after speaker, engaging audiences in all things astronomical.

== Death ==
Mike Reynolds died of cardiac arrest in his home on the afternoon of October 15, 2019 at the age of 65.

== Awards and honors ==
- Asteroid 298877 Michaelreynolds, discovered by astronomers at the Jarnac Observatory in Arizona in 2004, was named in his honor. The name was suggested by David H. Levy and Matthew D'Auria, and the official naming citation was published by the Minor Planet Center on August 31, 2012 (MPC 80329).
- Fellow of the Royal Astronomical Society, elected 2004
- NASA Teacher in Space Project finalist, 1985
- Florida Teacher of the Year, 1986
- G. Bruce Blair Medal recipient, 2002
- Recipient of the Astronomical League's Peltier Award, 2002.
