= Keydata Corporation =

- Industry: Time-sharing
- Founded: 1959; 66 years ago in Cambridge, Massachusetts, United States
- Founder: Charles W. Adams
- Defunct: 1981

Keydata Corporation was one of the first companies in the time-sharing business in the 1960s. It was the brainchild of Charles W. Adams, an entrepreneur who had founded "Adams Associates" who were best remembered as the authors of computer equipment surveys during this period.

Keydata was located in Technology Square in Cambridge, Massachusetts (later moved to Watertown, Massachusetts), where Project MAC, the seminal venture sponsored by MIT which saw the development of MULTICS one of the earliest time sharing software systems. UNIX is a derivative of MULTICS. In addition, IBM's Cambridge Scientific Center was located in Technology Square and this R&D center developed the first IBM virtual memory system computer, CP/CMS. This was initially installed on a modified IBM System/360 Model 40 computer with the informal name of the "Cambridge box." Later IBM used modernized technology for the 360/67 and, today, all modern computers use "virtual memory."

The coincident location of the nexus of time sharing and virtual memory developers in Cambridge resulted in a heady climate of information technology state-of-the-art knowledge sharing which Keydata profited by, although its UNIVAC computer architecture permitted only software-based implementations. At the time, the fashion was the idea that computer power would be made available on a network connection of a "dumb" terminal to a "smart" mainframe computer utility, sharing mammoth computer power with thousands, if not millions, of users.

Keydata used a UNIVAC 490 computer using drum (secondary) memory to provide commercial applications such as inventory management and accounting applications on a network basis to slow Teletype-based terminals in customer locations and replaced in-house computers and other services with its highly customized parameter-driven distribution and manufacturing applications. The online transaction management application was monolithic, written in a proprietary high-level language; it consisted of hundreds of thousands of lines of code. The application was highly parametrized such that it could be customized to each customer's requirements just by tweaking the parameters. New parameters were introduced as needed. Networking to customers consisted of private, point to point connections through AT&T.

Other seminal services were initially implemented on this service, such as Instinet, a stock trading service now owned by Reuters which trades large block transactions on US securities markets, and a very early network inventory network application for Shell Oil company.

At its peak, Keydata had hundreds of customers on-line. As minicomputers arrived in the market, Keydata tried to adapt their applications to the DEC's VAX 780 and the Hewlett-Packard 3000 series, but this proved impossible due to the complexity of the project and the lack of resources.
