= ATLS =

ATLS or AtLS may refer to:

- Advanced trauma life support
- Alliance to Liberate Scotland, a political party in Scotland
- Automated truck loading systems
