= Chabot Space and Science Center =

Science center in California

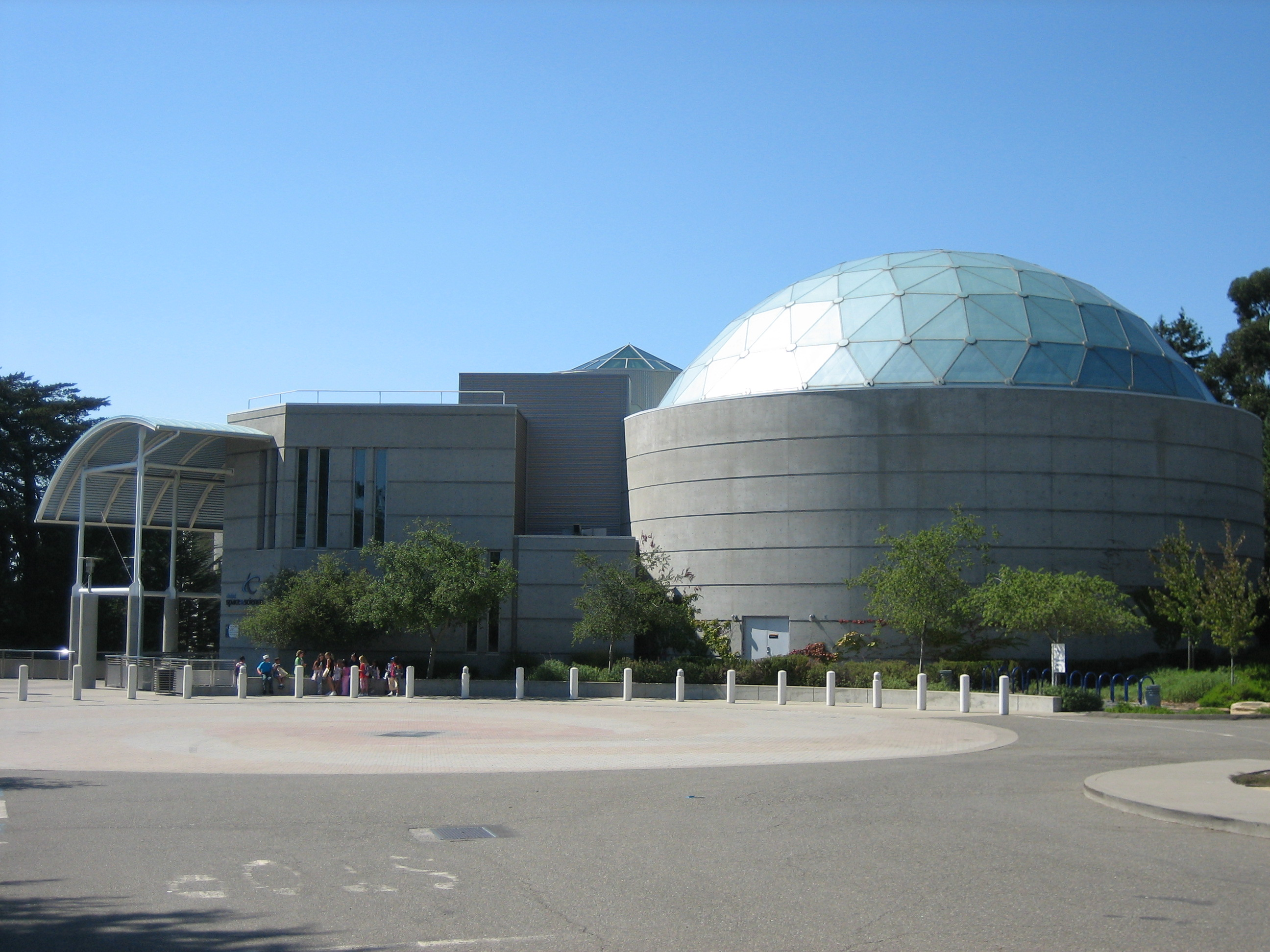
- View of the entrance of the Chabot Space and Science Center

- Location within Oakland, California Location within California Location within the United States
- Established: 1883
- Location: Oakland, California, United States
- Coordinates: 37°49′07″N 122°10′50″W
- Type: Planetarium
- Website: chabotspace.org

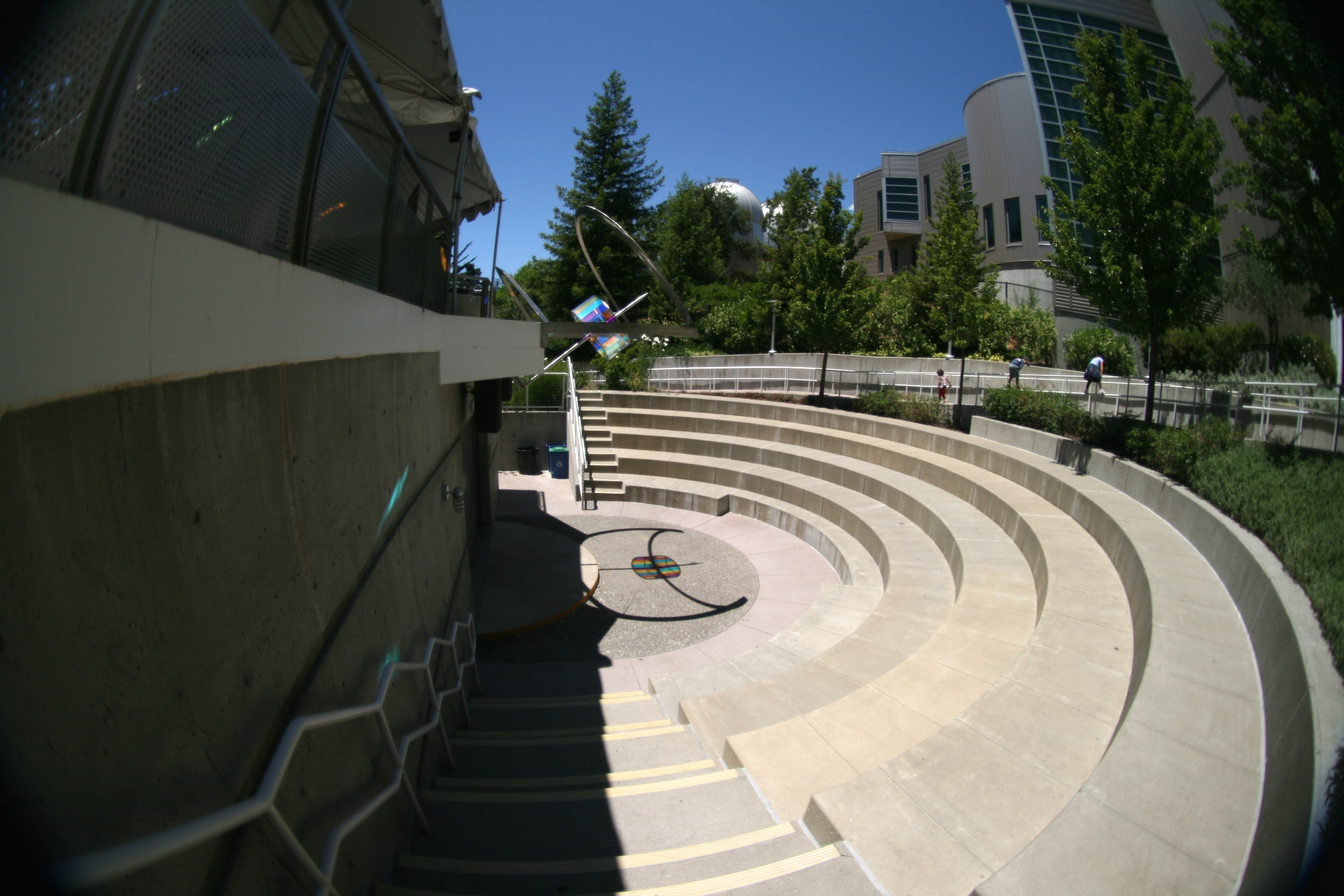
Solar clock at the Chabot Space and Science Center

Chabot Space and Science Center (/ʃəˈboʊ/), located in Oakland, California, is a center for learning in Earth and space science, which features interactive exhibits, planetariums, a large screen theater, hands-on activities, and three powerful telescopes.

The center is the continuation and expansion of a public observatory that has served San Francisco Bay Area schools and citizens with astronomy and science education programs since 1883. It is named after the father of hydraulic mining and benefactor of the original Oakland Observatory, Anthony Chabot. Since 2000, the center has been located on the western border of Redwoods Regional Park and has partnered with the National Aeronautics and Space Administration, hosting the NASA Ames Visitor Center.

== History ==
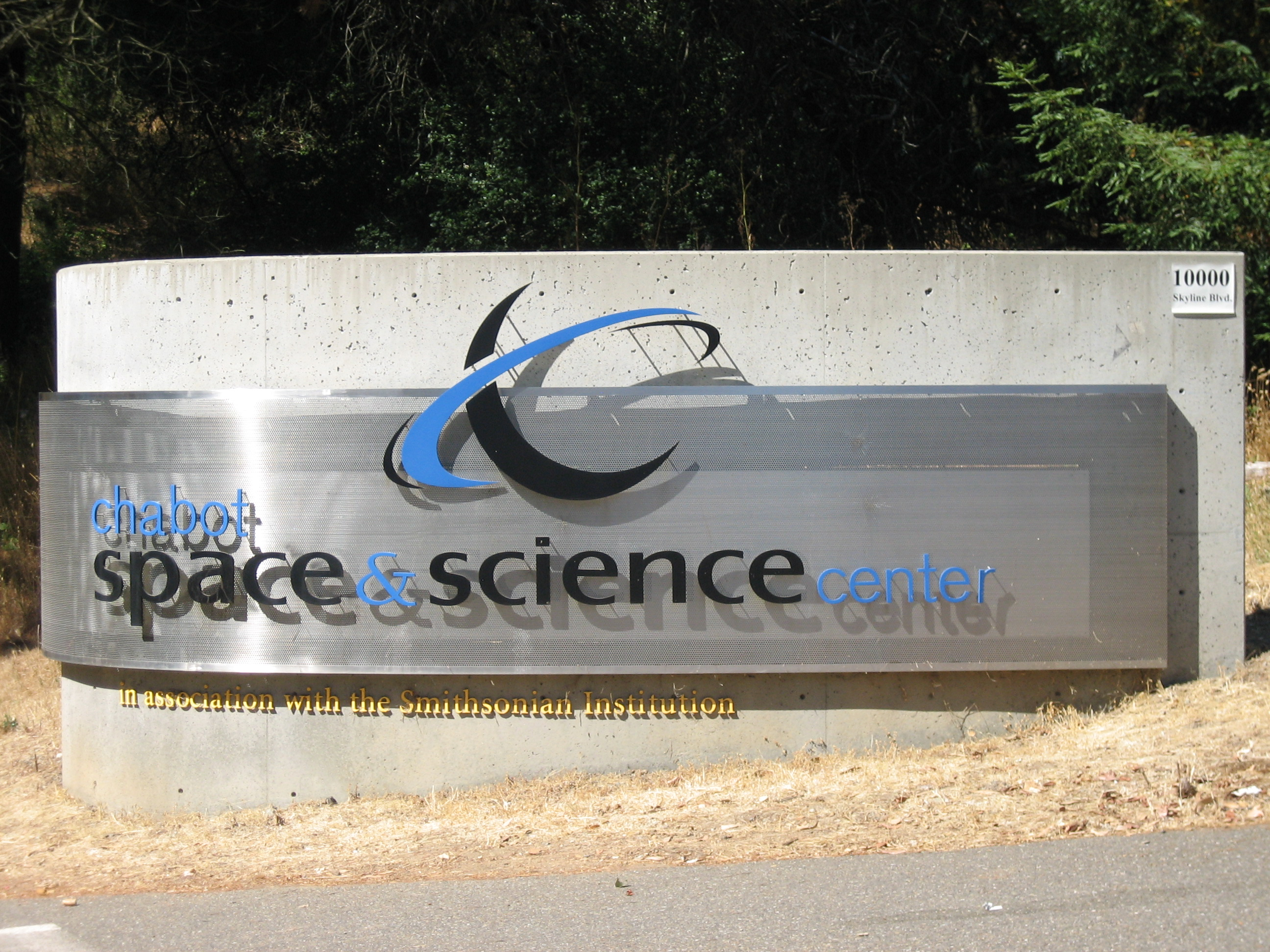
The sign at the entrance of the Chabot Space and Science Center

The institution began in 1883 as the Oakland Observatory, through a gift from Anthony Chabot to the City of Oakland. The original Oakland Observatory was located near downtown Oakland and provided public telescope viewing for the community. For decades, it also served as the official timekeeping station for the entire Bay Area, measuring time with its transit telescope.

The observatory moved to its Mountain Boulevard location near the current State Route 13 (37°47′13″N 122°10′42″W - telescope domes visible in satellite view) in 1915 due to increasing light pollution and urban congestion. In the mid-1960s, the facility was expanded considerably. Throughout this time, Chabot Science Center, as it was renamed, was staffed mainly by Oakland Unified School District personnel and volunteers. In 1977, seismic safety concerns terminated public school students’ access to the original observatory facility. The observatory building remained open to the general public, but school activities were limited to outlying classroom buildings and the planetarium.

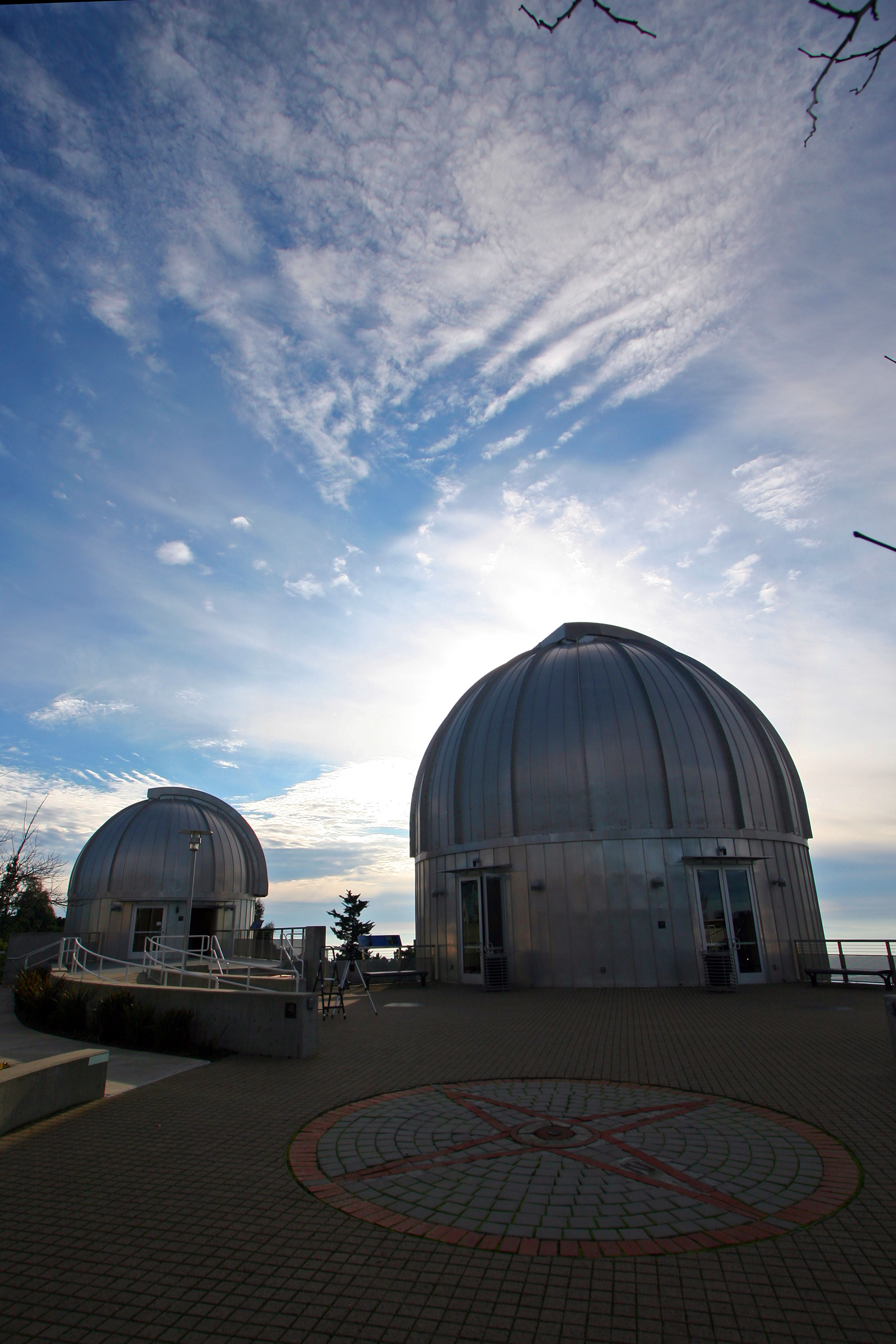
Wightman Observatory Plaza at the current location

Recognizing the need to restore full access to the facility, either by repair or relocation, in 1989 Chabot Observatory & Science Center was formed as a joint powers agency with the City of Oakland, the Oakland Unified School District, and the East Bay Regional Park District, in collaboration with the Eastbay Astronomical Society, and in 1992 was recognized as a nonprofit organization. The project was led by Chabot's Executive Director and CEO, Dr. Michael D. Reynolds, breaking ground for the facility in October 1996 with construction of the new 88,000-square-foot (8,200 m^{2}) Science Center beginning in May 1998.

In January 2000, anticipating the opening of the new facility, the organization changed its name from Chabot Observatory & Science Center to Chabot Space & Science Center. The new name was chosen to better convey the organization's focus on astronomy and the space sciences, while communicating both the broad range and the technologically advanced nature of programs available in the new Science Center.

Opened August 19, 2000, the Chabot Space & Science Center is an 86,000-square-foot (8,000 m^{2}), state-of-the-art science and technology education facility on a 13-acre (53,000 m^{2}) site in the hills of Oakland, California. The museum was formerly an affiliate in the Smithsonian Affiliations program but is currently no longer an affiliate.

== Attractions ==
Aside from its telescopes, it contains:

- A "full dome digital projection system" with various shows running daily, and a Zeiss Universarium fiber-optic projector with weekly shows.
- NASA Ames Visitor Center, a hands-on exhibition that brings to life the thrilling, challenging and inspiring process of scientific discovery by showcasing the real stories and people at NASA’s Ames Research Center.
- The Theater, a 70-foot (21 m) dome screen auditorium which presented various IMAX-like shows. (now no longer in regular use).
- Many changing exhibits, full of hands-on displays, that highlight space and science topics.

== Telescopes ==
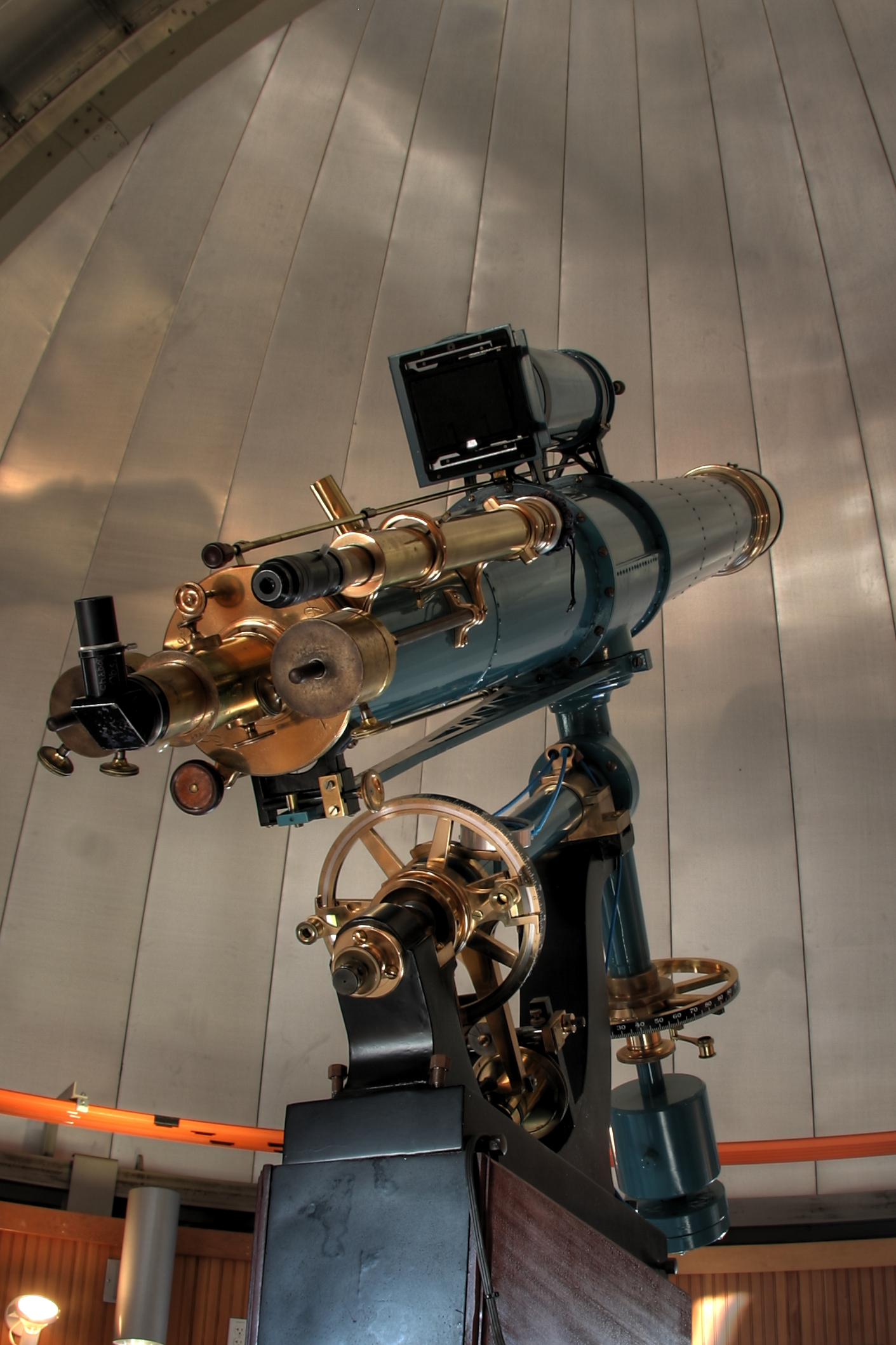
Chabot's 8-inch (200 mm) refractor telescope, Leah

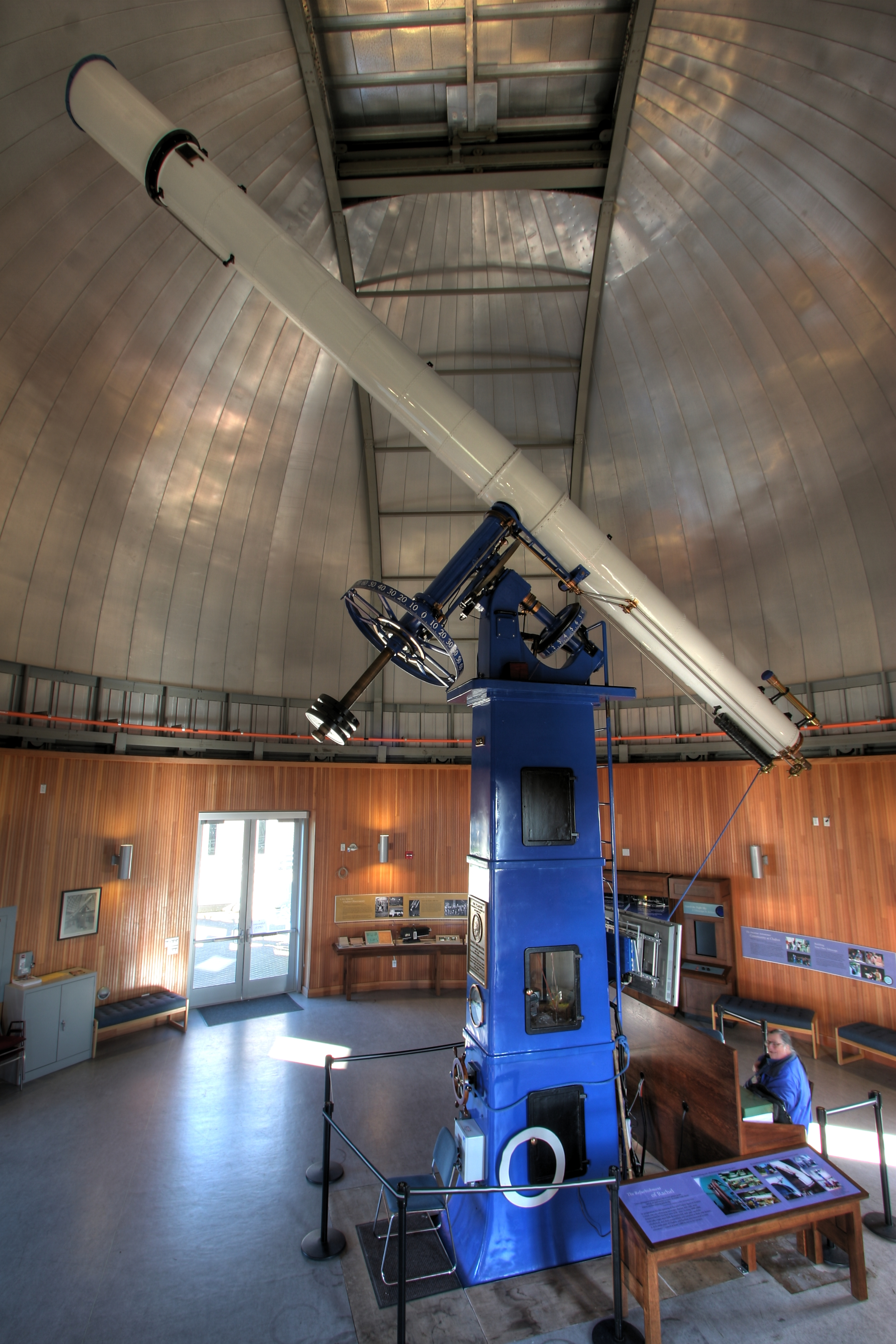
Chabot's 20-inch (510 mm) refractor telescope, Rachel

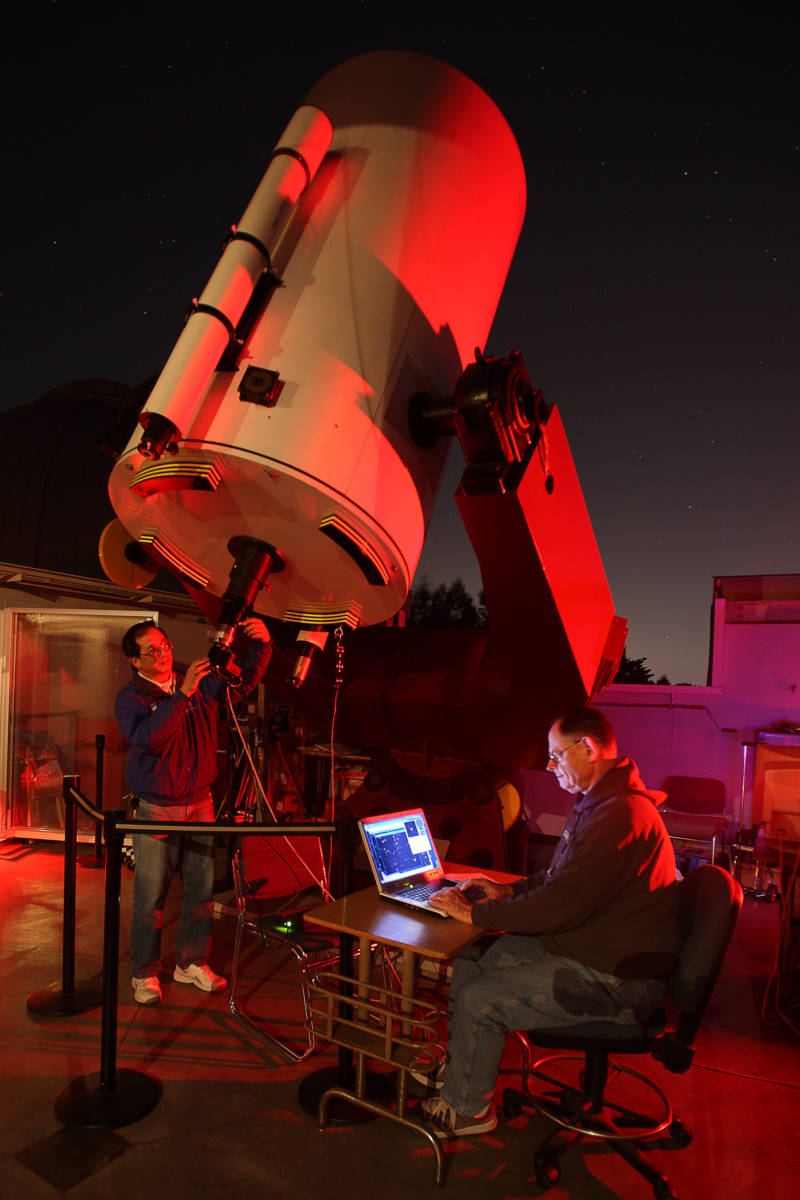
Chabot's 36-inch (910 mm) Cassegrain telescope, Nellie

Chabot Space and Science Center has three observatory telescopes, all of which are open to the public on weekends.

- "Leah" is an 8" refractor telescope built in 1883 by Alvan Clark & Sons and donated by Anthony Chabot.
- "Rachel" is a 20" refractor telescope (28 ft focal length), commissioned in 1914 from Warner & Swasey, with optics by John Brashear. It is the largest refractor in the western United States regularly open to the public.
- "Nellie" is a 36" Cassegrain reflector telescope which opened in August 2003, housed in a rolling roof observatory. The primary mirror was donated by Lawrence Livermore National Laboratory and figured and polished by Rayleigh Optical Corporation. Control systems and mount drives were purchased from DFM Engineering.

== Observatory quick facts ==
- Original Observatory built: 1883, near Downtown Oakland, California
- Second Observatory built: 1915, at Mountain Boulevard
- Third (Present) Observatory built: 2000, at Skyline Boulevard

== Telescope Details ==
Leah

- Type - Refracting telescope
- Maker - Alvan Clark & Sons, 1883
- Aperture – 8 inches
- Focal Length – 112 inches
- Mount – German equatorial
- Benefactor: Anthony Chabot
- Usage Intent – popular and educational use

Meridian Transit Telescope

- Type - Transit telescope
- Maker - Fauth & Co., 1885
- Aperture – 4 inches
- Focal Length –
- Mount – Double Pier Transit
- Usage Intent – popular and educational use / time determination

Rachel

- Type - Refracting telescope
- Maker - Warner & Swasey / John Brashear, 1914
- Aperture – 20 inches
- Focal Length – 28 feet (8.5 m)
- Mount – German equatorial
- Cost – $20,000
- Usage Intent – popular and educational use, formerly used for spacecraft tracking

Nellie

- Type - Reflecting telescope, specifically a classical cassegrain reflector
- Maker - Chabot Space & Science Center, 2003
- Aperture – 36 inches
- Focal Length – 24 feet (7.3 m)
- Mount – equatorial fork
- Usage Intent – popular and educational use, research including tracking of Near Earth Objects.

== Planetariums ==
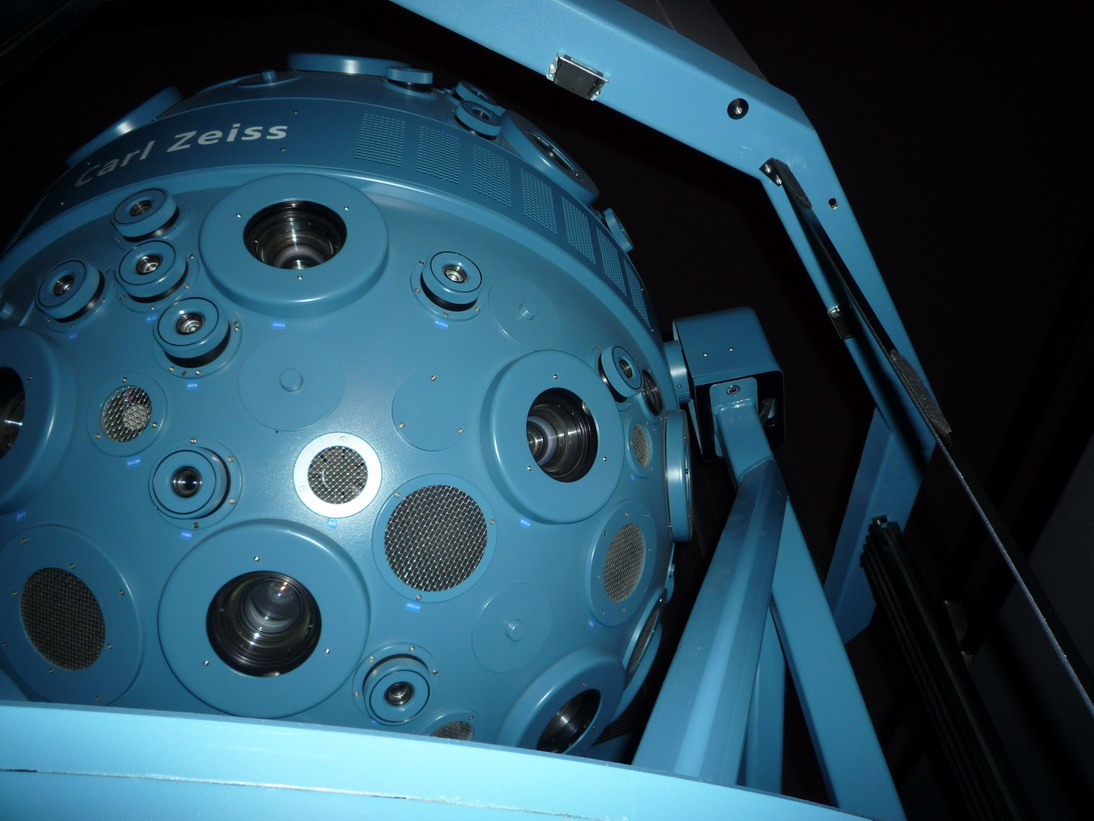
Chabot's Zeiss Universarium planetarium projector

Chabot's Fulldome Planetarium

The Planetarium seats 250 people under a 70-foot (21 m) diameter dome and features live weekly shows presented by a staff astronomer, also daily pre-recorded "fulldome" shows.

- Zeiss Universarium:

The custom-built Zeiss Universarium Mark VIII fiber-optic star projector was recently refurbished. World-class optics create a precise, deep-field sky with up to 9,000 celestial objects.

- Live Show:

Cosmos 360 uses the planetarium's digital system to view the night sky. The guided tour includes in-depth views of planets, constellations and other current astronomical events. The show is updated to reflect seasonal night skies.

A complete schedule and listing of daily shows as well as current show times can be found at the center's planetarium page.

== Galaxy Explorers program ==
The Chabot Space and Science Center offers volunteer and educational opportunities to local teens, who work as explainers on the museum floor or on outreach trips. The program was initiated by a grant from YouthALIVE! (Youth Achievement through Learning Involvement, Volunteer and Employment!) through the Association of Science-Technology Centers.

== See also ==
- List of observatories
- List of largest optical refracting telescopes
