= Technology Square (Cambridge, Massachusetts) =

Office building complex in Cambridge, Massachusetts

Coordinates: 42.3635°N 71.0926°W

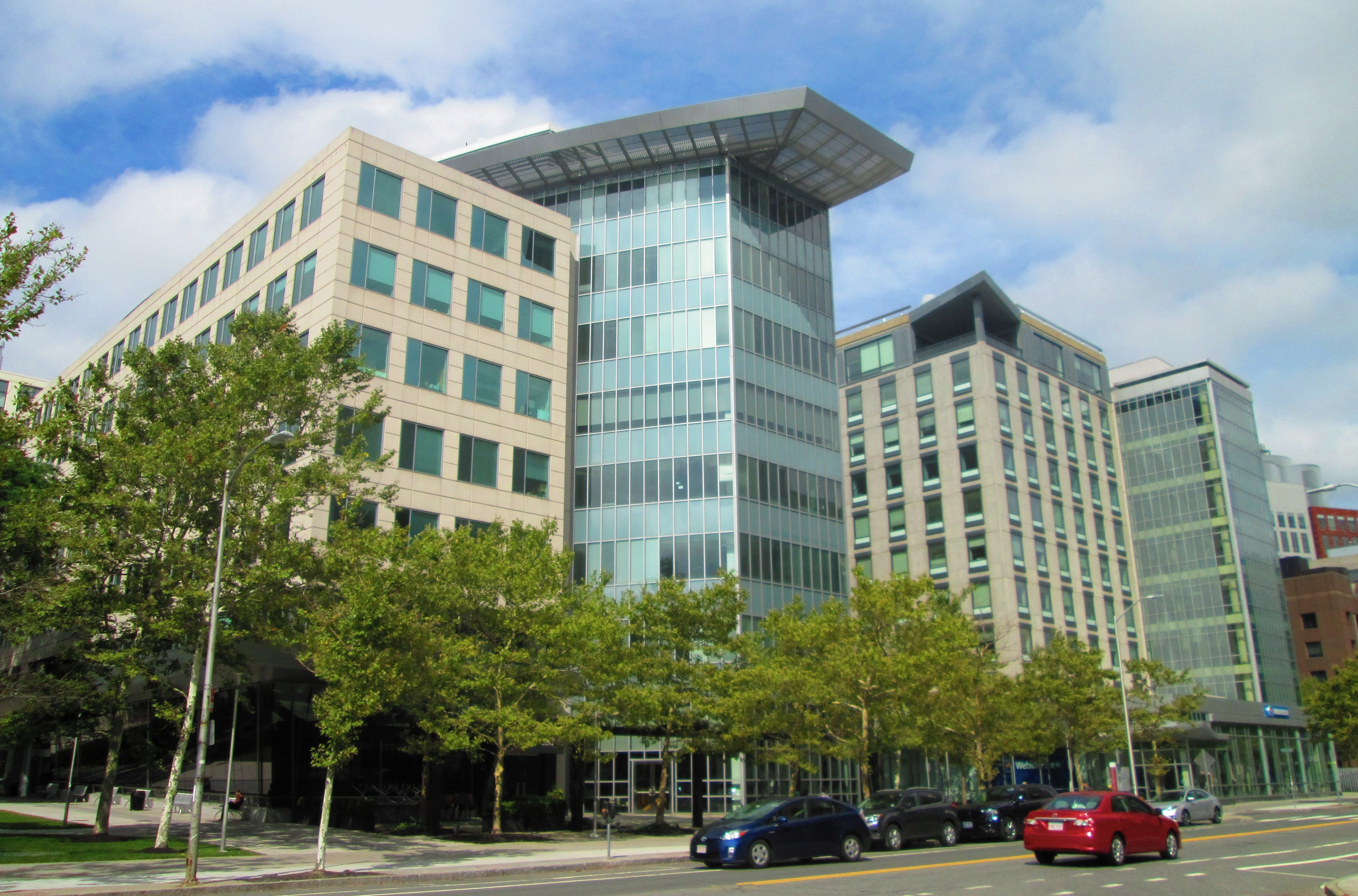
100, 300, and 500 Technology Square, as seen from Main Street in Cambridge

Technology Square, nicknamed Tech Square, is a commercial office building complex in the Port neighborhood of Cambridge, Massachusetts, immediately adjacent to the campus of the Massachusetts Institute of Technology (MIT).

== History ==
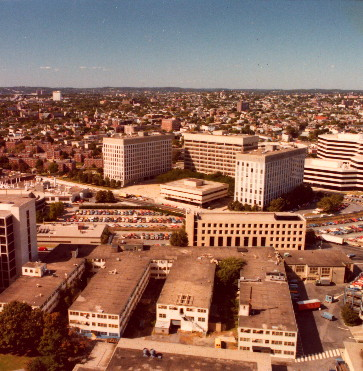
Historic photo shows three 9-story buildings surrounding low-rise 549 Technology Square (at center), with Draper Lab visible (at right edge of picture)

Tech Square was jointly developed by Cabot, Cabot & Forbes (CCF) and MIT on a 14-acre (5.7 ha) site which had previously housed a tenement (demolished in 1957) and a Lever Brothers soap factory (closed in 1959). The architects were Eduardo Catalano and Pietro Belluschi. The original architectural style was Brutalist (especially the central building), with a large open plaza paved with concrete and featuring wide shallow stepped levels.

The first building (545) opened in 1963, the second (575) in 1964. Two more buildings were erected in 1966 and 1967, forming a U facing Main Street made up of three nine-story buildings, and a three-story building in the middle.

In the 1970s, Draper Laboratory was built north of the original buildings, in the lot between them and Broadway, and was numbered 555.

Polaroid had its corporate headquarters at 549 Tech Square, the three-story building (known as the 'Block House') in the center of the courtyard, from 1966–1998. Between 1999 and 2002, the small building was demolished and an additional four buildings were added as infill to the former open plaza. All the older buildings were reworked into a more-contemporary style, and the combined complex was renumbered as 100–700. The comprehensive renovation and expansion was designed by Perkins & Will.

The original complex had no street-level storefronts, though it did house a small branch bank. The newer buildings add multiple storefronts with restaurants and retail properties aligned along the edge of the public sidewalk, rather than set back from the property lines as in its original conception.

MIT sold its interest in Tech Square in 1973–74 to CCF. CCF later went into bankruptcy, and the complex was successively owned by Mitsubishi Bank, the Prudential Life Insurance Company, and Beacon Capital Partners, until it was repurchased by MIT in 2001. Alexandria Real Estate Equities bought the complex for $600 million in 2006, and it is now officially called Alexandria Technology Square on some documentation, although the original name is still used almost exclusively.

== Occupants ==
MIT's Project MAC (1963–2004) and Artificial Intelligence Laboratory (1970–2004) occupied adjacent spaces at 545 Technology Square prior to their merger; the MIT building number assigned was NE43. Originally, the MIT labs occupied the 8th and 9th floors, but eventually they expanded to occupy the entire building. In 2004, the labs vacated Tech Square to move into their new expanded facilities in the MIT Stata Center on the main campus. The vacated building was completely overhauled and redesignated as 200 Technology Square.

Many other companies and organizations have had offices in Tech Square, including Polaroid, IBM's Cambridge Scientific Center, General Electric's and then Honeywell's Cambridge Information Systems Laboratory, NASA's Electronics Research Center, Keydata Corporation, the National Bureau of Economic Research, Computer Corporation of America, Draper Laboratory, Forrester Research, the World Wide Web Consortium, the Free Software Foundation, and Akamai.

The Central Intelligence Agency had a small office in Tech Square. MIT hackers placed a sign nearby, featuring the word "Intelligence". Below were the words "Central" and "Artificial", with arrows pointing in opposite directions.

Hackers tapped into the elevator controls to allow their computers to summon the elevator directly to the ninth floor.

Among the technologies developed at Technology Square are the Multics, CP/CMS, and ITS operating systems, the Maclisp, Logo, MDL, and Scheme programming languages, the Macsyma computer algebra system, the Emacs editor, the Polaroid SX-70 camera (partly), the RSA cryptosystem (partly), the Zork computer game, the Model 204 database management system, the Lisp Machine, the Curl web programming language, and the Akamai content delivery network.

== Bibliography ==
- "MIT leaves behind a rich history in Tech Square". MIT News. March 17, 2004.
- Michael Blanding (August 18, 2015). "The Past and Future of Kendall Square". MIT Technology Review.
- Tom Van Vleck. "Tech Square". Multicians web site.
