= Ats (given name) =

Estonian male given name

- Gender: Male
- Language: Estonian
- Name day: 7 October

Origin
- Region of origin: Estonia

Ats is an Estonian-language male given name.

People named Ats include:

- Ats Amon (1916–1944), Estonian basketball player
- Ats Purje (born 1985), Estonian footballer
