= Antique Telescope Society =

Astronomy society

- Abbreviation: ATS
- Formation: 1992
- Founder: Bart Fried
- Type: Organization
- Legal status: Society
- Headquarters: Dahlonega, Georgia, USA
- President: Michael D. Reynolds
- Website: http://www.oldscope.org

The Antique Telescope Society (ATS) is a society for people interested in antique telescopes, binoculars, instruments, books, atlases, etc. It was established in 1992 and presently based in Virginia, the USA.

The society has an annual meeting. It also publishes the Journal of the Antique Telescope Society and has an active email list. The American astronomer Michael D. Reynolds was the President of the Antique Telescope Society.
