= Above the line =

Above the line may refer to:

- Above the line (filmmaking), an accounting term used in film production to denote expenditures that occur prior to filming
- Above-the-line deduction, a type of tax deduction in the US
- Above the line (advertising), advertising involving mass media
- A component of contract bridge scoring
- A method of voting in the senate for Australian elections
- The Research and Development Expenditure Credit technology tax relief scheme in the UK, colloquially called "Above the Line"
- Above the Line, an entertainment news website founded by reporter Jeff Sneider
- "Above the line" in the Object Pascal programming language, definitions declared in the interface section of a program or unit, above the implementation section

== See also ==
- Below the line (disambiguation)
