= DVVL =

Mechanical component

DVVL is an acronym for Discrete variable valve lift, a mechanical component of which two types exist:

- DVVLd, includes dual cam phasing.
- DVVLi, includes intake valve cam phasing.
