= Automatic height controller =

An automatic height controller (AHC) is an electronic suspension system that automatically adjusts a vehicle's ride height in response to driving conditions, load changes, speed, and terrain. Using sensors, electronic control units (ECUs), and air or hydraulic actuators, the system maintains optimal ground clearance, handling stability, and comfort without driver intervention.

Automatic height control is widely used in luxury SUVs, off-road vehicles, and high-end passenger cars, particularly in systems produced by Toyota, Lexus, Mercedes-Benz, Land Rover, and aftermarket air-suspension manufacturers.

== Function ==
An automatic height controller continuously monitors suspension position and adjusts ride height using electronically controlled actuators. Its main functions include:

=== Load leveling ===
The system compensates for passenger or cargo weight by increasing air or hydraulic pressure, keeping the vehicle at the correct ride height.

Toyota's AHC system for the Land Cruiser and Lexus LX uses hydraulic struts and sensors to maintain level height regardless of load.

=== High-speed lowering ===
At higher speeds, the system automatically lowers the vehicle to reduce aerodynamic drag and improve stability — a function documented in ZF's air-suspension control design.

=== Off-road raising ===
Vehicles with off-road modes (e.g., Land Rover, Toyota, Mercedes) raise the suspension for additional ground clearance.

=== Automatic correction during acceleration and braking ===
Some systems modify height distribution to counteract squat (acceleration) and dive (braking), improving chassis stability.

=== Self-diagnostic capability ===
Modern AHC systems include electronic diagnostics and height-sensor calibration procedures documented in OEM service manuals.

== Operation ==
Automatic height controllers rely on:

- Height sensors mounted on suspension control arms
- Wheel-speed sensors
- Steering-angle sensor
- Load sensors
- Air compressors or hydraulic pumps
- Solenoid valves
- Accumulators and pressure lines
- A suspension ECU (AHC-ECU)

When a height deviation is detected, the ECU activates pumps or valves to raise or lower the suspension.

=== Hydraulic systems ===
Used by Toyota/Lexus AHC and older Mercedes ABC systems.

Hydraulic pressure is modulated to adjust each corner individually.

=== Air-suspension systems ===
Used by Land Rover, Audi, Mercedes AIRMATIC, and many SUVs.

An onboard compressor inflates or deflates air springs to adjust height.

== Benefits ==
- Maintains proper ground clearance regardless of load
- Improves high-speed stability through vehicle lowering
- Allows selectable or automatic off-road clearance
- Reduces body roll and pitch when combined with adaptive dampers
- Increases comfort by optimizing suspension geometry
- Enhances towing capability with automatic leveling

== Limitations ==
- Higher system cost and maintenance complexity
- Air leaks or hydraulic leaks can lead to sagging or pump failure
- Height sensors are prone to corrosion
- Requires periodic calibration after suspension service
- Repairs can be expensive compared to steel-spring suspensions

== See also ==
- Shock absorber
- Air suspension
- Car suspension
