= Bridged and paralleled amplifiers =

Multiple electronic amplifiers can be connected such that they drive a single floating load (bridge) or a single common load (parallel), to increase the amount of power available in different situations. This is commonly encountered in audio applications.

== Overview ==
Bridged or paralleled modes of working, normally involving audio power amplifiers, are methods of using two or more identical amplifiers to drive the same load simultaneously. This is possible for sets of mono, stereo and multichannel amplifiers since the amplifier outputs are combined on a per load basis. Depending on the method of combining separate amplifiers, bridging or paralleling, different amplification goals can be served. The result is an amplifier that can be further combined with bridging or paralleling. This approach can be beneficial for driving loads for which using a single-ended amplifier is impossible, impractical or less cost-effective.

== Bridged amplifier ==
A bridge-tied load (BTL), also known as bridged transformerless and bridged mono, is an output configuration for audio amplifiers, a form of impedance bridging used mainly in professional audio & car applications. The two channels of a stereo amplifier are fed the same monaural audio signal, with one channel's electrical polarity reversed. A loudspeaker is connected between the two amplifier outputs, bridging the output terminals. This doubles the available voltage swing at the load compared with the same amplifier used without bridging. The configuration is most often used for subwoofers.

For a given output voltage swing, the lower the impedance the higher the amplifier load. Bridging is used to allow an amplifier to drive low loads into higher power, because power is inversely proportional to impedance and proportional to the square of voltage, according to the equation $P = V^2/R$. This equation also shows that bridging quadruples the theoretical power in an amplifier, however this is true only for low enough loads. For example, for loads where the amplifier reaches its full potential in single-ended mode, there is no gain to be made with bridging. This is because an amplifier can have current limitations. In practical applications, inadequate heating dissipation and power supply also limit the power increase, although if the bridged amplifiers use separate power supplies, which is typical, the limit increase for high loads is power doubling, since every amplifier only delivers half of the total power.

=== Typical circuit ===
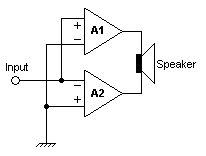
Representative schematic of a bridged amplifier configuration.

Example: The image shows two identical amplifiers A1 and A2 connected in bridge mode. The system is arranged in such a way that the outputs from the amplifiers are inverted with respect to each other. In other words, as the signal in one amplifier is swinging positively, the signal in the other is swinging negatively. When the output of one amplifier is at +10 volts the output of the other will be at −10 volts, and vice versa. The load is connected between the "hot" (often red) outputs of the two amplifiers, and is subject to the potential difference between them. If the instantaneous potential at the output of one amplifier is at +10 volts, then the output of the other one will be at −10 volts, and the potential difference across the load will be 20 volts, or double the potential available from a single amplifier.

The provision of the anti-phase audio input signal can be provided in several ways, which require appropriate knowledge and skill.

1. by an internal modification such as that described by Rod Elliot at https://sound-au.com/project20.htm;
2. by a simple active phase splitter circuit, external to the amplifier;
3. by a phase splitting audio input transformer, external to the amplifier.

=== Benefits and drawbacks ===
Since two amplifiers are being used in opposite polarity, using the same power supply, the bridged output is floating. This makes a DC blocking capacitor between the amplifier and the load unnecessary, saving cost and space and avoiding the power reduction at low frequency due to the capacitor. For the same reason the amplifier outputs should never be grounded or it may damage the amplifier. Damping factor is cut in half, which is beneficial to the power delivery.

=== Amplifier design considerations ===
On audio chat forums, some hobbyists claim that operating an amplifier's stereo pair in bridge mode will deliver four times the power of one of the pair's channels. Given an equivalent load, power delivered is proportional to the square of the voltage, and bridge mode operation doubles the voltage presented. On that basis, a pair of amplifier channels operated in bridge mode should deliver four times the power of a single amplifier, driving the same load. However, this ignores an important consideration that because the potential difference at the load is doubled, the current passing through the load (and through each of the amplifier's outputs) will also be doubled.

Amplifier circuits are typically designed with the lowest-cost components needed to provide the desired performance characteristics. The components that carry the output current from the amplifier will tend to be the smallest (cheapest) that will satisfy the peak current draw when the amplifier is running at maximum power, in the designed mode of operation. Operating an amplifier designed for solo operation in bridge mode will mean that the current in the components that drive the output could peak at twice that which they were originally designed for.

If the components can cope with the additional current beyond the peak current expected for solo operation, then greater power delivery could be achieved. But in the general case, the amplifier can only be expected to work as specified, and operating it beyond the specification will give rise to increased risk of permanent damage to the amplifier circuit.

As such, if an amplifier designed for solo operation is to be re-purposed for bridge mode operation, the load impedance should be doubled. This should mean that the current draw stays within the limits of the amplifier design. In this scenario, the power delivered by the bridged amplifier pair will be twice the power delivered by a single amplifier channel.

However, in some scenarios, amplifiers are designed specifically to operate in bridge mode. Such amplifiers are specifically designed to be able to deliver the necessary current. In such systems, the bridged pair will be able to deliver four times that power that a single amplifier channel would have been able to deliver. The bridge mode option is often used in PA systems and especially in car audio applications to feed bass loudspeakers at high power.

Car audio amplifiers commonly have only a notional 13.8 volt supply, which would ordinarily limit the voltage swing available at the output to + and − 6.9 volts. Whilst it would be possible to achieve higher voltage swings by such means as DC-to-DC conversion of the supply voltage, using a bridge mode design allows for twice the voltage swing with a simpler and lower cost design. This design also increases efficiency by avoiding the power losses of a converter.

== Paralleled amplifier ==
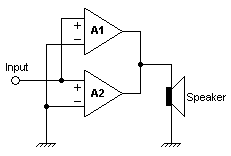
Representative schematic of a paralleled amplifier configuration.

A paralleled amplifier configuration uses multiple amplifiers in parallel, i.e., two or more amplifiers operating in-phase into a common load.

In this mode the available output current is doubled but the output voltage remains the same. The output impedance of the pair is now halved.

The image shows two identical amplifiers A1 and A2 connected in parallel configuration. This configuration is often used when a single amplifier is incapable of being operated into a low impedance load or dissipation per amplifier is to be reduced without increasing the load impedance or reducing power delivered to the load. For example, if two identical amplifiers (each rated for operation into 4 ohm) are paralleled into a 4 ohm load, each amplifier sees an equivalent of 8 ohm since the output current is now shared by both amplifiers — each amplifier supplies half the load current, and the dissipation per amplifier is halved. This configuration (ideally or theoretically) requires each amplifier to be exactly identical to the other(s), or they will appear as loads to each other. Practically, each amplifier must satisfy the following:

- Each amplifier must have as little output DC offset as possible (ideally zero offset) at no signal, otherwise the amplifier with the higher offset will try to drive current into the one with lesser offset thereby increasing dissipation. Equal offsets are also not acceptable since this will cause unwanted current (and dissipation) in the load. These are taken care of by adding an offset nulling circuit to each amplifier.
- The gains of the amplifiers must be as closely matched as possible so that the outputs don't try to drive each other when signal is present. A simple and robust solution is to use paralleled voltage followers, which by design have exactly unity gain, driven by a common voltage amplification stage.

In addition, small resistors (much less than the load impedance, not shown in the schematic) are added in series with each amplifier's output to enable proper current sharing between the amplifiers. These resistances are necessary because the output impedance of the two amplifiers will not, due to manufacturing variation, be perfectly identical. Introduction of output resistors isolates this imbalance and prevents problematic interactions between the two amplifiers.

Another method of parallelling amplifiers is to use current drive. With this approach the close matching and resistances are not needed.

== Bridge-parallel amplifier ==
A bridge-parallel amplifier topology is a hierarchical combination of the bridged and paralleled amplifier topologies, with at least four single-ended channels needed to produce one bridge-parallel channel. The two topologies complement each other in that the bridging allows for higher voltage output and the paralleling provides the current handling capacity needed to drive low impedances, typical in subwoofer applications. It is more commonly used with IC power amplifiers with stereo outputs operating in bridged mode. It can be seen from the preceding sections that a bridged configuration of two amplifier channels delivers four times the power and doubles the dissipation. A paralleled configuration of two amplifier channels delivers the same power and halves dissipation. So when both configurations are combined on a set of four single-ended amplifiers, the power output is increased four-fold but the power dissipation of each constituent amplifier is not increased, and thermal issues are easier to handle.

== Practical applications ==
=== Stereo amplifiers ===
Two identical amplifiers are most often encountered in a common case, with a common power supply, and would normally be regarded as a stereo amplifier. Any conventional stereo amplifier can be operated in bridge or parallel mode provided that the common loudspeaker terminals (normally black) are connected and common to the ground rail within the amplifier. This would turn the stereo amplifier into a mono amplifier.

Some two channel amplifiers, or stereo amplifiers, have the built in facility to operate in bridge mode by operating a switch and observing the input and output connections detailed on the back panel or in the manual. This option is most often found in high power PA equipment or amplifiers designed for car audio applications. Operation in parallel mode requires no special facility and is implemented merely by the appropriate external connection.

Stereo amplifiers usually have a common control for gain and frequently bass/treble and when switched to bridge mode will automatically track each channel identically. Where two channel amplifiers have separate controls, and are switchable to bridge mode, only the controls on one channel will be operational.

Where the user implements their own connections for either bridge or parallel mode, and the amplifiers have individual controls, care should be taken that both sets of controls are set identically.

== See also ==
- Amplifier
- Audio amplifier
- Single-ended signalling
