= Software House =

A Software house is a company whose primary business is designing, developing, and maintaining custom software applications, i.e., software development.

The first software house, the Computer Usage Company (CUC), was founded in March 1955 in New York. The UK's first software house, Vaughan Programming Services, was founded by Dina St Johnston in 1959.

Based on SIC codes there are approximately 16,000 software houses in the US and 28,000 in the UK (the US companies tend to be larger).

The majority of the employees are programmers.
