= Yamaha AT1 =

Adventure Bike produced by Yamaha motor company

== Yamaha AT1 ==
The Yamaha AT1 is a single cylinder enduro motorcycle produced by Yamaha Motor Company from 1969 to 1971. It was part of Yamaha's early efforts to expand their motorcycle lineup and enter the growing off-road market.

=== Specifications ===
Yamaha AT1 Specifications
| Attribute | Value |
|---|---|
| Engine | 123cc, 2-stroke petrol |
| Bore × Stroke | 56 mm × 50 mm |
| Top speed | 60 mph (97 km/h) plus |
| Power | 11.5 BHP at 7,500 rpm |
| Torque | 8.5 ft-lb at 6,000 rpm |
| Transmission | Wet, multiple disc |
| Suspension | Front: Telescopic fork, Rear: Swinging arm |
| Brakes | Internal expansion |
| Wheelbase | 50.6 in (1,290 mm) |
| Dimensions | L: 77.2 in (1,960 mm); W: 35.8 in (910 mm); H: 42.9 in (1,090 mm) |
| Weight | 218 lb (99 kg) (dry); 234 lb (106 kg) (wet) |
| Fuel capacity | 1.9 US gal (7.2 L; 1.6 imp gal) |
| Fuel consumption | 141.1 mpg‑US (1.667 L/100 km; 169.5 mpg‑imp) at 25 mph |

=== Models and Versions ===
The Yamaha AT1 was available in three different models, each corresponding to the year of production:

1. 1969 Yamaha AT1
2. 1970 Yamaha AT1B
3. 1971 Yamaha AT1C

Each year, the AT1 was also available in the Motocross edition designated by an M. The M models were very similar to the regular models other than a few performance-enhancing features, such as weight reduction, higher compression ratio, tuned exhaust, larger carburettor with 26 mm throttle bore, and tuned gearing ratio.

=== Technical Specifications ===
Additional Technical Specifications
| Specification | Value |
|---|---|
| Compression ratio | 7.1:1 |
| Lubrication System | Yamaha Autolube |
| Starting system | Electric for Enduro Versions and kick starter |
| Carburettor | VM24SH |
| Battery | 12V 7AH |
| Ignition system | Battery ignition |

=== Model History and Frame Numbers ===
Model History and Frame Numbers
| Model | Year | Color | Frame Numbers |
|---|---|---|---|
| AT1 | 1969 | Pearl White | AT1-100101 to AT1-119829 |
| AT1M | 1969 | Pearl White (MX Version) | AT1-300101 to AT1-303790 |
| AT1B | 1970 | Competition Yellow | AT1-119830 to AT1-144709 |
| AT1C | 1971 | Competition Yellow | AT1-144710 to AT1-170509 |

=== Parts and Maintenance ===
Some parts, such as fuel tanks, were interchangeable between the AT1 and other Yamaha models of the same era, like the CT1. Yamaha has continued to support these vintage models by producing replacement parts, such as petcocks, which fit the 1969-1971 AT1 models.
