= Adaptive transmission control =

Automotive technology

Adaptive transmission control is an automotive technology that continuously adjusts the behavior of an automatic transmission in response to driving conditions, driver input, and vehicle load. Rather than relying on fixed shift patterns, an adaptive transmission control system evaluates real-time data—such as throttle position, acceleration rate, braking intensity, terrain, and vehicle load—to optimize shift timing, shift firmness, and gear selection.

Adaptive shift systems are widely used in modern automatic, dual-clutch (DCT), and continuously variable transmissions (CVTs). Manufacturers employ adaptive logic to improve fuel economy, reduce wear, and enhance performance and drivability.

== Function ==
Adaptive transmission control relies on microprocessors within a transmission control module (TCM). The TCM gathers sensor data and adjusts shifting based on several key factors:

=== Shift pattern learning ===
Adaptive systems “learn” the driver's behavior over time. Aggressive throttle inputs, rapid braking, and frequent acceleration cause the system to hold gears longer, while relaxed inputs favor earlier upshifts.

=== Load and incline detection ===
Using engine torque signals, vehicle speed, and acceleration data, adaptive systems determine when the vehicle is towing, heavily loaded, or climbing a grade. The transmission may downshift earlier or hold lower gears to maintain power.

=== Throttle-based adaptation ===
Throttle position and rate of pedal movement influence shift strategy. Rapid pedal input triggers quicker downshifts for responsiveness, while light throttle encourages fuel-saving upshifts.

=== Temperature-based adjustments ===
Fluid temperature sensors allow the TCM to modify shift firmness and timing to protect clutches and reduce wear during warm-up or overheating conditions.

=== Dynamic hydraulic pressure control ===
Electronically modulated pressure control valves allow smoother or firmer shifts depending on driver behavior and load conditions.

== Operation ==
Adaptive transmission control systems receive data from:

- Throttle position sensor
- Engine control unit (ECU)
- Transmission input/output speed sensors
- Wheel speed sensors
- Brake signal sensors
- Load/towing detection via torque estimation
- Transmission temperature sensors
- Gear selector position sensors

The TCM processes this information and alters shift strategies accordingly.

In DCTs, the system may pre-select the next gear using predictive algorithms, improving responsiveness.

Resetting adaptive learned values is often required after mechanical repairs, battery disconnection, or transmission replacement.

== Applications ==
Major automotive manufacturers employ adaptive transmission strategies under different trade names:

- BMW: Adaptive Transmission Control (ATC), Steptronic adaptation
- Mercedes-Benz: Adaptive logic in 5G-Tronic, 7G-Tronic, and 9G-Tronic systems
- Ford: Adaptive Shift Strategy (ASS)
- Toyota: AI-Shift Control
- Volkswagen/Audi: Tiptronic and DSG adaptive learning
- ZF: Adaptive control in 6HP, 8HP, and 9HP transmissions
- Aisin: Adaptive logic in Toyota/Lexus automatic transmissions

== Benefits ==
Adaptive transmission control offers several advantages:

- Improved fuel economy due to optimized shift timing
- Smoother gear changes when driving gently
- Increased performance during aggressive driving
- Reduced component wear through thermal compensation and pressure control
- Automatic adjustment to different drivers without manual programming

== See also ==
- Automatic transmission
- Manual transmission
- Transmission Control Module (TCM)
