= Model 204 =

Database management system for IBM mainframes

Model 204 (M204) is a database management system for IBM and compatible mainframe computers developed and commercialized by Computer Corporation of America. It was announced in 1965, and first deployed in 1972. It incorporates a programming language and an environment for application development. Implemented in assembly language for IBM System/360 and its successors, M204 can deal with very large databases and transaction loads of 1000 TPS.

== Product description ==
Model 204 relies on its own type of bitmap index, originally devised by Bill Mann, and combines the use of hash table, B-tree, and partitioned record list technologies to optimize speed and efficiency of database access.

It has been described as "one of the three major inverted-list [database systems] ... the other two being" ADABAS and ADR's Datacom/DB.

Although M204 is a pre-SQL (and pre-relational) database product, it is possible to manually map the files of an M204 database to approximate SQL equivalents and provide some limited SQL functionality using Model 204 SQL Server.

== Users ==
Model 204 is commonly used in government and military applications.

It was used commercially in the UK by Marks & Spencer. It was also used at the Ventura County Property Tax system in California, the Harris County, Texas, Justice Information Management System, and in the New York City Department of Education's Automate The Schools system. An informal list of past and present Model 204 users, compiled in 2010, identified more than 140 organizations worldwide. Beginning in 1986, it was used by the US Navy Fleet Intelligence Center Europe and Atlantic (FICEURLANT).

Model 204 has been a central part of Australian social security for decades. Services Australia have used it for their ISIS system that pays over $110 billion in welfare payments to around 6 million Australians. A 1.5 billion Australian dollar project to replace ISIS was expected to be completed in 2022 but was delayed. The project was scrapped in July 2023 having spent AUD 191 million, since the replacement system (based on Pegasystems business process automation software) took minutes to complete tasks Model 204 could complete in seconds.

In a 2014 media interview, then Treasurer of Australia Joe Hockey stated that the Australian social security system and the Pentagon were the only remaining active Model 204 customers in the world.

=== Corporate information ===
Add-on products for Model 204 database were formerly available from Sirius Software, Inc. Sirius, located in Cambridge, Massachusetts, USA, was acquired by Rocket Software in 2012.

== See also ==
- Entity–attribute–value model
