= Labor Organisation of Brothers-in-Arms =

Labor Organisation of Brothers-in-Arms Aseveljien Työjärjestö
- Leader: Arvi Nuorimo, JE Tuominen
- Founded: 1942
- Ideology: Nazism; Agrarianism
- Political position: Far-right

The Labor Organisation of Brothers-in-Arms (Finnish: Aseveljien Työjärjestö, AT) was a Finnish Nazi party operating from 1942, led by Arvi Nuorimo and JE Tuominen.

== History ==
Finnish National Socialist Labor Organisation
Nuorimo's supporters	United Front-party
Labor Organisation of Brothers-in-Arms

The party was found when the United Front party, led by Tuominen, merged with the supporters of the Nazi leader Nuorimo. The party was most active and popular in Tampere. A considerable number of workers for the aircraft manufacturing company Valtion lentokonetehdas were party members. The party was funded by consul Sylvester Mank.

The party leadership visited Germany in 1942 as guests of the Nazi leadership. The press agency Deutsches Nachrichtenbüro reported about the event and the Danish Nazi magazine Fædrelandet interviewed Nuorimo.

=== Leadership ===
The party founder and leader Nuorimo (formerly Nylund) belonged to a Finnish-American refugee family involved in the Red Guards and labor movement and was actually suspected of spying for the USSR once he moved to Finland. He became involved in National Socialism during the war years.

After the war, Nuorimo was followed by the Red Valpo and he told his life had been threatened, so he moved from Finland to Umeå. He was mentioned in the 1950s in contemporary labor movement publication as a leader in a Finnish-American organization in Worcester, Massachusetts.

== Party program ==
The party program was influenced by both the Nationalsozialistische Deutsche Arbeiterpartei (NSDAP) and Finnish Nazi parties. A peculiarity of the AT program was its emphasis on agrarianism and the rights and wellbeing of farmers, wanting to allow "only those who are farming the land or using it for a similar useful purpose" to own land.
