= Below the line =

Below the line may refer to:

- Below the line (filmmaking), a film's budget excluding actors, producers, director, and writers
- Below the line (advertising), advertising not involving mass media
- A type of contract bridge scoring
- A method of voting in the senate for Australian elections
- Below the Line (1925 film), a 1925 silent film
- Below the Line (2003 film), a 2003 Croatian film
- Below the line in the Object Pascal programming language, refers to the contents of procedures and functions, as well as constants, types and variables declared in the implementation section of a program or unit, below the interface section.

== See also ==
- Above the line (disambiguation)
