= Automate the Schools =

Public school administration system

Automate The Schools
- The main (signon) screen
- Initial release: 1988
- Written in: Model 204
- Type: School administration software
- Website: ATS

Automate The Schools (ATS) is the school-based administrative system used by New York City public schools since 1988. It has many functions, including recording biographical data for all students, handling admissions, discharges, and transfers to other schools, and recording other student-specific data, such as exam scores, grade levels, attendance, and immunization records. It also provides aggregate student and human resources data to school administrators.

Access to the ATS system is strictly limited to school system personnel; however, much of the non-personally identifiable information is available online at the New York City Department of Education website.

== Technical details ==
The software was written in under six months using the Computer Corporation of America's Model 204 database management software.
