= Aliança da Terra =

Aliança da Terra (AT), or the Land Alliance, is a Brazilian non-governmental organization that connects farmers, researchers, environmentalists and entrepreneurs in the agribusiness industry to promote environmental awareness and land management practices in the Amazon region. Alianca da Terra was formed in 2004 by John Cain Carter, an American rancher and pilot based in Mato Grosso, Brazil.
