= Automated truck loading systems =

Trucking automation system

Automated truck loading systems (ATLS) is an automation system for trucking. They are used in the material handling industry to refer to the automation of loading or unloading trucks and trailers with product either on or without pallets, slip sheets, racks, containers, using several different types of automated guided vehicle systems (AGV) or engineered conveyor belt systems that are integrated into vehicles, automating the shipping / receiving and logistics operations.

These conveyor systems are commonly referred to as

- Roller beds
- Slip chains
- T-Bars
- Live Floors
- Roller Tracks
- Belt Floors
- Trailer Skates
- Skate & Tracks
- Slat Floors
- Chain Floors
- Cable Floors
- Powered Cargo Rollers

Some of these systems are used to handle bulk products such as garbage, agriculture products, recycled tires, cotton, bark or sawdust. Manufacturing industries such as automotive, food & beverage, paper, consumer products, appliance manufacturers and uses ATLS systems for incoming materials and outgoing product to increase throughput and streamline production. The transportation industry relies heavily on ATLS material handling systems to rapidly move product via land, sea, and air.

The major advantages of ATLS are:

- Increased trailer loading capacity with 200% to 300% (no wheeled containers needed)
- Trailer unloading time reduced, which results in better trailer utilization
- Reduced manpower
- Increased ergonomics for workforce
- Fewer docks needed (due to higher trailer loading capacity)
- Maximizing sorting machines utilization
- No forklifts needed, which means safer working environment

ATLS vehicle loading technologies significantly reduce the manpower required on the shipping and receiving docks, eliminate product damage, accidents, and ergonomic injuries related to lift-truck operation. Generally, products can be loaded quicker and product density is increased resulting in more payload per shipment which reduces shipping cost, using a loading automation system. Loading automation is often the key component to achieve complete plant automation.

Elder systems need to modify the load zone or the trailer to use these types of systems. Nevertheless, companies like Duro Felguera provides a solution where there is no need of modification. This factor is really important to reduce Capex investments.

== See also ==
- Material handling equipment
