= Basilica Hilariana =

Ancient Roman civic basilica in Rome

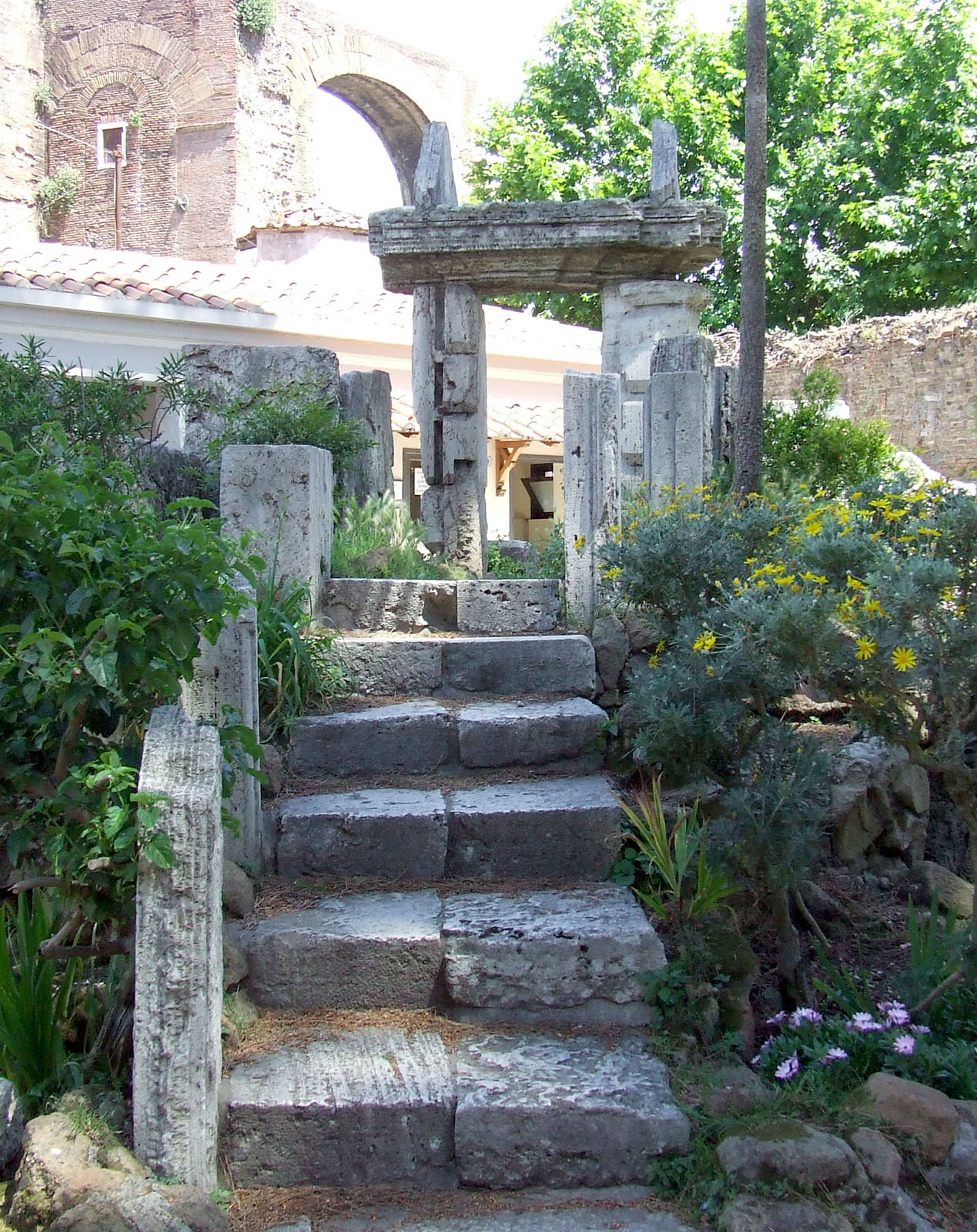
Villa Celimontana, Rome - remains of the Basilica Hilariana, erected by Manius Publicius Hilarus, detail of the staircase leading to the dolmen

The Basilica Hilariana was a sanctuary dedicated by the cult of Cybele on the Caelian Hill in Rome, Italy, in the name of a certain M. Poplicius Hilarus and identified by an inscription in Latin: collegium dendrophorum Matris deum magnae et Attidis, lit. 'college of dendrophori of the Great Mother Goddess and of Attis'. Its vestibule was discovered in 1889 during the construction of Rome's military hospital on the Caelian Hill, the Policlinico militare Celio, along with a mosaic floor and the inscription quoted above. However, its floor plan is unknown.
