= ATIS =

ATIS or Atis may refer to:

== Organizations ==
- Adirondack Trail Improvement Society, a nonprofit organization for trail maintenance in the Adirondack High Peaks area
- Alliance for Telecommunications Industry Solutions, a standards organization for the telecommunications industry
- Allied Translator and Interpreter Section, a joint Australian/American intelligence agency that translated intercepted Japanese communications during World War II
- Association of Translators and Interpreters of Saskatchewan, an organization of language professionals, see Canadian Translators, Terminologists and Interpreters Council

== Science and technology ==
- Automatic Terminal Information Service (aircraft), a broadcast of recorded aeronautical information such as weather at airports
- Automatic Transmitter Identification System (television), used for the station identification of television channels carried on analog satellite TV
- Automatic Transmitter Identification System (marine), ship and transmitter post-transmission identification used on European waterways
- Advanced traveller information system, a feature of Intelligent Transportation Systems

== Other uses ==
- Atis Monteiro (born 1932), Brazilian footballer
- Adventure Thru Inner Space, a former attraction in Disneyland's Tomorrowland
- Aeta, or Atis, an indigenous people who live in isolated mountainous parts of the Philippines
- Sugar-apple, known as atis in the Philippines
- Hatis, a town in Armenia
- Sky Atis, a Czech paraglider design

== See also ==
- Atys (disambiguation)
