= Victoria (mythology) =

Roman goddess of victory

- Goddess of victory
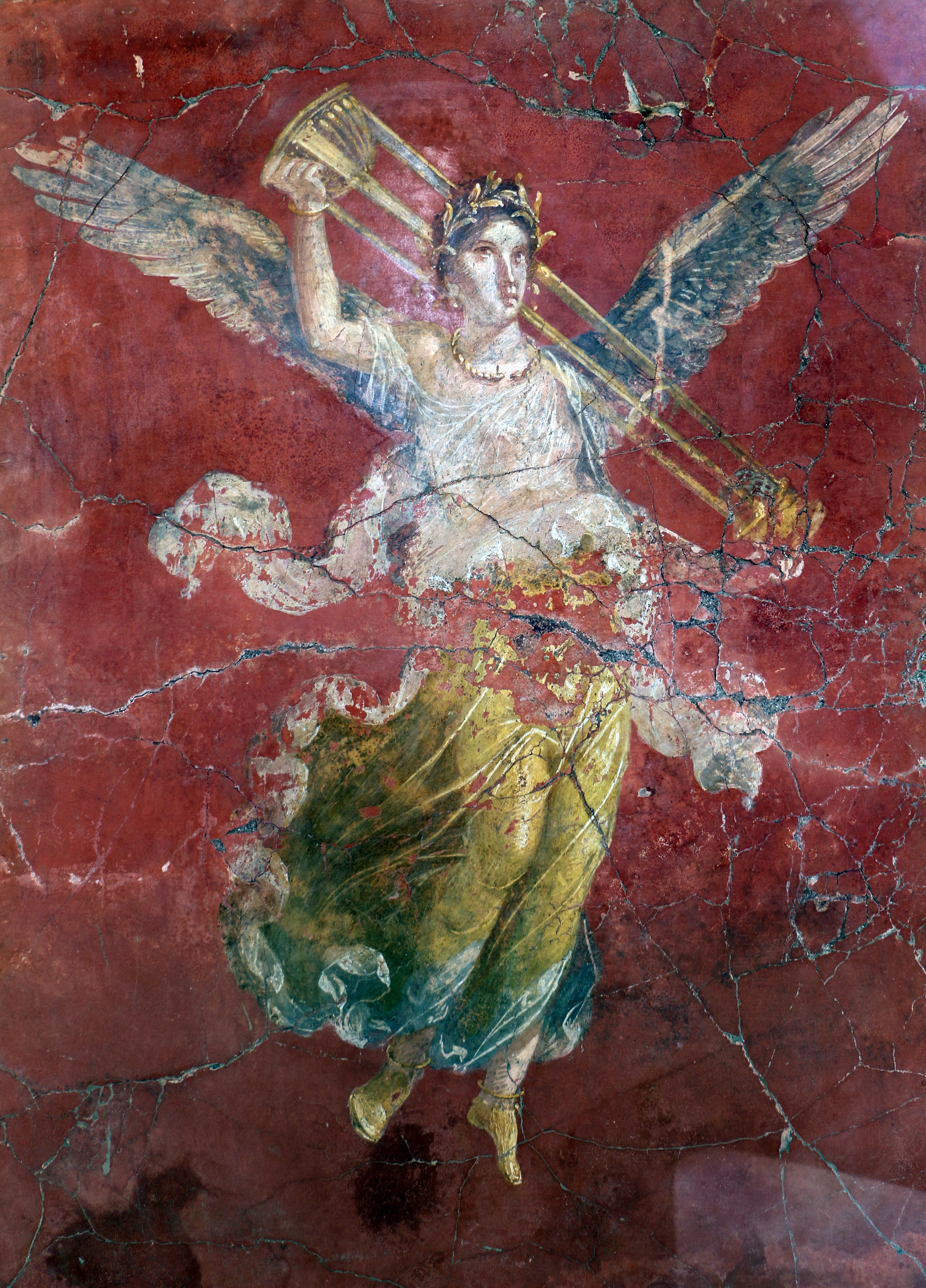
- Victoria (or Nike) on a fresco from Pompeii, Neronian era
- Symbol: Golden sandals, wings, wreaths
- Temple: Temple of Victory, Palatine Hill

Equivalents
- Greek: Nike

In ancient Roman religion, Victoria or Victory is the deified personification of victory. She first appeared during the first Punic War, seemingly as a Romanised re-naming of Nike, the goddess of victory associated with Rome's Greek allies in the Greek mainland and in Magna Graecia. Thereafter she comes to symbolise Rome's eventual hegemony and right to rule. She is a deified abstraction, entitled to a cult, but unlike Nike, she has virtually no mythology of her own.

== History and iconography ==
Victoria first appears during the first Punic War, as a translation or renaming of Nike, the Greek goddess of victory in peace or war. Nike would have become familiar to the Roman military as a goddess of Rome's Greek allies in the Punic Wars. She was worshipped in Magna Graecia and mainland Greece, and was a subject of Greek myth. Around this time, various Roman war-deities begin to receive the epithet victor (conqueror) or invictus (unconquered). By the late republican and early imperial eras, Victoria had become a popular civilian and military goddess, both in association with other deities and in her own right. In 294 BC she was given a temple on the Palatine Hill. It was used to store war-booty, and it hosted the Magna Mater's statue while her own temple was under construction. Victoria had several other shrines throughout Rome. In Imperial-era Timgad, victoria victrix (conquering victory) was given credit for Imperial successes.

Victoria's coin images and cult images are probably based on an original cult image used in her temple. Her cult images show her in the attitude of a winged woman who steps forwards, supported on a globe, and holds aloft (or offers) a wreath or a palm-branch, not symbols of war but of triumph, and a peace that was consequent to victory. Other images show her as human-sized, driving a triumphal war-chariot, or in free-standing statuary, standing on the right-hand palm of a much larger figure, typically Rome's supreme god, Jupiter, or war-god Mars, or Roma, divine personification of the Roman state.

The goddess Vica Pota is sometimes identified with Victoria, but is almost certainly too ancient for her iconography to have been influenced by Greek Nike, so is treated as a separate deity. Victoria is one of many Roman deities associated with the Sabine goddess Vacuna.

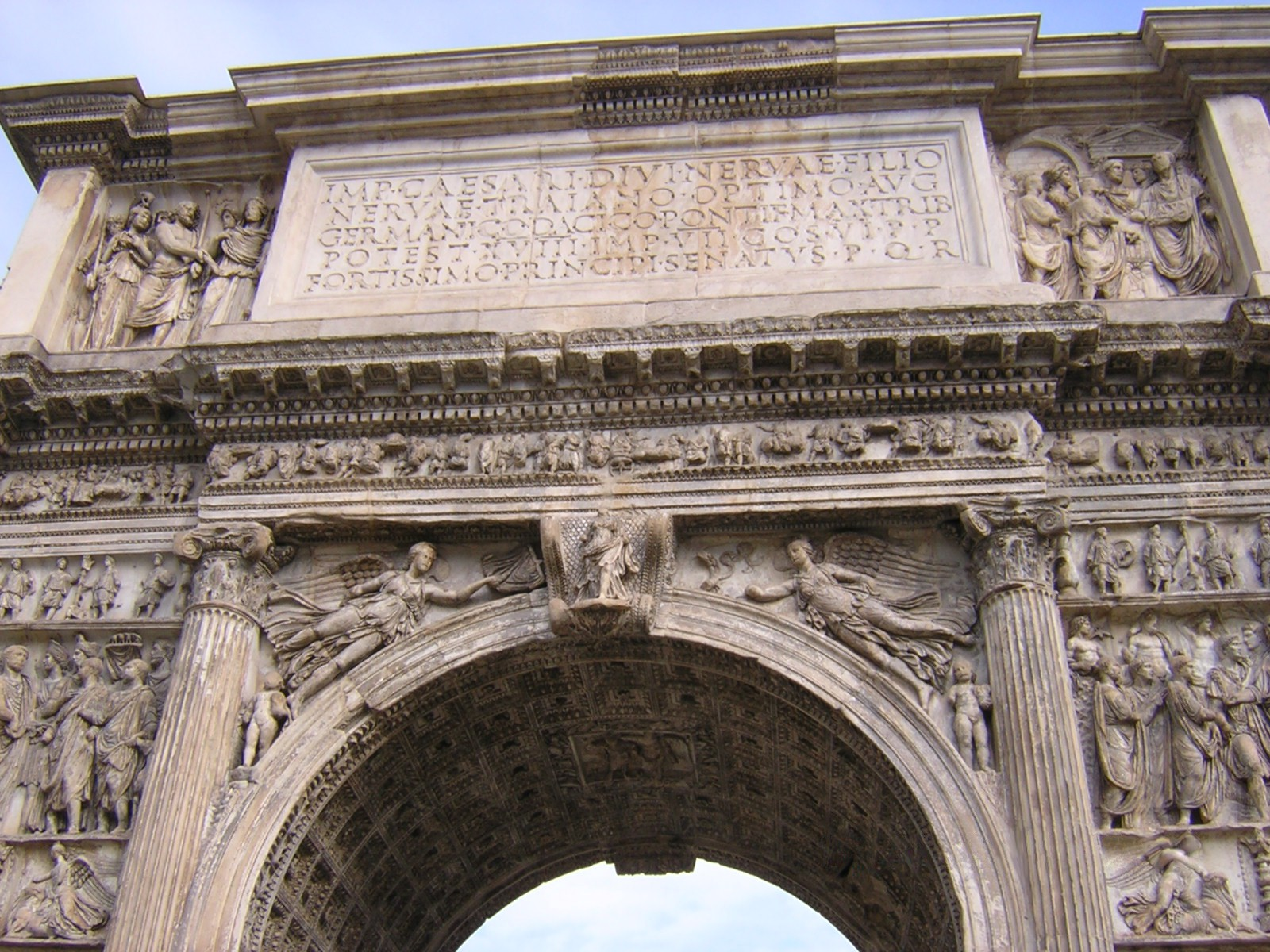
Arch of Trajan (Benevento), with a pair of winged victories in the spandrels

With the ascendancy of Christianity, Rome's religious affairs and institutions remained under the authority of the ruling emperor as pontifex maximus, whether he was Christian or pagan. On the whole, Senates still respected, or at least allowed the performance of pagan sacrificial rites deemed essential to Rome's well-being, including the sacrifice to Victoria at her Senate-house altar before every meeting. This had been an essential procedure ever since the altar had been given by Octavian, in 29 BC. In 379 the Christian emperor Gratian refused the post of pontifex maximus, and abolished state support of Rome's traditional deities and rites. In 382 he had Victoria's altar removed from her temple at the Curia Julia. They had been removed before, by Constantius II, and had been returned after protest. This time, despite widespread anger and anxiety, shared by officials at the highest level, they were not restored.

=== Winged victories ===
Winged figures, very often in pairs, representing victory and referred to as winged victories, are common in Roman official iconography, typically hovering high in a composition, and often filling spaces in spandrels or other gaps in architecture. Sometimes, these represent the "spirit of victory" rather than an actual deity. Pairs of winged victories continued to appear after the Christianization of the Roman Empire and gradually evolved into depictions of Christian angels. A pair, facing inwards, fitted very conveniently into the spandrels of arches, and have been very common in Triumphal arches and similar designs where a circular element is framed by a rectangle.

== Gallery ==
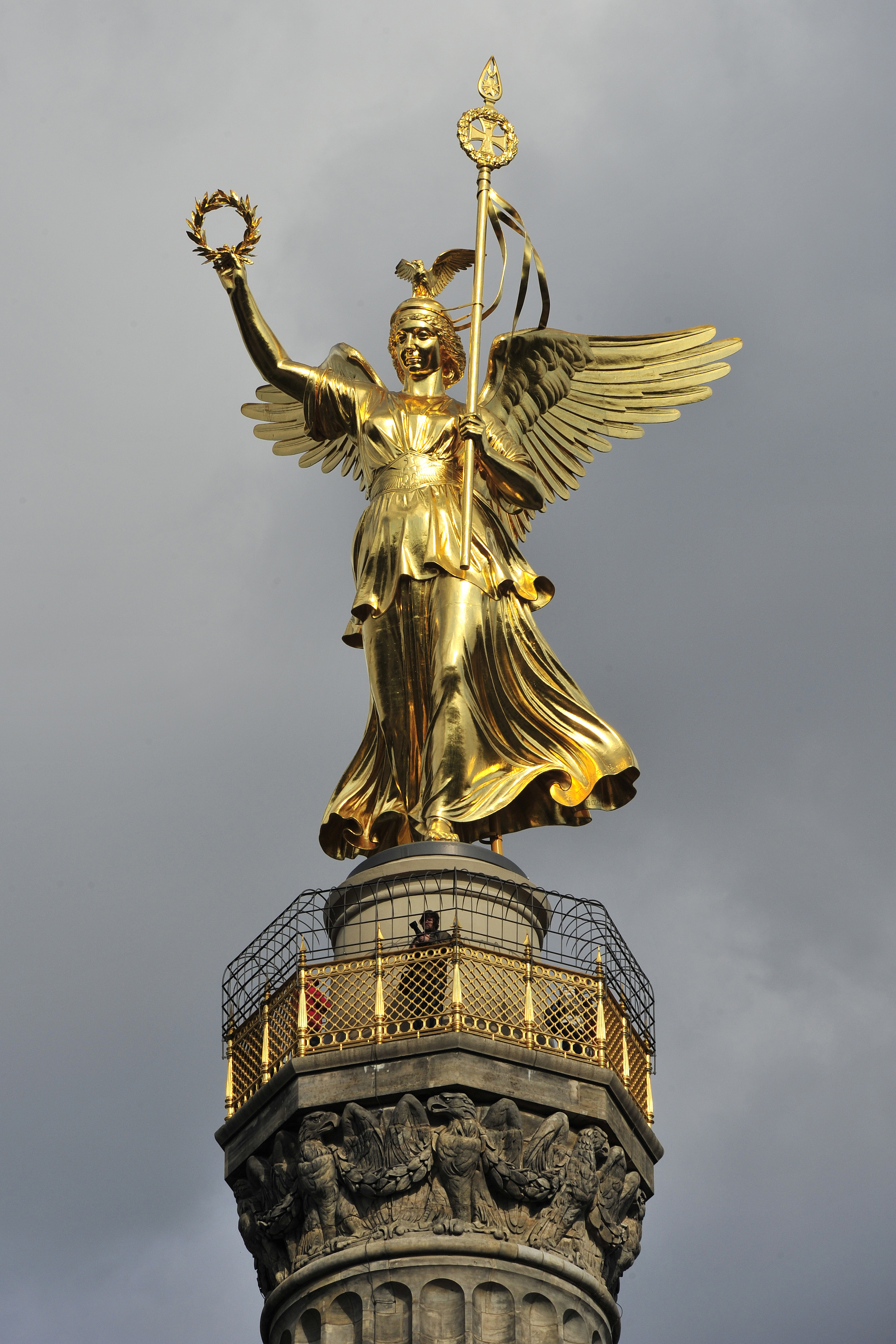
Victoria on top of the Berlin Victory Column. Cast by Gladenbeck, Berlin)

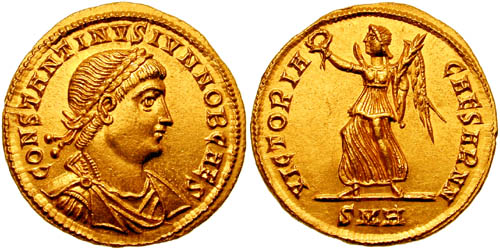
Gold coin of Constantine II depicting Victoria on the reverse

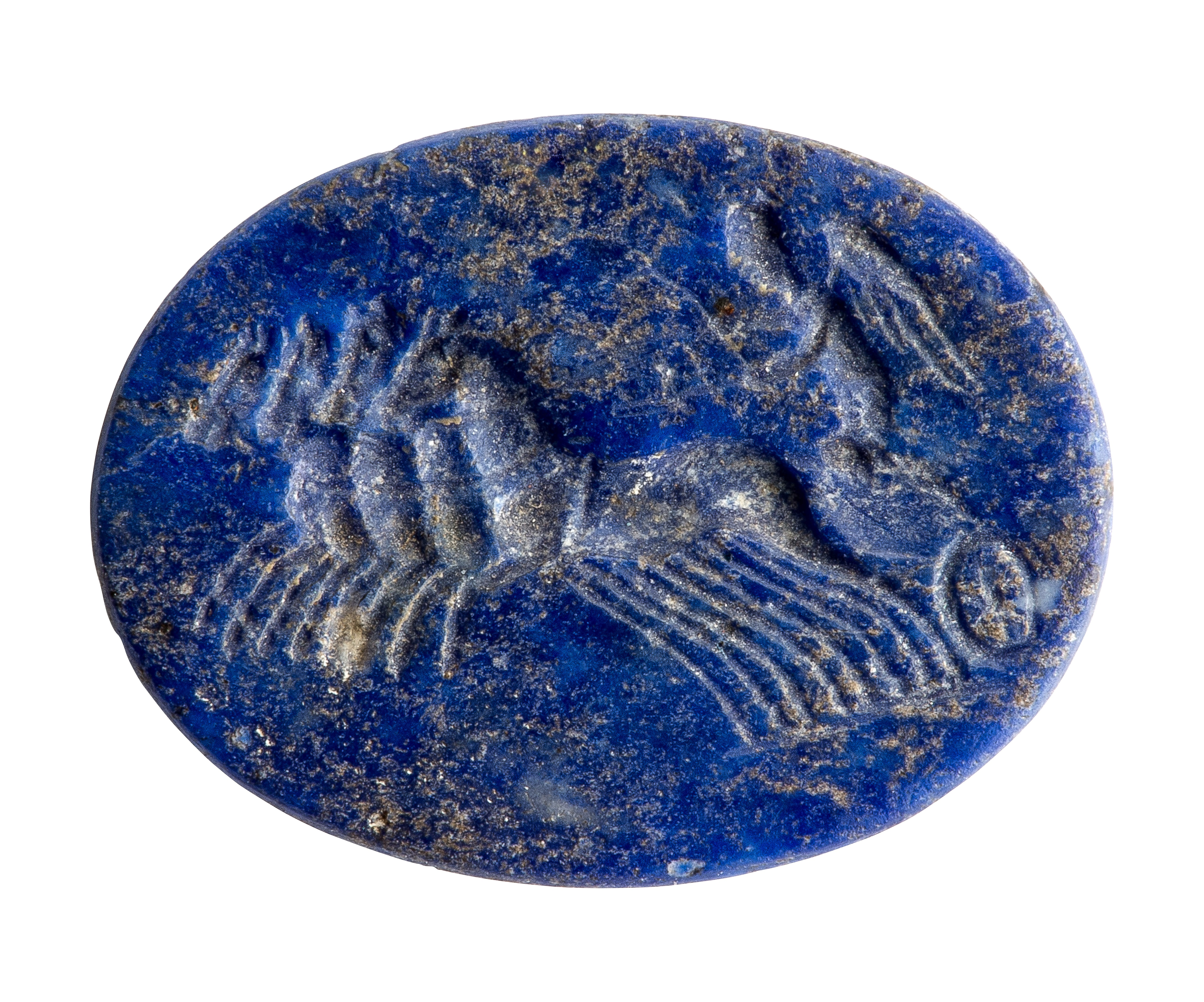
Intaglio in lapis lazuli representing Victoria, 100 - 200 A.D., found in Tongeren Gallo-Roman museum, Tongres

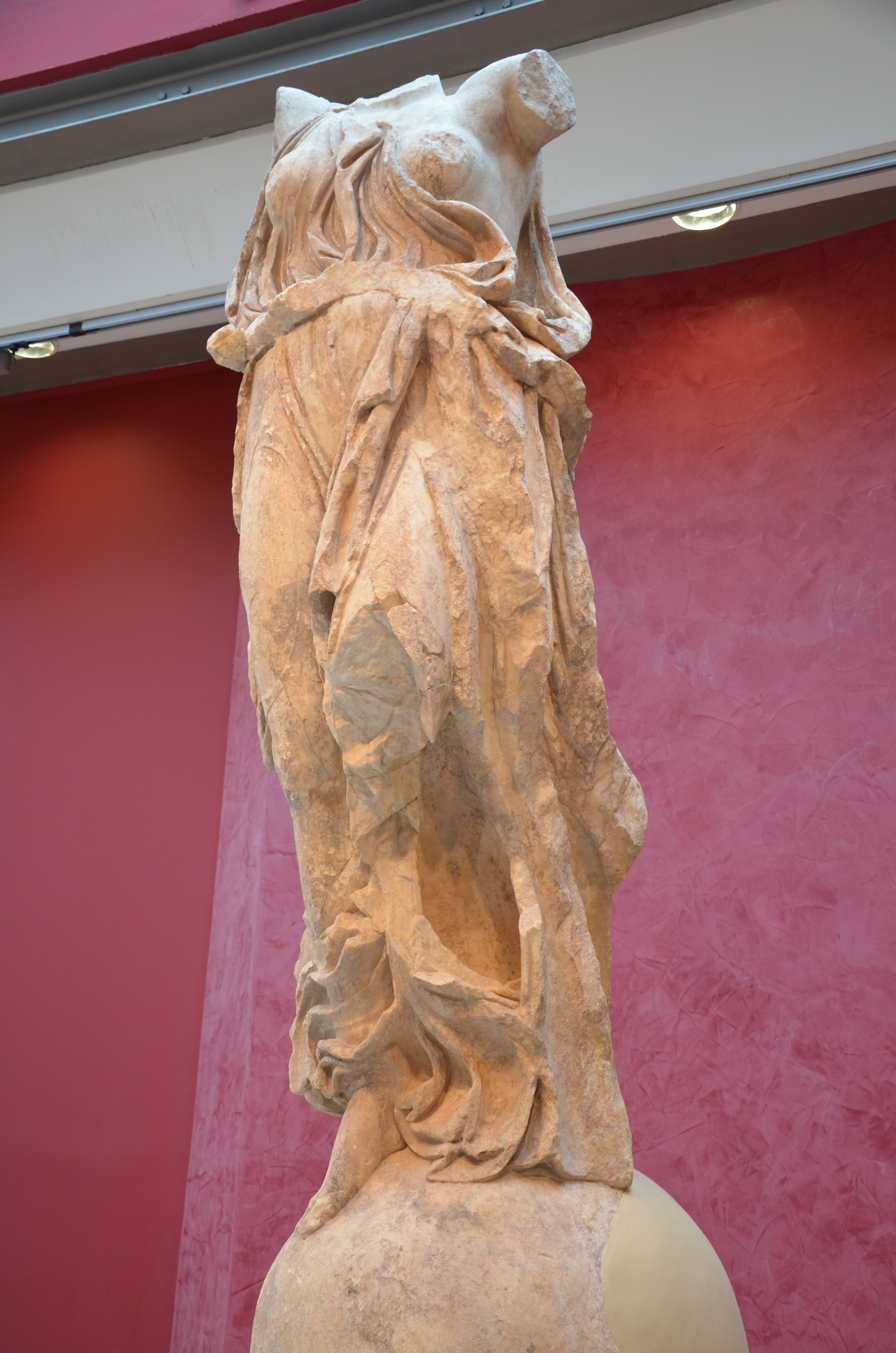
Victoria Romana from Hadrian's Library, c. 18 BC

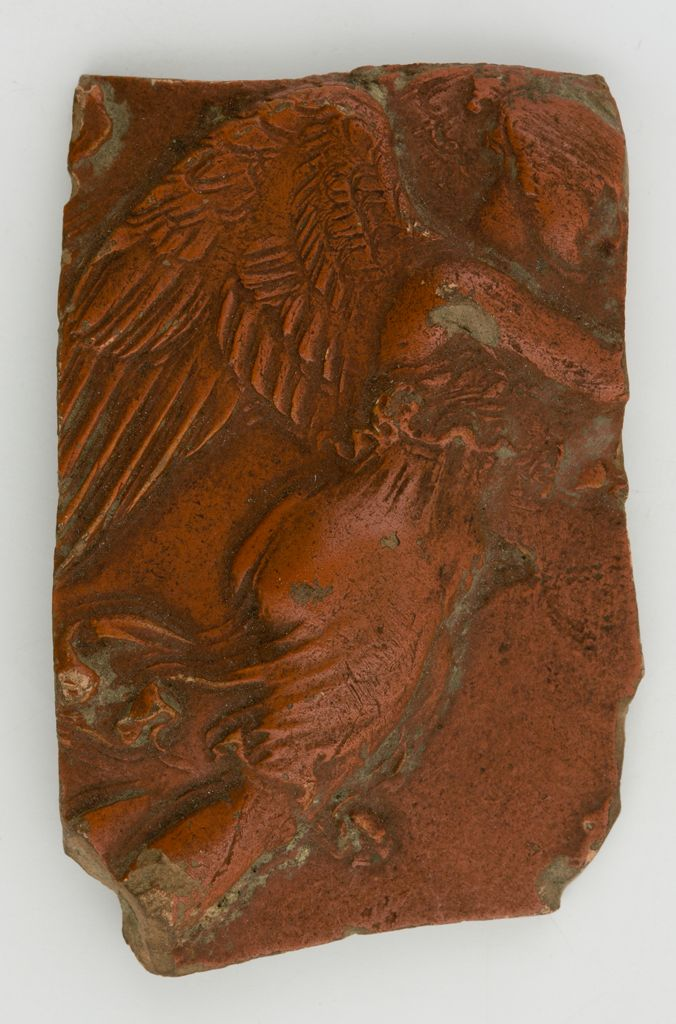
Roman goddess Victoria in Arretine Ware fragment

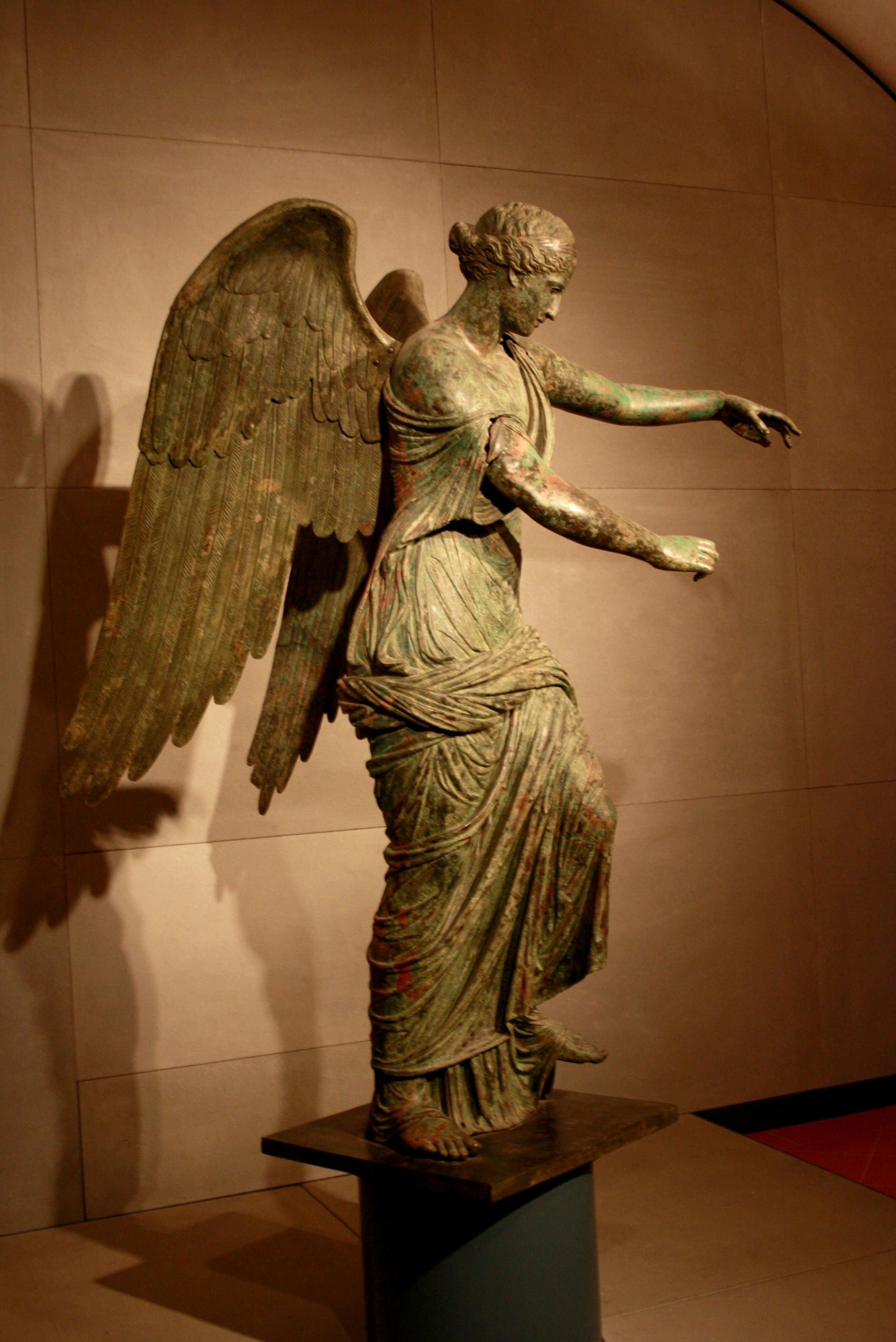
Victory of Brescia, Roman bronze sculpture found in Brescia

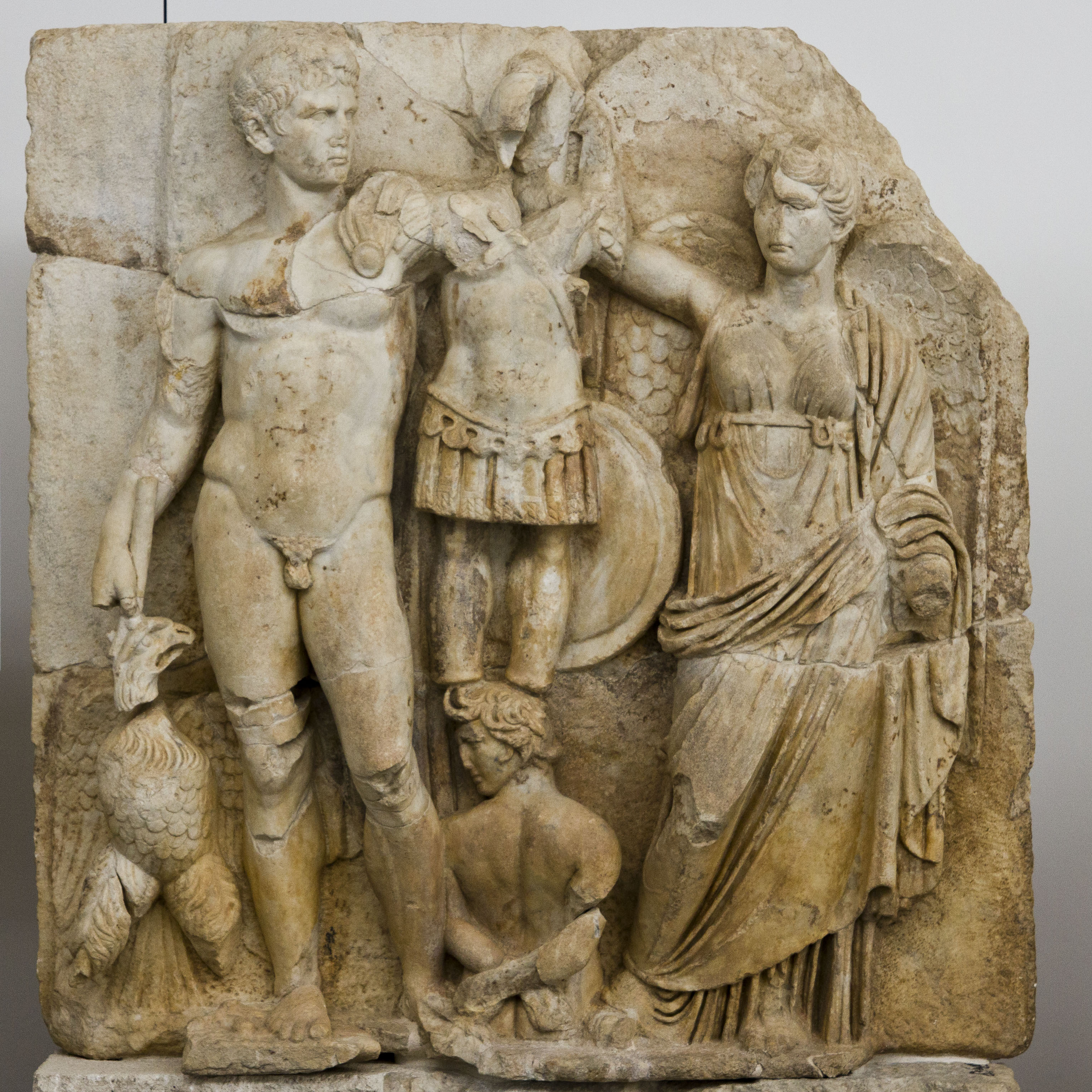
A Roman marble carved relief depicting a deified Augustus standing next to a tropaion ('trophy') crowned by goddess Victory, with an Eagle of Zeus perhaps symbolizing his consecration, dated to the reign of Tiberius (AD 14–37), from the Sebasteion of Aphrodisias, now in the Aphrodisias Museum (Turkey)

== See also ==
- Altar of Victory
- Victoria
- 12 Victoria, asteroid
