= Megalesia =

Ancient Roman festival

The Megalesia, Megalensia, or Megalenses Ludi was a festival celebrated in ancient Rome from April 4 to April 10, in honour of Cybele, whom the Romans called Magna Mater ("Great Mother"). The name of the festival derives from Greek megalē (μϵγάλη), meaning "great". The festival was one of several on the Roman calendar celebrated with ludi, games and performances.

== Background ==
Cybele's cult image was brought to Rome from Pessinus in 204 BC, along with the goddess's Gallae priestesses. As the "Great Mother of the Gods" and a purported ancestral Trojan goddess of Rome's ruling patrician caste, she was recruited to act on Rome's behalf in the war against Carthage. Her arrival was solemnized with a magnificent procession, sacred feasts (lectisternia), games, and offerings to her at the temple of Victory on the Palatine Hill, where her image was temporarily housed. In 203 Cybele was promised a temple of her own. Games in her honour were celebrated in 193. Regular annual celebration of the Megalesia began in 191, with the temple's completion and dedication by Marcus Junius Brutus.

== Festival ==
The Megalesia commenced on April 4, the anniversary of Cybele's arrival in Rome. The festival structure is unclear, but it included ludi scaenici (plays and other entertainments based on religious themes), probably performed on the deeply stepped approach to her temple; some of the plays were commissioned from well-known playwrights. On April 10, her image was taken in public procession to the Circus Maximus, and chariot races were held there in her honour. The racetrack could be seen from her temple's threshold, and a statue of Magna Mater was permanently sited on the racetrack's dividing barrier, showing the goddess seated on a lion's back: the goddess could thus watch the festivities held in her honour.

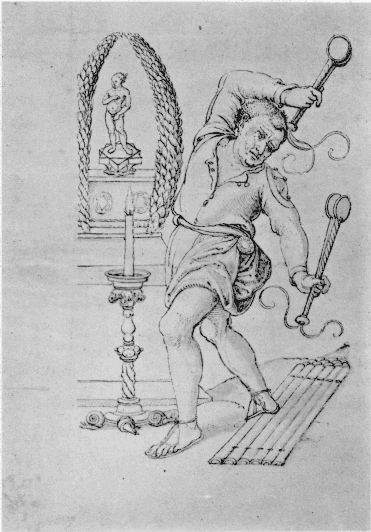
Illustration of the month of April based on the Calendar of Filocalus (354 AD), perhaps either a Gallus or a theatrical performer for the Megalesia

Roman bystanders seem to have perceived Megalesia as either characteristically "Greek"; or Phrygian. At the cusp of Rome's transition to Empire, the Greek Dionysius of Halicarnassus describes this procession as wild Phrygian "mummery" and "fabulous clap-trap", in contrast to the Megalesian sacrifices and games, carried out in what he admires as a dignified "traditional Roman" manner; Dionysius also applauds the wisdom of Roman religious law, which forbids the participation of any Roman citizen in the procession, and in the goddess's mysteries; Slaves are forbidden to witness any of this. In the late republican era, Lucretius vividly describes the procession's armed "war dancers" in their three-plumed helmets, clashing their shields together, bronze on bronze, "delighted by blood"; yellow-robed, long-haired, perfumed Galli waving their knives, wild music of thrumming tympanons and shrill flutes. Along the route, rose petals are scattered, and clouds of incense arise. The goddess's image, wearing the Mural Crown and seated within a sculpted, lion-drawn chariot, is carried high on a bier. The Roman display of Cybele's Megalesia procession as an exotic, privileged public pageant offers signal contrast to what is known of the private, socially inclusive Phrygian-Greek mysteries on which it was based.

During the festival, wealthy Roman nobles played host to each other, in rotation, in honour of the goddess; these were lavish, costly and competitive occasions in which the wealthy sought to impress their inferiors and peers; or in the latter case, to outdo them in extravagance. In direct response to this, the Roman Senate issued a decree in 161 BC, limiting expenditure on meat, wine and silverware for such feasts.

In the late republican era, Cicero attacked his political opponent Clodius for sacrilegious disruption of the casti, sollemnes, religiosi (pure, traditional, religious) rites of Megalesia. Clodius had sought popular support by defecting from a patrician to a plebeian gens. The Megalesia was a predominantly patrician affair; and in an apparent attempt to undermine patrician privilege, Clodius had hired slave-gangs to forcibly take control of the festival. The attempt was a failure, and Clodius was prosecuted for this and other outrages against Rome's traditional and social proprieties.

== See also ==
- Sacerdos Matris Deum Magnae Idaeae

== Notes ==
- Lane, Eugene, (Editor) Cybele, Attis, and Related Cults: Essays in Memory of M.J. Vermaseren, Brill, 1996.
- Roller, Lynn Emrich (1999). In Search of God the Mother: The Cult of Anatolian Cybele. Berkeley and Los Angeles, California: University of California Press. ISBN 0-520-21024-7.
- Cicero 'De Haruspicum Responsis'
