= Dendrophori =

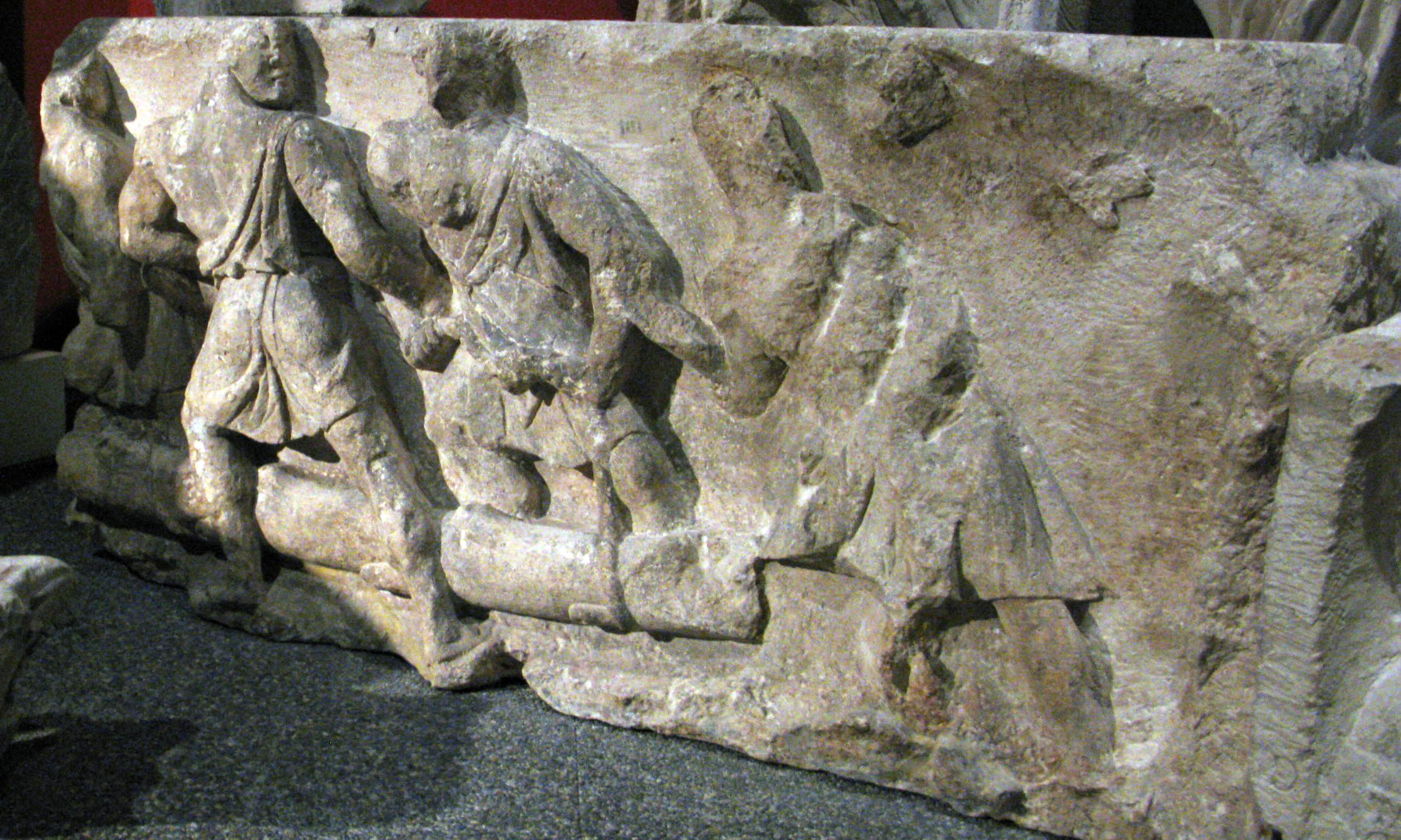
Relief of the Dendrophori, découvert à Bordeaux en 1838 (Musée d’Aquitaine)

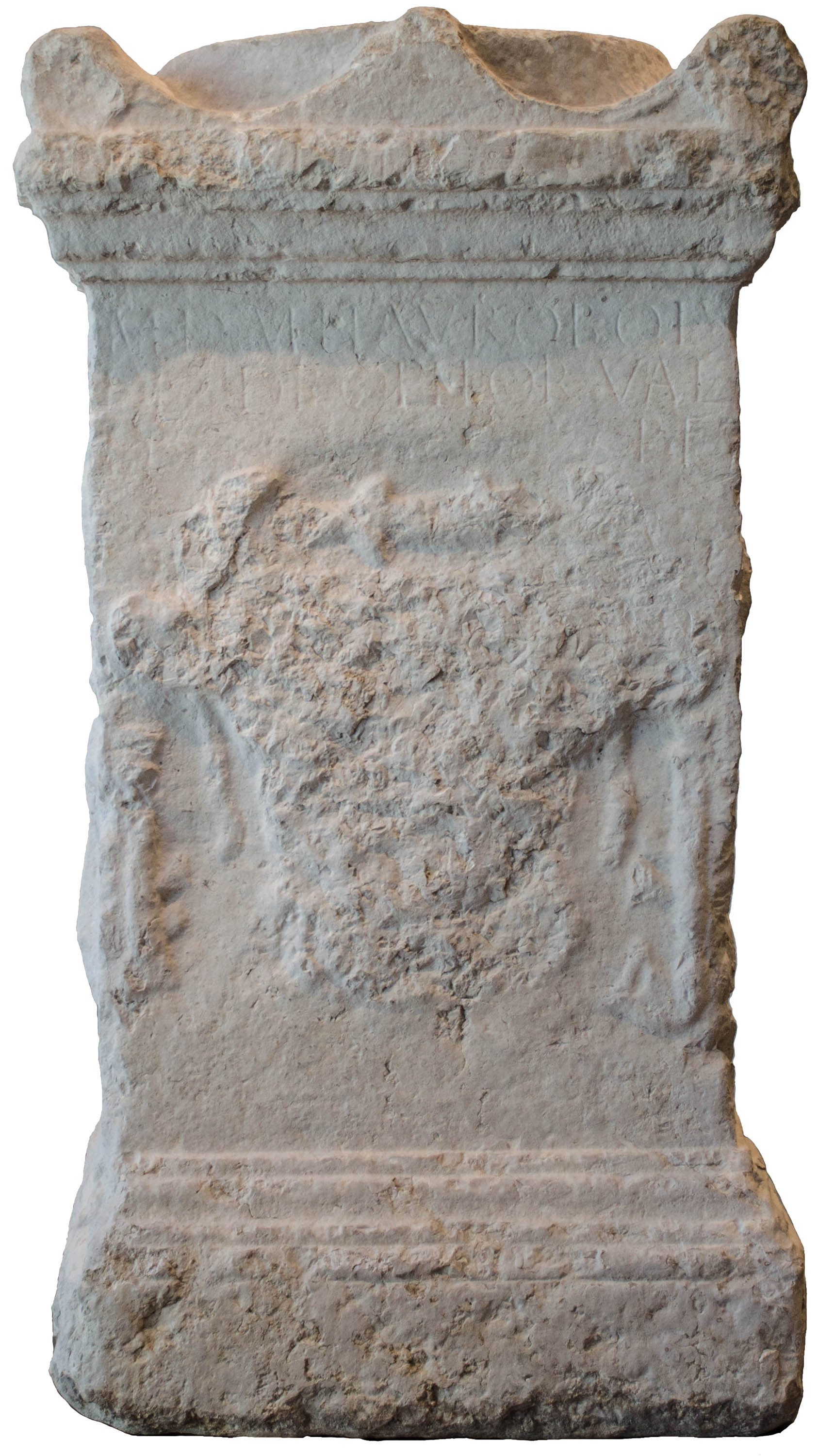
Taurobolic Altar offered by the dendrophori of Valence, found at Châteauneuf-d’Isère. Musée des beaux-arts de Valence (Drôme).

In Ancient Rome, the dendrophori (a direct borrow from Greek meaning "tree-bearers") were workers in the domain of wood: woodcutters, log-bearers, carpenters, etc. The dendrophori had an important ceremonial function in the cult of Magna Mater, carrying the sacred pine representing the body of Attis after his death.

== Cult of Attis ==
Attis, and his relationship with his mother and lover, Cybele, forms the subject of multiple legends. In them, Attis is represented as a young man, often as a shepherd. Cybele falls violently in love with him, but he rejects her for another. Furious, Cybele punishes him by driving him mad. He flees into the forest and, taking up a sharp stone, castrates himself. From the blood that flows from his wound onto the ground, the pine tree––evergreen, symbol of eternity––is born. Her anger appeased, Cybele restores him to life.

During the ceremonies in Attis' honor, especially those of 22 March but also in other ceremonies such as the taurobolium, the dendrophori would cut down a pine tree, cover it in violets and linen bandages, tie it to a sculpture of Attis, and carry it as if it were a dead body into the city. This act was known as the arbor intrat. On 24 March occurred the sanguinalia, meaning "festival of blood," where the priests of Cybele, the Galli, would scarify or castrate themselves. Then, after a night representing the reuniting of Attis with the goddess, the mourning was over and joy ensued.

The dendrophori are sometimes mentioned on the taurobolic altars, such as the one in Lyon. An altar found in 1786 at Châteauneuf-sur-Isère, and now in the museum of Valence, was from a taurobolium commissioned by a dendrophor.

== Collegia of the dendrophori ==
Like many other trades, the dendrophori were organized into professional corporations known as collegia. The collegium dendrophorum was one of the most influential of the collegia, along with the fabri (builders) and the centonarii (textile workers). These three collegia were known collectively as the tria collegia principalia. They also functioned as firefighters, collaborating in this with the other two of the tria collegia. This function was a source of prestige, though its importance among the duties of the dendrophori is still debated. The collegia of the dendrophori seem to have been created by Claudius. The collegium was banned in 415 A.D. by Theodosius II and Honorius.

149 inscriptions, dated between 79 and 288 AD, testify to the dendrophori.

== Sources ==
- Jean-Marie Salamito, Les dendrophores dans l’empire chrétien, Mélanges de l’École française de Rome, Antiquité, année 1987, vol. 99, numéro 99–2, p. 991-1018 Persée.fr
