= Hilaria =

Ancient Roman religious festival

- Observed by: Historically: Romans
- Type: Cultural, Pagan
- Significance: Vernal equinox, death and resurrection of Attis
- Celebrations: Ritual mourning, symbolic decoration, processions, games, masquerades
- Date: 22–25 March (or 10–7 days before the April new moon)
- Frequency: Annual

The Hilaria (/hɪˈlɑːriə/; Latin "the cheerful ones", a term derived from the borrowed adjective Ancient Greek: ἱλαρός "cheerful, merry") were ancient Roman religious festivals celebrated on the March equinox to honor Cybele.

== Origins ==
The term seems originally to have been a name which was given to any day or season of rejoicing. The hilaria were, therefore, according to Maximus the Confessor either private or public. Among the former, he thinks it the day on which a person married, and on which a son was born; among the latter, those days of public rejoicings appointed by a new emperor. Such days were devoted to general rejoicings and public sacrifices, and no one was allowed to show any symptoms of grief or sorrow.

The Romans also celebrated hilaria as a feria stativa, on March 25, the seventh day before the Calends of April, in honor of Cybele, the mother of the gods; and it is probably to distinguish these hilaria from those mentioned above, that the Augustan History calls them Hilaria Matris Deûm. The day of its celebration was the first after the vernal equinox, or the first day of the year which was longer than the night. The winter with its gloom had died, and the first day of a better season was spent in rejoicings. The manner of its celebration during the time of the republic is unknown, except that Valerius Maximus mentions games in honour of the mother of the gods. Respecting its celebration at the time of the empire, Herodian writes that, among other things, there was a solemn procession, in which the statue of the goddess was carried, and before this statue were carried the most costly specimens of plate and works of art belonging either to wealthy Romans or to the emperors themselves. All kinds of games and amusements were allowed on this day; masquerades were the most prominent among them, and everyone might, in his disguise, imitate whomsoever he liked, even magistrates.

The Romans took this feast originally from the Greeks, who called it Ἀνάβασις, Latin Ascensus: the eve of that day they spent in tears and lamentations, calling it Κατάβασις (Latin Dēscensus). Greek writers later borrowed the Latin name as Ἱλάρια, as appears from Photios I of Constantinople's Bibliotheca in his codex of the life of the philosopher Isidore of Alexandria.

== Festival structure ==
Sallustius, writing in the 4th century AD, described the basic multi-day structure of the festival as it related to the myth of Cybele and Attis: "And at first we ourselves, having fallen from heaven and living with the nymph, are in despondency, and abstain from corn and all rich and unclean food, for both are hostile to the soul. Then comes the cutting of the tree and the fast, as though we also were cutting off the further process of generation. After that the feeding on milk, as though we were being born again; after which come rejoicings and garlands and, as it were, a return up to the Gods."

According to the calendar in the Chronography of 354, ten days before the calends of April was the Arbor Intrat, or "entering of the tree". According to Arnobius, in his Against the Pagans (book V), this involved cutting down a pine tree and setting it up in a place of honor inside a temple of Cybele. Fleeces of wool would be tied around the tree trunk, representing the goddess wrapping the dying Attis against the cold. The branches would be decked in wreathes of violets, as "the Mother adorned with early flowers the pine which indicates and bears witness to the sad mishap." The priests would ritually mourn for the dead Attis, beating their chests and wailing. Following this, according to Arnobius, worshipers would fast and, in particular, abstain from bread, "in imitation of the time when the goddess abstained from Ceres' fruit in her vehement sorrow", and they would enter a state of mourning, wounding their arms and breasts.

The full festival can be tentatively reconstructed (with the days of the festival literally translated) as follows:

- 15 March. "The Reed Entered". Its exact significance is uncertain (the reeds may refer to the river bank where Attis was exposed as a child and rescued by Cybele). A nine-day period of abstinence from bread, pomegranates, quinces, pork, fish, and probably wine began. Only milk was permitted as a drink.
- 22 March. "The Tree Entered" (Arbor intrat). A pine tree is felled. The tree is set up at the Temple of Cybele, its trunk wrapped in wool, and its branches decked with wreathes of violets.
- 23 March. A day of mourning.
- 24 March. "The Day of Blood" (Sanguis). Frenzied rites including scourging and whipping. Castration rituals would take place on this day. The tree is symbolically buried.
- 25 March. "The Day of Joy" (Hilaria) celebrating the resurrection of Attis. This was the hilaria proper (as opposed to the mournful tone of the previous days).
- 26 March. A day of rest.
- 27 March. "The Washing" (Lavatio). Added by Marcus Aurelius.
- 28 March. Possible ceremony at the Vatican sanctuary. Appears in the Calendar of Philocalus.

== Other ==
According to the Calendar of Filocalus from 354, a Hilaria of Isis formed part of the Isia festival, taking place on its final day, November 3.

The return to life of Attis has parallels in other death/resurrection traditions such as those associated with Christ and Easter.

== On this day ==
Herodian details an assassination plot by Maternus against Emperor Commodus that was to occur on the hilaria. Maternus planned to disguise himself and his followers as members of the Praetorian Guard, and proceed among the true members of the Guard, until they were close enough to kill Commodus. However, one of Maternus's followers revealed the plot ahead of time, betraying him because, according to Herodian, his men "preferred a legitimate emperor to a robber tyrant". On the day of hilaria, he was beheaded and his followers punished. The public celebrated the emperor's safety, and Commodus sacrificed to Cybele for protecting him from harm.
