= Dies sanguinis =

Ancient Roman festival

Dies Sanguinis ("Day of Blood"), also called Sanguinaria, was a festival held in Ancient Rome on the spring equinox. Due to discrepancies in different calendar systems, this may be reflected as anytime between 21 and 25 March. Festivities for the god Attis were celebrated from 15 to 28 March.

== Order of festivities ==
Following two days of mourning for the annual death of the god Attis, the Day of Blood arrived. On this day the galli, priests of the goddess Cybele, carried out a ritual of self-flagellation, whipping themselves until they bled. Some are also said to have castrated themselves. The Day of Blood was followed by a Day of Joy and Relaxation (Hilaria and Requietio) to celebrate Attis' resurrection. This was followed by a rest day, and then a day of revelry during which an image of Cybele was bathed in the Little Almo River (Lavatio).
