= Sacerdos Matris Deum Magnae Idaeae =

Ancient Roman priestess

Sacerdos Matris Deum Magnae Idaeae was the title of the Priestess of the goddess Cybele in Ancient Rome.

The office was introduced when the cult of Cybele was officially introduced in Rome in 204 BC. The Priestess of Cybele served alongside a male priest of Cybele as the two leaders of the cult; together, they supervised the galli, the assistants, who performed other tasks around the liturgy, such as providing the holy music. Officially, the Priestess as well as the priest were to be from Phrygia, the home country of the Goddess; in practice, they may not always have been from Phrygia, but they were always foreigners. In contrast to the priest, who castrated himself, the priestess performed no bodily changes of herself.

The priestess and the priest lead the official procession of the Goddess during the festival ludi Megalenses: they were dressed with the image of the Goddess on their breast, beat a sacred drum called tympana, and performed a ritual form of beggary called metragyrtai, while the galli played the procession music. Additionally, the Priestess carried a small figure depicting the Goddess.
