= Galli =

Eunuch priest of the Phrygian goddess Cybele

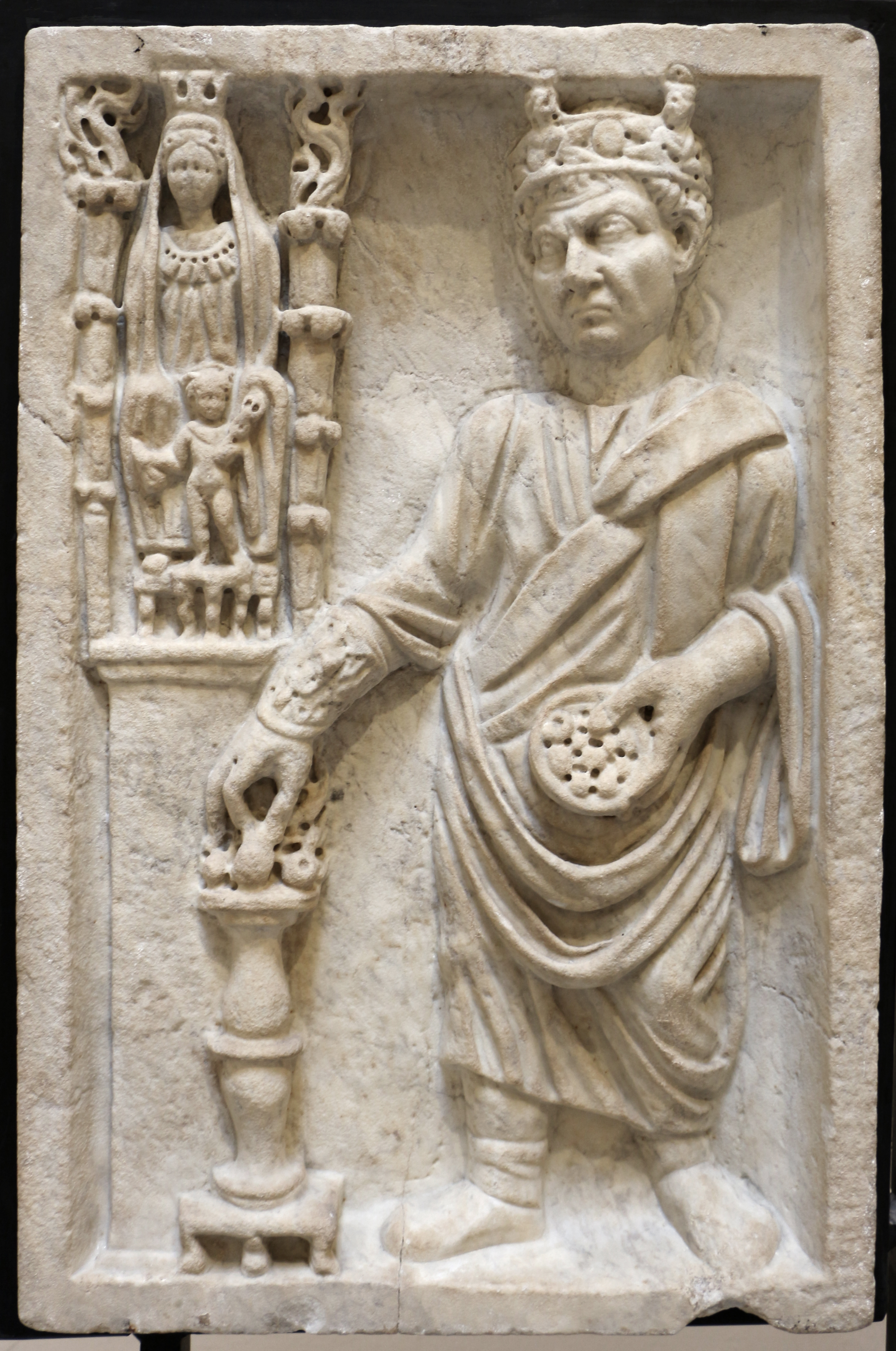
Relief of an archigallus making sacrifices to Cybele and Attis, Museo Archeologico Ostiense, Ostia Antica

A gallus (pl. galli) was a eunuch priest of the Phrygian goddess Cybele (Magna Mater in Rome) and her consort Attis, whose worship was incorporated into the state religious practices of ancient Rome.

== Origins ==
Cybele's cult may have originated in Mesopotamia, arriving in Greece around 300 BCE. It originally kept its sacred symbol, a black meteorite, in a temple called the Megalesion in Pessinus in modern Turkey.

In Phoenicia, the Galli were male religious devotees who adopted feminine clothing, appearance, and behavior, and performed ecstatic dances and rituals while carrying symbols of their goddess, Astarte, sometimes engaging in sexual acts as part of their religious practices, particularly at temples such as the one in Afqa.

The earliest surviving references to the galli come from the Greek Anthology, a 10th-century compilation of earlier material, where several epigrams mention or clearly allude to their castrated state.

Stephanus Byzantinus (6th century CE) said the name came from King Gallus, while Ovid (43 BC – 17 CE) said it derived from the Gallus River in Phrygia. The same word (gallus singular, galli plural) was used by the Romans to refer to Celts and to roosters, and the latter especially was a source of puns. Considering the Mesopotamian connection, and the similarities between Cybele and Inanna, a common etymology between the galli and the much earlier Sumerian priests of Inanna, known as the Gala, is plausible, but this is not as yet conclusive.

Although Galli was the conventional Latin plural, Catullus uses the feminine plural Gallae in his poem 63 (lines 12 and 34). However, his depiction of Attis does not straightforwardly identify the castrated priest as a woman. The narrator describes Attis as notha mulier ("spurious woman", line 27), while Attis subsequently refers to himself as vir sterilis ("sterile man", line 69). Although feminine grammatical forms predominate following Attis's castration, these expressions qualify his femininity and contribute to the poem's portrayal of his ambiguous sexual and gender status.

== Arrival in Rome ==
The cult of Magna Mater arrived in Rome sometime in the 3rd century BCE, towards the end of the Second Punic War against Carthage. There are no contemporary accounts of its arrival, but later literary sources describe its import as an official response to meteor showers, crop failures and famine in 205 BCE. The Senate and the Syblline books identified these events as prodigies, signs of divine anger against Rome and warnings of Rome's imminent destruction, which should be expiated by Rome's official import of the Magna Mater and her cult; with the goddess as an ally, Rome might see an end to the famine and victory over Carthage. In 204 BCE, the Roman Senate officially adopted Cybele as a state goddess. Her cult image was brought from her sanctuary in Asia Minor, and eventually into the city, with much ceremony. According to Livy, it was brought to the Temple of Victory on the Palatine Hill on the day before the Ides of April, and, from then on, the anniversary was celebrated as the Megalesia on April 4–10 with public games, animal sacrifices, and music performed by the galli. Over a hundred years later (according to Plutarch), when the Roman general Marius planned to fight the Germanic tribes, a priest of the galli named Bataces prophesied Roman victory and consequently the Senate voted to build a victory temple to the goddess.

=== Reception ===
Dionysius of Halicarnassus claimed that Roman citizens did not participate in the rituals of the cult of Magna Mater. Literary sources call the galli "half-men" (semiviri), or "half-women" (ἡμίθηλυς), leading scholars to conclude that Roman men looked down upon the galli. But Roman disapproval of the foreign cult may be more the invention of modern scholars than a social reality in Rome, as archaeologists have found votive statues of Attis on the Palatine hill, meaning Roman citizens participated on some level in the reverence of Magna Mater and her consort.

Valerius Maximus, writing in the first century CE, records a legal dispute concerning Genucius, a priest of Magna Mater, in 77 BCE. Genucius had been named as an heir and initially obtained possession of the inheritance through the urban praetor, Gnaeus Orestes. However, the consul Mamercus Aemilius Lepidus overturned the decision, arguing that Genucius, having voluntarily undergone castration, should be counted among neither men nor women (neque virorum neque mulierum numero haberi debere). Valerius Maximus approved of the ruling, describing Genucius's presence and voice as polluting the magistrates' tribunal.

The archigallus was a Roman citizen who was also employed by the Roman State and therefore walked a narrow line: preserving cult traditions while not violating Roman religious prohibitions. Some argue that the archigallus was never a eunuch, as all citizens of Rome were forbidden from eviratio (castration). (This prohibition suggests that the original galli were either Asian or slaves.) Claudius, however, lifted the ban on castration; Domitian subsequently reaffirmed it. Whether or not Roman citizens could participate in the cult of Magna Mater, or whether its members were exclusively foreign-born, is therefore the subject of scholarly debate.

=== In the provinces ===
The remains of a Roman gallus from the 4th century CE were found in 2002 in what is now Catterick, England, dressed in women's clothes, in jewelry of jet, shale, and bronze, with two stones in his mouth. Pete Wilson, the senior archaeologist at English Heritage, said, "The find demonstrates how cosmopolitan the north of England was." The archaeological site at Corbridge, a significant Romano-British settlement on Hadrian's Wall, has an altar to the goddess Cybele.

A fourth-century cemetery was excavated at Hungate in York, where one of the burials has been identified as potentially that of a member of the galli. This is based on the evidence that although the bones appeared to be male, the person was buried with jet bracelets, a material that is strongly associated with women. These aspects are also similar to that of the gallus burial from Catterick.

The 5th century CE Christian philosopher St. Augustine wrote about the galli in Carthage in his work The City of God. In it, he complained, "These effeminates, no later than yesterday, were going through the streets and places of Carthage with anointed hair, whitened faces, relaxed bodies, and feminine gait, exacting from the people the means of maintaining their ignominious lives."

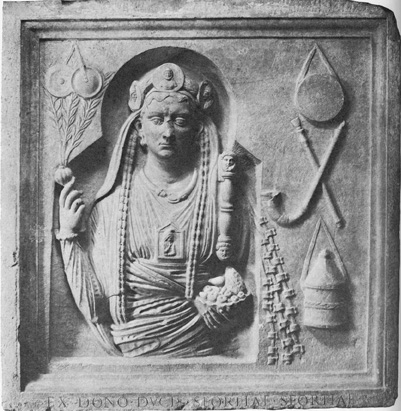
Funerary relief of an archigallus from Lavinium, mid-2nd century AD, Capitoline Museums, Rome

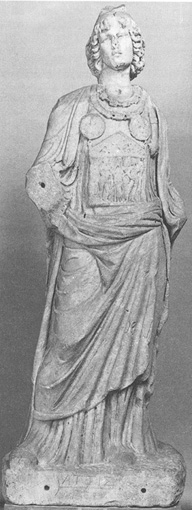
Statue of a gallus priest, 2nd century, Musei Capitolini

== Religious practices ==
The galli castrated themselves during an ecstatic celebration called the Dies sanguinis, or "Day of Blood", which took place on March 24. On this day of mourning for Attis, they ran around wildly and dishevelled. They performed dances to the music of pipes and tambourines, and, in an ecstasy, flogged themselves until they bled. This was followed by a day of feasting and rest.

A sacred feast was part of the initiation ritual. Firmicus Maternus, a Christian who objected to other religions, revealed a possible password of the galli: "I have eaten from the timbrel; I have drunk from the cymbal; I am become an initiate of Attis." That password is cited in the book De errore profanarum religionum. However, the password is written in Greek with a translation into Latin, which does not contain any reference to Attis. Some editions of the text also omit "Attis" in the Greek password. The Eleusinian Mysteries, reported by Clement of Alexandria, include a similar formula: "I fasted; I drank the kykeon [water with meal]; I took from the sacred chest; I wrought therewith and put it in the basket, and from the basket into the chest." Clement also reported (as paraphrased by a 20th-century historian) "carrying a vessel called a kernos" and entering "the pastos or marriage-chamber".

The signs of their office have been described as a type of crown, possibly a laurel wreath, as well as a golden bracelet known as the occabus. They generally wore women's clothing (often yellow), and a turban, pendants, and earrings. They bleached their hair and wore it long, and they wore heavy makeup. They wandered around with followers, begging for charity, in return for which they were prepared to tell fortunes.

In Rome, the head of the galli was known as the archigallus, at least from the period of Claudius on. A number of archaeological finds depict the archigallus wearing luxurious and extravagant costumes. The archigallus was always a Roman citizen chosen by the quindecimviri sacris faciundis, whose term of service lasted for life. Along with the institution of the archigallus came the Phrygianum sanctuary as well as the rite of the taurobolium as it pertains to the Magna Mater, two aspects of the Magna Mater's cultus that the archigallus held dominion over.

== Interpretations ==
Shelley Hales wrote: "Greek and Roman literature consistently reinforces the sexual and racial difference of eunuchs by stressing how different they look. They were presented as wearing bright clothes, heavy jewellery, make-up and sporting bleached and crimped hair." Because the galli castrated themselves and wore women's clothing, accessories and makeup, some scholars have interpreted them as transgender.

The galli may also have occupied a "third gender" in Roman society. Jacob Latham has connected the foreign nature of Magna Mater and her priests' nonconforming gender presentation. They may have existed outside Roman constructions of masculinity and femininity altogether, which can explain the adverse reactions of Roman male citizens against the galli's transgression of gender norms. Firmicus Maternus said "they say they are not men... they want to pass as women." He elaborated, "Animated by some sort of reverential feeling, they actually have made this element [air] into a woman [Caelestis, the goddess]. For, because air is an intermediary between sea and sky, they honor it through priests who have womanish voices."

Some scholars have linked the episode of the self-castration of Attis to the ritual castration of the galli. At Pessinus, the centre of the Cybele cult, there were two high priests during the Hellenistic period, one with the title of "Attis" and the other with the name of "Battakes". Both were eunuchs. The high priests had considerable political influence during this period, and letters exist from a high priest of Attis to the kings of Pergamon, Eumenes II and Attalus II, inscribed on stone. Later, during the Flavian period, there was a college of ten priests, not castrated, and now Roman citizens, but still using the title "Attis".

== See also ==
- Sacerdos Matris Deum Magnae Idaeae
- Elagabalus (deity)
- Gala (priests) of Inanna
- Enaree
- Hijra
- Korybantes
- Priesthood of Atargatis
- Skoptsy
- Taurobolium
- Catullus 63
- Genital modification and mutilation

== Sources ==
- John Bell (1790). Bell's New Pantheon; or Historical Dictionary of the Gods, Demi-gods, Heroes and Fabulous Personages of Antiquity. London: Printed by and for J. Bell at the British Library, Strand. pp. 26, 82, 90, 322–323. "Galli."
