= Atys =

Atys may refer to:

- Atys (King of Alba Longa), a king of Alba Longa in Roman mythology
- Atys of Lydia, an early king of Lydia, then probably known as Maeonia, and was the father of Lydus
- Atys (son of Croesus), the son of the later King Croesus of Lydia
- Tantalus (son of Broteas), husband of Clytemnestra in Greek mythology
- Atys (Lully), a 1676 tragédie lyrique by Jean-Baptiste Lully
- Atys, a poorly-studied Lydian solar deity, wrongly conflated with Attis in 19th century scholarship (see discussion in Attis)
- Atys (gastropod), a genus of gastropods in the family Haminoeidae
- Atys (Piccinni), a 1780 tragédie lyrique in three acts by Niccolò Piccinni
- Atys, a fictional planet that is the setting of the massively multiplayer online role-playing game Ryzom

== See also ==
- Atis (disambiguation)
- Attis, a Phrygian / Roman deity with a similar-sounding name, frequently but mistakenly equated with Atys (deity), due to a long-accepted 19th century scholarly error (see discussion in Attis)
