= Hatis =

Village in Kotayk, Armenia

Hatis Հատիս
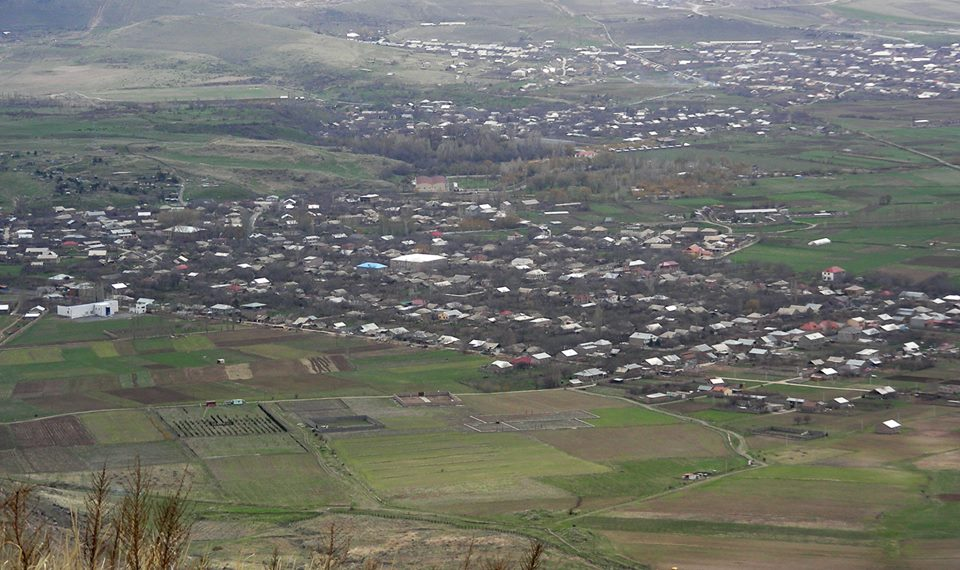
- Hatis Village, Kotayk Province

- Location within Armenia
- Coordinates: 40°20′26″N 44°43′47″E
- Country: Armenia
- Marz (Province): Kotayk

Population (2011)
  - Total: 302
- Time zone: UTC+4 ( )

Hatis (Armenian: Հատիս), formerly known as Kyankyan, is a village in the Kotayk Province of Armenia. The village is populated by mostly Armenians with Kurds being a minority (about 8%).

== See also ==
- Kotayk Province
