= Attis =

Phrygian and Greek god

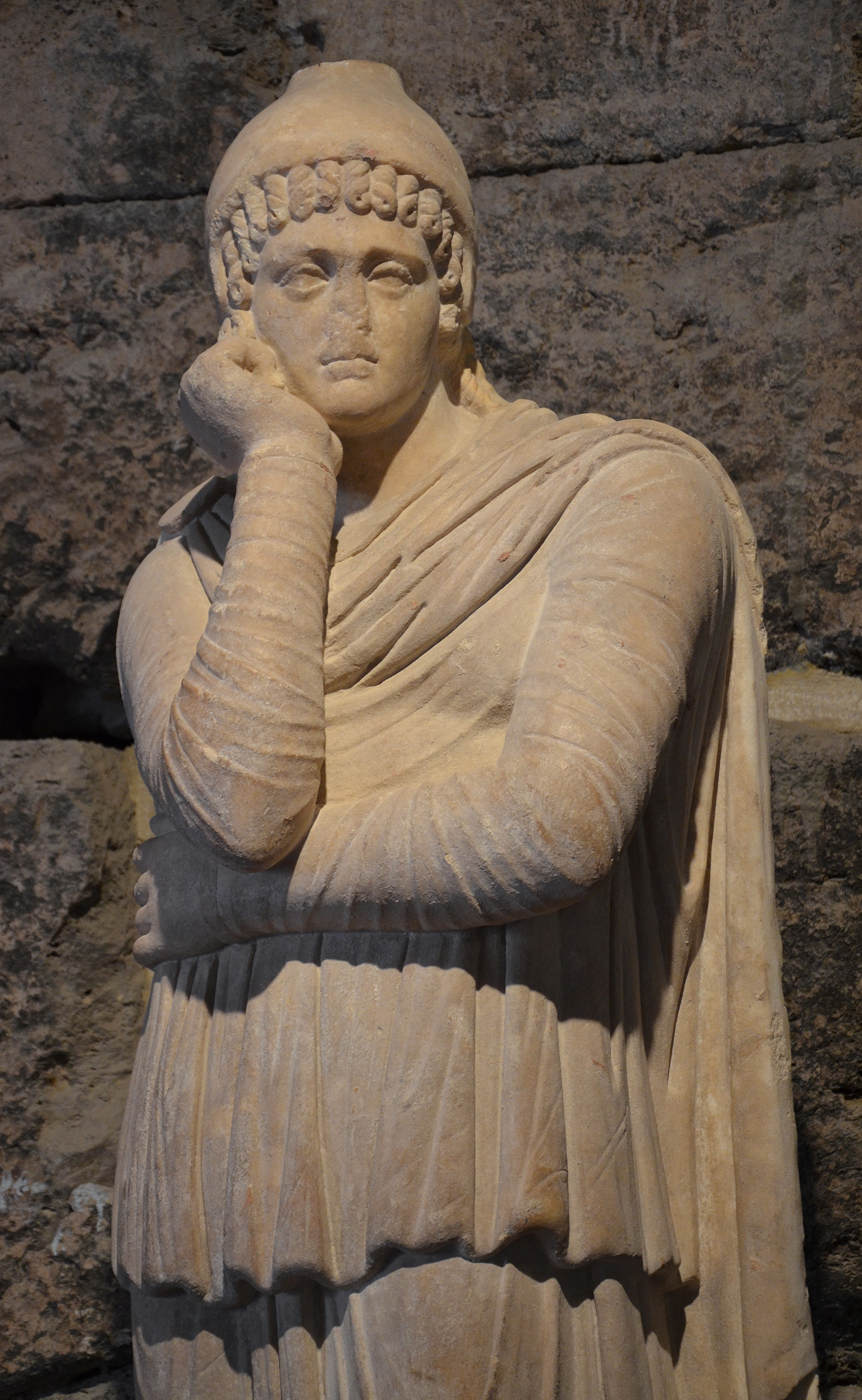
- Statue of Attis from Roman Hierapolis

Genealogy
- Died: Self-castration
- Parents: Nana (mother)
- Consort: Cybele

Attis (/ˈætɪs/; Ancient Greek: Ἄττις, also Ἄτυς, Ἄττυς, Ἄττης) was the consort of Cybele, in Phrygian and Greek mythology. (Note: A connection to the Lydian god Atys supposed by late 19th century scholars, based on a description of man named Atys by Herodotus was a mistake. The error is still repeated by most modern sources (with the notable exception of W. Burkert), even though it was explained and debunked by Bremmer (2004).)

His priests were eunuchs, the Galli, as explained by origin myths pertaining to Attis castrating himself. Attis was also a Phrygian vegetation deity. His self-mutilation, death, and resurrection represents the fruits of the earth, which die in winter only to rise again in the spring.

According to Ovid's Metamorphoses, Attis transformed himself into a pine tree.

== History ==
An Attis cult began around 1250 BCE in Dindymon (today's Murat Dağı of Gediz, Kütahya, Turkey). He was originally a local semi-deity of Phrygia, associated with the great Phrygian trading city of Pessinos, which lay under the lee of Mount Agdistis. The mountain was personified as a daemon, whom foreigners associated with the Great Mother Cybele.

In the late 4th century BCE, a cult of Attis became a feature of the Greek world. The story of his origins as Agdistis, as recorded by the traveller Pausanias, have some distinctly non-Greek elements.

Pausanias was told that the daemon Agdistis initially bore both male and female sexual organs. The Olympian gods feared Agdistis and conspired to cause Agdistis to accidentally castrate itself, ridding itself of its male organs. From the hemorrhage of Agdistis germinated an almond tree. When the fruits ripened, Nana, daughter of the river Sangarius, took an almond, put it in her bosom, and later became pregnant with baby Attis, whom she abandoned.

The infant was tended by a he-goat. As Attis grew, his long-haired beauty was godlike, and Agdistis (as Cybele) then fell in love with him. But Attis' foster parents sent him to Pessinos to wed the king's daughter. According to some versions the king of Pessinos was Midas.

Just as the marriage-song was being sung, Agdistis/Cybele appeared in her transcendent power, and Attis went mad and castrated himself under a pine. When he died as a result of his self-inflicted wounds, violets grew from his blood. The king followed suit, prefiguring the self-castrating corybantes who devoted themselves to Cybele. The heartbroken Agdistis begged Zeus, the Father God, to preserve Attis so his body would never decay or decompose.

The geographer Strabo recounted in his Geographica that the mother of the gods at the temple of Cybele in Pessinus was still referred to as Agdistis; Strabo wrote the Geographica in either the late first century BCE or the early first century CE.

As neighbouring Lydia came to control Phrygia, the cult of Attis was given an additional Lydian context. Attis is said to have introduced to Lydia the cult of the Mother Goddess Cybele, incurring the jealousy of Zeus, who sent a wild boar to destroy the Lydian crops. Then certain Lydians, with Attis himself, were killed by the boar. Pausanias adds, to corroborate this story, that the Gauls who inhabited Pessinos abstained from eating pork. This myth element may have been invented solely to explain the unusual dietary laws of the Lydian Gauls. In Rome, the eunuch followers of Cybele were called galli.

Julian describes the orgiastic cult of Cybele and its spread. It began in Anatolia and was adopted in Greece, and eventually Republican Rome; the cult of Attis, her reborn eunuch consort, accompanied her.

== Religious worship ==
=== Priests ===
The temple of Cybele at Pessinus was the center of the cult of Cybele and Attis, and remained relevant during the Roman Empire. The Galli (priests of Cybele and Attis) held a theocracy here, with leaders perhaps creating succession by adoption. The highest ranking Gallus was known as "Attis", and his junior as "Battakes". At this time, the Galli were eunuchs, and some modern scholars have compared the mythology of the self-castration of Attis to the ritual castration of the Galli. Later, during the Flavian period, these followers took the form of a college of ten priests, who were Roman citizens and not castrated. However, they still used the title "Attis".

Modern scholars have examined how the Galli subverted Roman gender norms. Because the Galli castrated themselves and wore women's clothing, accessories and makeup, some modern scholars have interpreted them as transgender. Another interpretation is that the Galli may have occupied a third gender in Roman society. Jacob Latham has examined how the foreignness of the cult and the priests' nonconforming gender presentation may have existed outside Roman constructions of masculinity and femininity altogether. Roman writers, often male citizens of Rome, who described the Galli often derided their gender presentation, and the priests' transgressions of Roman norms can explain this hostility.

=== Festivals ===
The Romans, beginning with the Principate, celebrated Attis and Cybele with a March festival week called the Hilaria. Citizens and freedmen who were members of specific priestly colleges could participate in rites for Attis in constrained ways. The Cannophores ("reed bearers") and the Dendrophores ("tree bearers") each had ritual roles during the first days.

On the 24th of March, the Dies Sanguinis (Day of Blood), followers mourned Attis's death by flogging themselves until they bled on his altar. The Galli also performed their initiation ritual, which involved ritual castration. By night, Attis was ritually entombed. The next day, the Day of Joy (Hilaria), featured Attis' rebirth. It was also the vernal equinox on the Roman calendar. Some early Christian sources associate this day with the resurrection of Jesus.

== Literature ==
The first literary reference to Attis is the subject of one of the most famous poems by Catullus (Catullus 63), apparently before Attis had begun to be worshipped in Rome, as Attis' worship began in the early Empire.

In 1675, Jean-Baptiste Lully, who was attached to Louis XIV's court, composed an opera titled Atys. In 1780, Niccolo Piccinni composed his own Atys.

Oscar Wilde mentions Attis' self-mutilation in his poem The Sphinx, published in 1894:

"And Atys with his blood-stained knife
were better than the thing I am."

== Philosophy ==
Emperor Julian's "Hymn to the Mother of Gods" contains a detailed Neoplatonic analysis of Attis. In that work Julian says: "Of him [Attis] the myth relates that, after being exposed at birth near the eddying stream of the river Gallus, he grew up like a flower, and when he had grown to be fair and tall, he was beloved by the Mother of the Gods. And she entrusted all things to him, and moreover set on his head the starry cap." On this passage, the scholiast (Wright) says: "The whole passage implies the identification of Attis with nature...cf. 162A where Attis is called 'Nature,' φύσις."

== Archaeological finds ==
The most important representation of Attis is the lifesize statue discovered at Ostia Antica, near the mouth of Rome's river. The statue is of a reclining Attis, after the emasculation. In his left hand is a shepherd's crook, in his right hand a pomegranate. His head is crowned with a pine garland with fruits, bronze rays of the sun, and on his Phrygian cap is a crescent moon. It was discovered in 1867 at the Campus of the Magna Mater together with other statues. The objects seem to have been hidden there in late antiquity. A plaster cast of it sits in the apse of the Sanctuary of Attis at the Campus of the Magna Mater, while the original was moved to the Vatican Museums.

A marble bas-relief depicting Cybele in her chariot and Attis, from Magna Graecia, is in the archaeological museum in Venice. The pair also feature prominently on the silver Parabiago plate.

A finely executed silvery brass Attis that had been ritually consigned to the Moselle River was recovered during construction in 1963 and is kept at the Rheinisches Landesmuseum of Trier. It shows the typically Anatolian costume of the god: trousers fastened together down the front of the legs with toggles and the Phrygian cap. (Note: Images may be found at wikimedia, and at Summa Gallicana.)

In 2007, in the ruins of Herculaneum a wooden throne was discovered adorned with a relief of Attis beneath a sacred pine tree, gathering cones. Various finds suggest that the cult of Attis was popular in Herculaneum at the time of the eruption of Vesuvius in 79 CE.

== Conflation with the god Atys ==
Nineteenth century scholarship wrongly identified the god Attis with the similar-sounding name of the god Atys. The name "Atys" is often seen in ancient Aegean cultures; it was mentioned by Herodotus, however Herodotus was describing Atys, the son of Croesus, a human in a historical account. The 19th-century conflation of the man Atys's name with the mythology of the god he was presumably named after, "Atys the sun god, slain by the boar's tusk of winter", and hence a connection to similar-sounding Attis was a mistake, but the long-standing error is still found in modern sources. (Note: The often-repeated Atys / Attis connection was a mistake; it is disentangled and debunked by Bremmer (2004).)

== Photo gallery ==
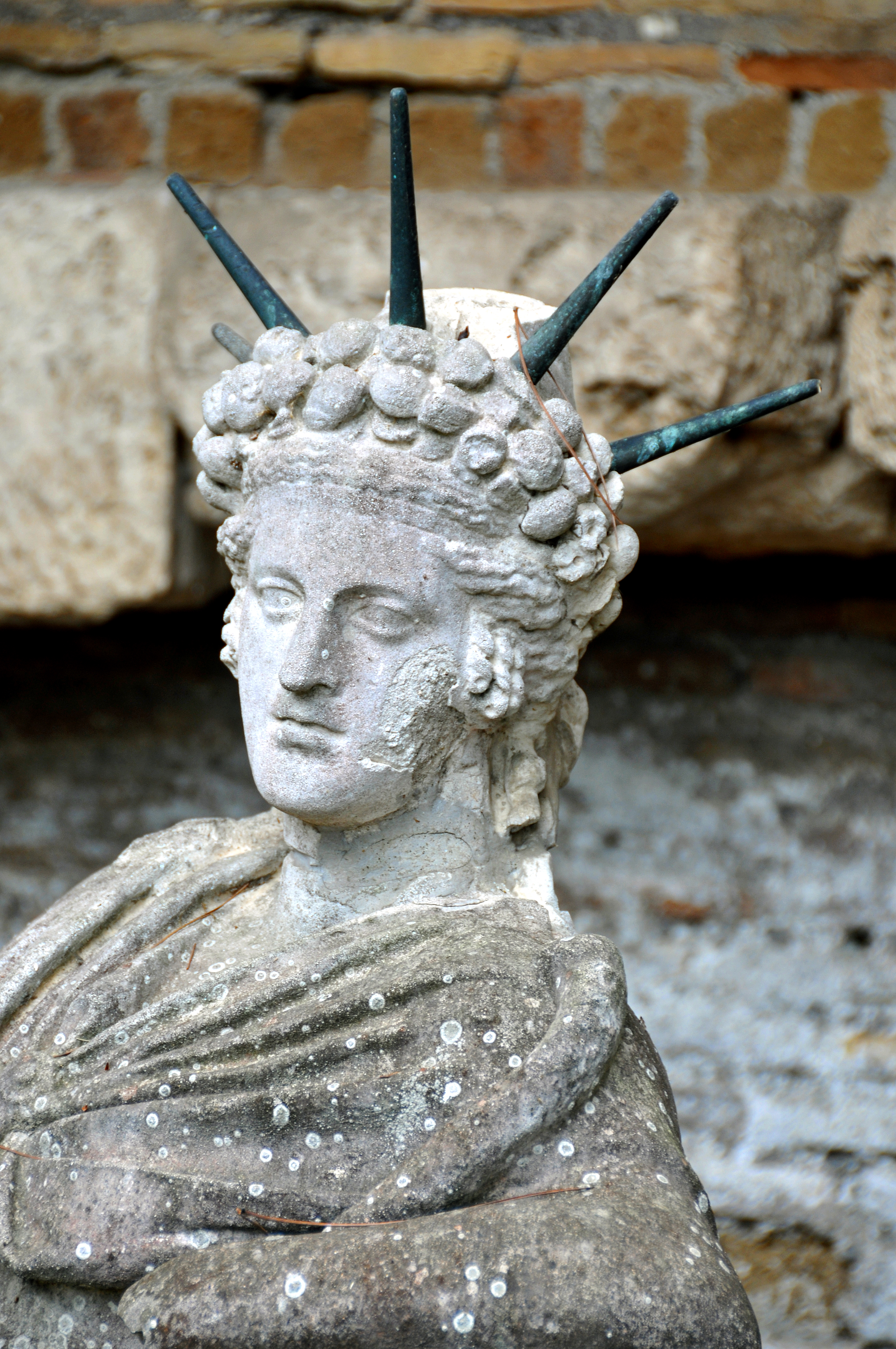
Plaster cast of the Attis statue at the Shrine of Attis situated in the Campus of the Magna Mater in Ostia Antica, Italy.

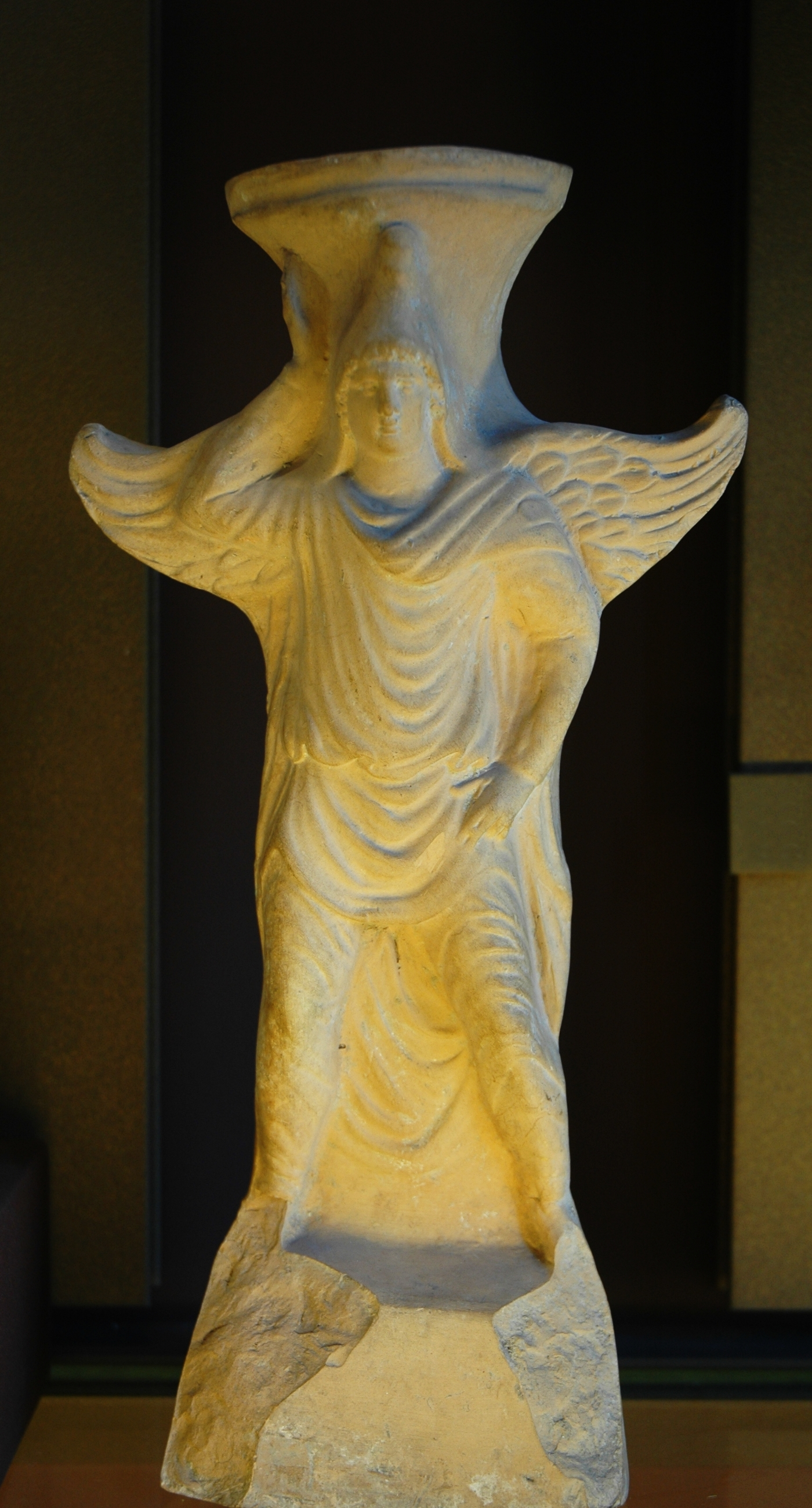
Attis wearing the Phrygian cap. Terracotta thymiaterion at the Louvre from Tarsus

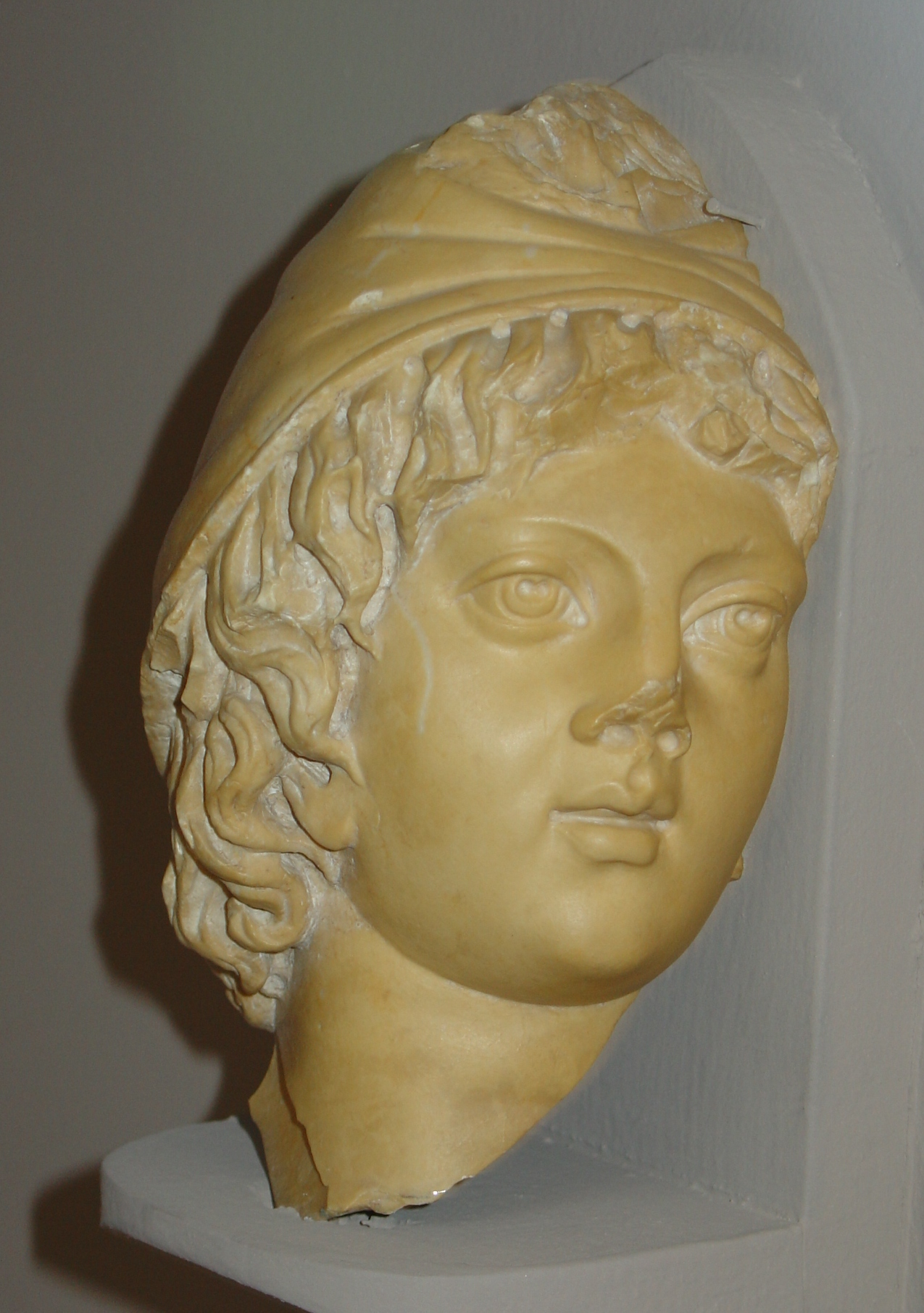
Sculpture of Attis. Ephesus Archaeological Museum, Efes, Turkey.

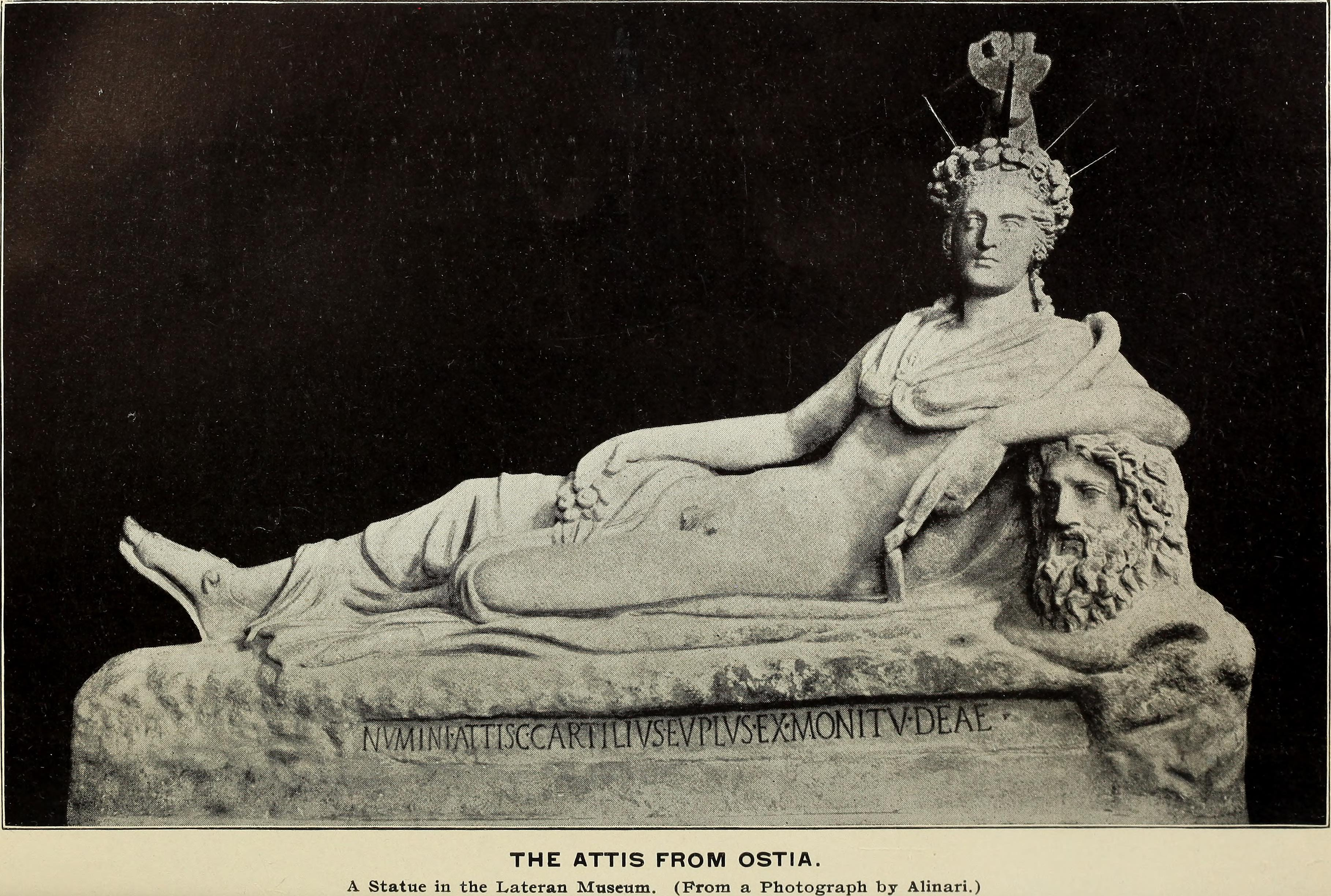
Ancient Roman statue of god Attis found at Ostia (Rome), now in the Lateran Museum.

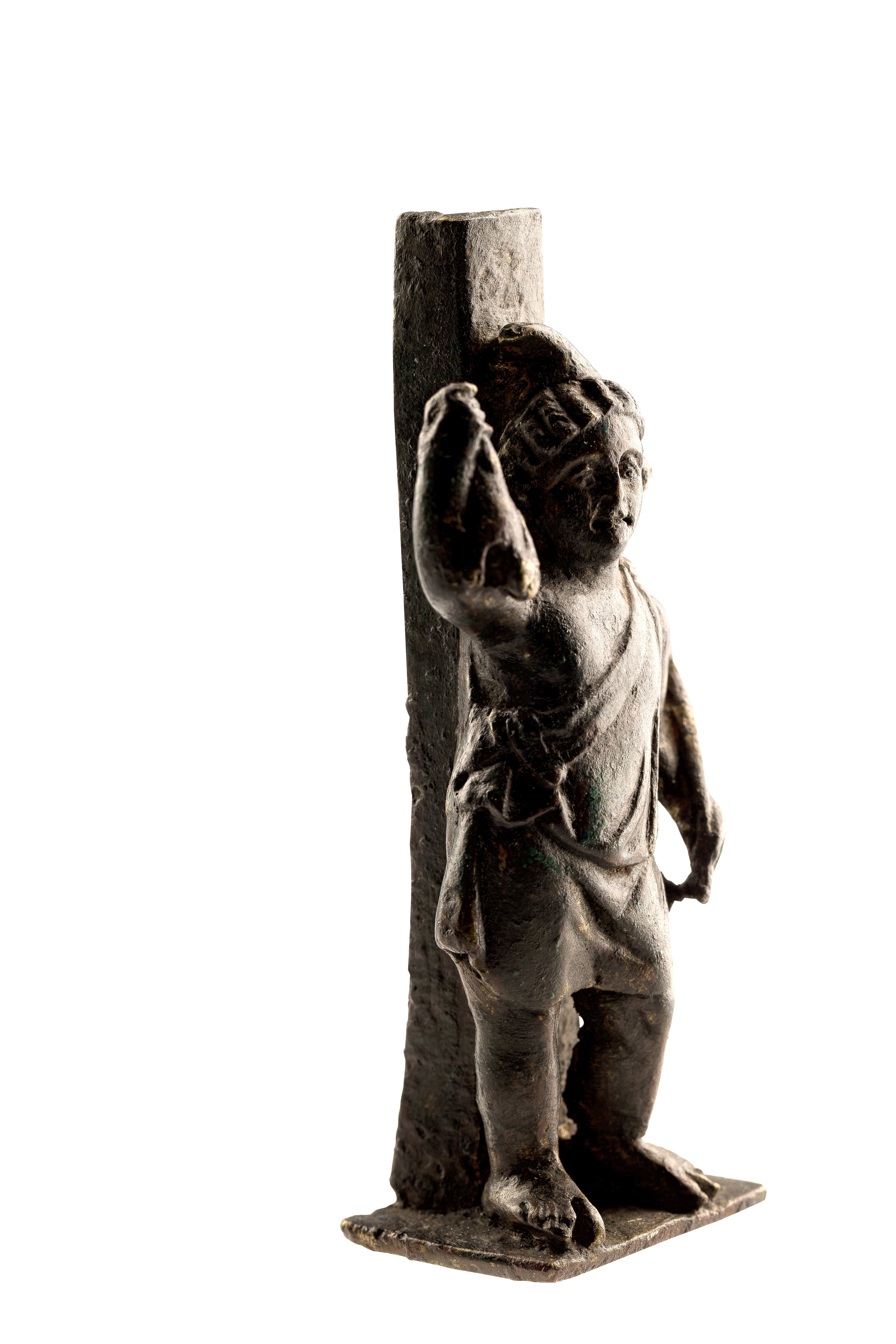
Bronze figurine of Attis, with typical attributes: Hare and shepherd's staff, 75-150 CE, found in Tongeren, Belgium, Gallo-Roman Museum (Tongeren)
