= Temple of Victory =

Archaeological site in Italy

- Shown in ancient Rome
- Interactive map of Temple of Victory
- 41°53′22″N 12°29′06″E

The Temple of Victory (Latin: aedes Victoriae) is a temple on the Palatine Hill in Rome. It was dedicated to the Roman goddess of Victory.

It is traditionally ascribed to Evander, but was built by Lucius Postumius Megellus out of fines he levied during his aedileship and dedicated by him on 1 August when consul in 294 BC. This temple was used to house Cybele's sacred stone between 204 BC and 191 BC, while her nearby temple was still being built and Cato the Elder afterwards built a shrine of Victoria Virgo next to the temple of Victory. If still in use by the 4th century, it would have been closed during the persecution of pagans in the late Roman Empire.

It was in the Temple of Victory that the spoils of war from Roman victories were eventually deposited. Some of its notable contents came from the spoils of Titus from the Temple of Jerusalem, which remained deposited in the Temple of Victory until it was looted by the Vandals in the 5th century and subsequently taken to Africa. The golden roof of the temple was also removed by the barbarians during their pillage of Rome.

There is no record of any restoration of this temple and its exact site is still uncertain. See CJ 1920, 297, where Chase states that Boni identified this temple with foundations found near the arch of Titus. It was doubtless on the Clivus Victoriae, and remains of two dedicatory inscriptions. found about 50 metres west of the present church of San Teodoro, may indicate its position.

== See also ==
- List of Ancient Roman temples
