= Illyrian fibulae =

Ancient brooch jewellery

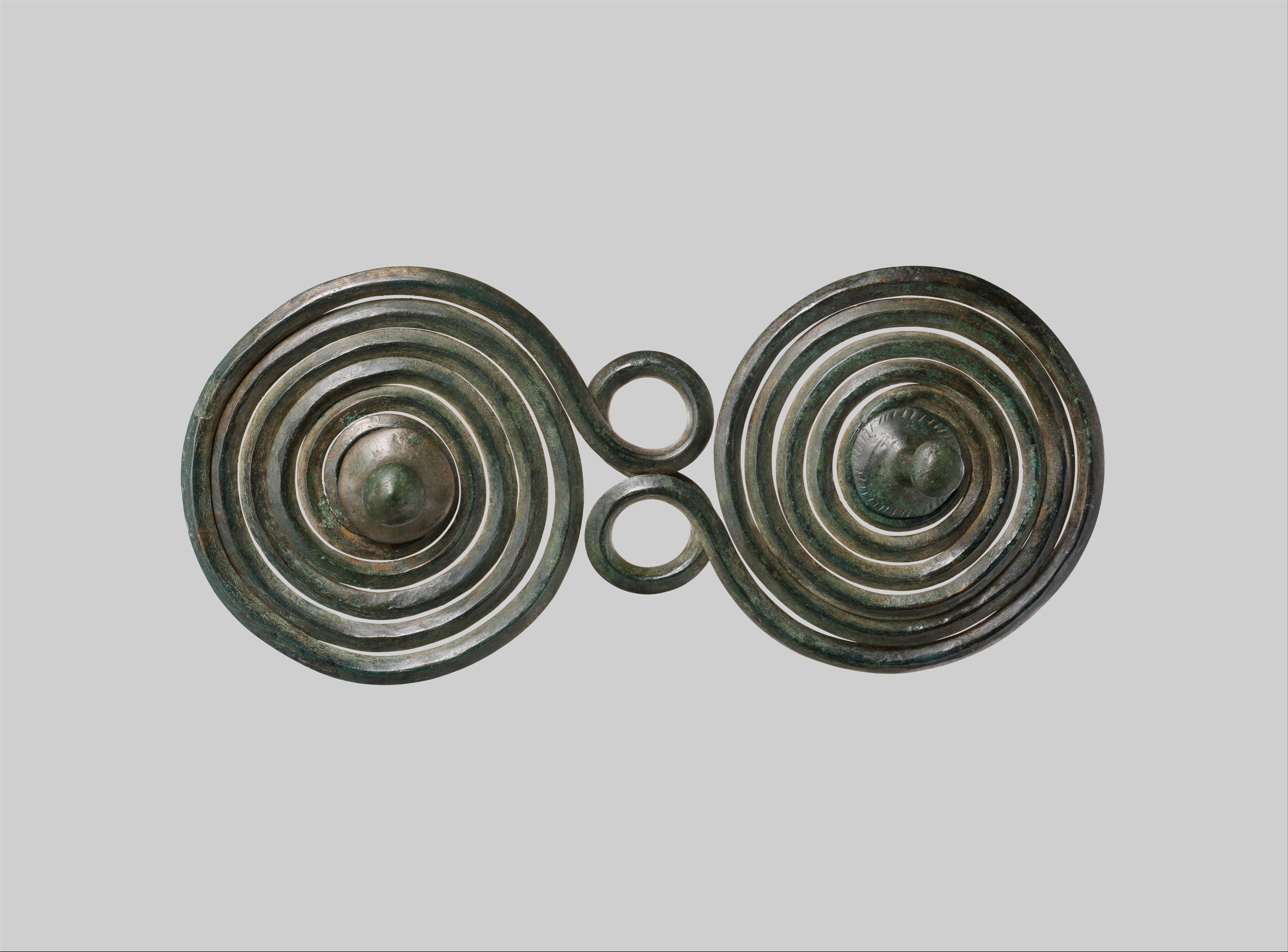
Large Brooch with Spirals, European Bronze Age, 1400–1100 B.C.

Illyrian fibulae or brooches were widely used by Illyrians and were very common in Illyria. Some types of fibulae are one of the few objects that all of the Illyrians used and some are even used to declare the distribution of Illyrian people. Illyrians loved ornaments, and on festive occasions their womenfolk would appear heavily draped with all manner of jewellery. Several varieties of fibulae have a distinctive evolution in Ilyria, notable the Spectacle brooch of two concentrically wound spirals attached to the pin. The Glasinac fibula was a variant of the simple bow-fibula which is common among many Illyrians. Other forms which appear in the early Iron Age include those and with bosses on the arch, animal-shaped brooches, serpent-shaped and plate-brooches, the last being distinctively Liburnian.

A significant later import was the heavy brooch with a large arch and long arm named from the site of Certosa near Bologna. Another distinctive brooch, often made in silver and with a wide arch in the form of open petals, is named from the fine examples found at Strpci on the Drina river near Gorazde. This type seems to have been popular among the southern Illyrians and is believed to be modeled on Greek forms.

== See also ==
- Illyrians
