= Spectacle brooch =

Buckle for clothing

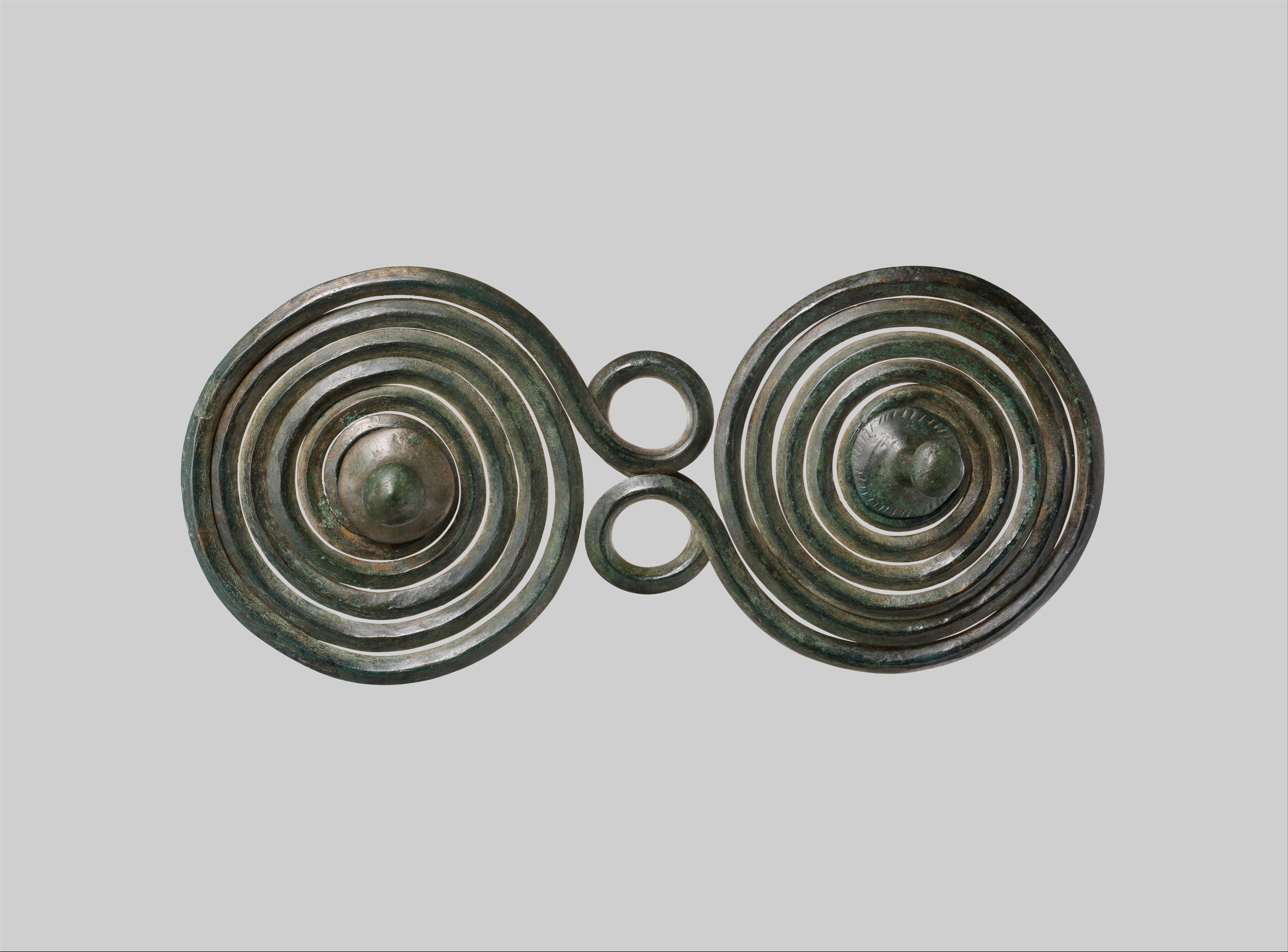
Large Brooch with Spirals, European Bronze Age, 1400–1100 B.C.

The spectacle brooch was an ancient fibula from the late European Bronze Age and early Iron Age, primarily worn by adult women of higher social rank. One form of the spectacle brooch originates from the Illyrians and consists of two concentrically wound spirals attached to a pin.
